= National Register of Historic Places listings in Hardin County, Kentucky =

Location of Hardin County in Kentucky

This is a list of the National Register of Historic Places listings in Hardin County, Kentucky.

This is intended to be a complete list of the properties and districts on the National Register of Historic Places in Hardin County, Kentucky, United States. The locations of National Register properties and districts for which the latitude and longitude coordinates are included below, may be seen in a map.

There are 90 properties and districts listed on the National Register in the county. Another property was once listed but has been removed.

This National Park Service list is complete through NPS recent listings posted October 30, 2026.

== Current listings ==
	Name on the Register	Image	Date listed	Location	City or town	Description
1	Dr. Abel House		October 4, 1988 (#88001768)	Kentucky Route 1904 1 mile west of Kentucky Route 222; 37°36′38″N 85°57′42″W	Glendale	
2	Applegate-Fisher House		October 4, 1988 (#88001787)	404 Elm St. 37°59′58″N 85°56′50″W	West Point	
3	Philip Arnold House		October 4, 1988 (#88001798)	422 E. Poplar St. 37°41′31″N 85°50′51″W	Elizabethtown	
4	Ashe House		October 4, 1988 (#88001755)	Kentucky Route 1868, 1 mile west of its junction with Kentucky Route 1136; 37°36′05″N 85°54′20″W	Glendale	
5	Bethlehem Academy Historic District		October 4, 1988 (#88001813)	Near the junction of Kentucky Routes 253 and 1357; 37°42′03″N 85°59′46″W	St. John	
6	John D. Bland House		October 4, 1988 (#88001729)	Kentucky Route 720, 2 miles west of its junction with Kentucky Route 84; 37°30′40″N 85°54′51″W	Sonora	
7	William Bland House		October 4, 1988 (#88001734)	Kentucky Route 222, 2.5 miles west of Glendale; 37°36′50″N 85°58′15″W	Glendale	
8	Bland-Overall House		October 4, 1988 (#88001728)	Kentucky Route 1868, 0.8 miles west of its junction with Kentucky Route 1136; 37°34′53″N 85°55′47″W	Sonora	
9	Blue Ball Church		October 4, 1988 (#88001727)	Blue Ball Church Rd., 0.6 miles south of its junction with Kentucky Routes 220 and 1375; 37°43′32″N 86°02′14″W	Howe Valley	
10	J. Roy Bond House	J. Roy Bond House	October 4, 1988 (#88001811)	317 College St. 37°41′36″N 85°52′00″W	Elizabethtown	
11	Daniel Brackett House		October 4, 1988 (#88001752)	Kentucky Route 1931, 0.5 miles south of Kentucky Route 224; 37°26′53″N 85°57′31″W	Upton	
12	Brown Pusey House Community Center	Brown Pusey House Community Center	July 12, 1974 (#74000878)	128 N. Maine St. 37°41′39″N 85°51′26″W	Elizabethtown	
13	William Bush House	William Bush House	October 4, 1988 (#88001807)	1927 Tunnel Hill Rd. 37°43′43″N 85°50′05″W	Elizabethtown	
14	Dr. Clyde Carroll House		October 4, 1988 (#88001764)	Dead Man's Cave Rd. 37°33′31″N 86°01′46″W	White Mills	
15	Chenault House		October 4, 1988 (#88001781)	Kentucky Route 1375, 1.5 miles north of Kentucky Route 84; 37°34′26″N 85°58′21″W	Star Mills	
16	Chestnut Grove		October 4, 1988 (#88001731)	Kentucky Route 222, 1 mile west of Glendale; 37°37′00″N 85°55′02″W	Glendale	
17	Christ Episcopal Church	Christ Episcopal Church	October 4, 1988 (#88001792)	Poplar St. 37°41′42″N 85°51′32″W	Elizabethtown	
18	Abraham Ditto House		October 4, 1988 (#88001789)	204 Elm St. 37°59′59″N 85°56′44″W	West Point	
19	Ditto-Prewitt House		October 4, 1988 (#88001786)	306 Elm St. 37°59′58″N 85°56′47″W	West Point	
20	Elizabethtown Armory	Elizabethtown Armory	September 6, 2002 (#02000921)	205 Warfield St. 37°41′57″N 85°51′22″W	Elizabethtown	
21	Elizabethtown City Cemetery	Elizabethtown City Cemetery	August 18, 1997 (#97000872)	E. Dixie Ave., junction of E. Dixie Ave. and Crestwood St. 37°41′20″N 85°51′16″W	Elizabethtown	
22	Elizabethtown Courthouse Square and Commercial District	Elizabethtown Courthouse Square and Commercial District	March 19, 1980 (#80001535)	Kentucky Route 61; 37°41′35″N 85°51′29″W	Elizabethtown	
23	Embry Chapel Church	Embry Chapel Church	October 4, 1988 (#88001803)	117 Mulberry St. 37°41′40″N 85°51′38″W	Elizabethtown	
24	First Baptist Church	First Baptist Church	December 31, 1974 (#74000879)	112 W. Poplar St. 37°41′40″N 85°51′29″W	Elizabethtown	
25	First Presbyterian Church	First Presbyterian Church	October 4, 1988 (#88001802)	212 W. Dixie Ave. 37°41′39″N 85°51′38″W	Elizabethtown	
26	Fort Duffield	Fort Duffield	January 31, 1994 (#93001584)	East of U.S. Route 31W off West Point Marina Rd. 37°59′35″N 85°56′31″W	West Point	
27	Fort Sands		November 25, 1994 (#94001379)	Off Interstate 65 southwest of Lebanon Junction, above the CSX railroad trestle over Sulfur Fork; 37°45′28″N 85°48′28″W	Lebanon Junction	
28	Glendale Historic District		October 4, 1988 (#88001816)	Main St. between County Highway 1136 and Railroad Ave. 37°36′08″N 85°54′25″W	Glendale	
29	Hagan House		October 4, 1988 (#88001760)	Kentucky Route 1136 2.5 miles west of its junction with U.S. Route 31W; 37°38′51″N 85°52′43″W	Elizabethtown	
30	Hance Hamilton House		October 4, 1988 (#88001741)	Porter Rd., 1 mile east of its junction with U.S. Route 62; 37°45′15″N 85°42′22″W	Boston	
31	Hardin Springs School		October 4, 1988 (#88001783)	Kentucky Route 84, 0.4 miles east of Hardin Springs Bridge; 37°36′27″N 86°15′04″W	Hardin Springs	
32	Fannie Harrison Farm		February 7, 2008 (#08000005)	132 Arnold Ln. 37°39′37″N 85°53′34″W	Elizabethtown	
33	Hatfield Hotel		October 4, 1988 (#88001763)	Dead Man's Cave Rd. 37°33′18″N 86°01′50″W	White Mills	
34	Haycraft Inn		October 4, 1988 (#88001742)	2315 S. Wilson Rd. 37°48′36″N 85°55′28″W	Radcliffe	
35	Hazel Hill		October 5, 1988 (#88001744)	Gaither's Station Rd., 2 miles south of U.S. Route 62; 37°39′28″N 85°54′40″W	Elizabethtown	Demolished in 2025
36	Heller Hotel		October 4, 1988 (#88001756)	Robinson St. 37°39′55″N 85°56′01″W	Cecilia	
37	Helm Place	Helm Place	November 9, 1976 (#76000895)	1.5 miles north of Elizabethtown on U.S. Route 31W; 37°42′38″N 85°52′25″W	Elizabethtown	
38	Benjamin Helm House	Benjamin Helm House	October 4, 1988 (#88001801)	238 Helm Ave. 37°41′38″N 85°51′48″W	Elizabethtown	
39	John B. Helm House	John B. Helm House	October 4, 1988 (#88001800)	210 Helm Ave. 37°41′35″N 85°51′41″W	Elizabethtown	
40	Jonathan Hills House	Jonathan Hills House	December 23, 2009 (#09001139)	202 N. Main St. 37°41′40″N 85°51′26″W	Elizabethtown	
41	Kentucky and Indiana Bank		October 4, 1988 (#88001788)	309 Elm St. 37°59′56″N 85°56′47″W	West Point	
42	W.T. Kerrick House	W.T. Kerrick House	October 4, 1988 (#88001808)	604 N. Main St. 37°41′57″N 85°51′05″W	Elizabethtown	
43	Larue-Layman House	Larue-Layman House	October 4, 1988 (#88001794)	115 W. Poplar St. 37°41′43″N 85°51′29″W	Elizabethtown	
44	Lincoln Heritage House	Lincoln Heritage House	March 26, 1973 (#73000805)	North of Elizabethtown on Freeman Lake; 37°43′08″N 85°52′22″W	Elizabethtown	
45	Louisville-Nashville Turnpike Segment		July 31, 1996 (#96000790)	Northern boundary of Fort Knox at the foot of Muldraugh Hill and continuing south for 3 miles 37°57′22″N 85°57′23″W	Fort Knox	
46	Maple Hill		October 4, 1988 (#88001735)	Maple St. 37°36′48″N 85°54′31″W	Glendale	
47	Maplehurst		October 4, 1988 (#88001732)	Kentucky Route 222, 1 mile northeast of Glendale; 37°37′21″N 85°54′35″W	Glendale	
48	Haynes Mason House		October 4, 1988 (#88001782)	Haynes Mason Rd., 0.3 miles south of Kentucky Route 720; 37°29′43″N 85°55′49″W	Upton	
49	David L. May House	David L. May House	October 5, 1988 (#88001805)	201 N. Main St. 37°41′39″N 85°51′24″W	Elizabethtown	
50	Stiles McDougal House		October 4, 1988 (#88001740)	0.3 miles south of the junction of U.S. Route 62 and Kentucky Route 1375; 37°37′23″N 85°58′43″W	Glendale	
51	McKinney-Helm House	McKinney-Helm House	October 5, 1988 (#88001795)	218 W. Poplar St. 37°41′44″N 85°51′36″W	Elizabethtown	
52	Melton House		October 5, 1988 (#88001769)	Kentucky Route 1904 2 miles east of Kentucky Route 1375; 37°35′58″N 85°57′11″W	Glendale	
53	Adam Monin House		October 5, 1988 (#88001745)	Monin Rd., off Route 1; 37°41′43″N 85°51′33″W	Glendale	
54	Montgomery Avenue Historic District	Montgomery Avenue Historic District	October 5, 1988 (#88001814)	602, 606, 608, 610, 614, 616, and 624 Montgomery Ave. 37°41′55″N 85°50′56″W	Elizabethtown	
55	William Montgomery House	William Montgomery House	October 5, 1988 (#88001806)	414 Central Ave. 37°41′49″N 85°51′09″W	Elizabethtown	
56	Morrison Lodge	Morrison Lodge	October 5, 1988 (#88001804)	121 N. Mulberry St. 37°41′41″N 85°51′30″W	Elizabethtown	
57	Nall House		October 5, 1988 (#88001784)	Middle Creek Rd., 0.2 miles west of Locust Grove Rd. 37°39′59″N 85°47′24″W	Elizabethtown	
58	Nolin Banking Company		October 5, 1988 (#88001749)	Kentucky Route 1407; 37°33′38″N 85°54′11″W	Nolin	
59	Penniston House		October 5, 1988 (#88001785)	U.S. Route 62, 0.4 miles east of Upper Colesburg Rd. 37°41′35″N 85°51′51″W	Elizabethtown	
60	Josiah Phillips House		October 5, 1988 (#88001747)	Western Ave. 37°31′26″N 85°53′42″W	Sonora	
61	Dr. Robert B. Pusey House	Dr. Robert B. Pusey House	January 4, 1989 (#88001793)	204 N. Mulberry St. 37°41′44″N 85°51′30″W	Elizabethtown	
62	John Raine House		October 5, 1988 (#88001748)	Kentucky Route 84; 37°31′27″N 85°53′24″W	Sonora	
63	Stephen Rawlings House	Stephen Rawlings House	October 5, 1988 (#88001791)	811 N. Main St. 37°42′07″N 85°50′45″W	Elizabethtown	
64	Richards-Hamm House		October 5, 1988 (#88001766)	Kentucky Route 1136 0.4 miles west of U.S. Route 31W; 37°34′27″N 85°52′32″W	Glendale	
65	Richards-Murray House		October 5, 1988 (#88001767)	Junction of U.S. Route 31W and Kentucky Route 1136; 37°34′22″N 85°52′10″W	Glendale	
66	Richardson Hotel		October 5, 1988 (#88001762)	Dead Man's Cave Rd. 37°33′17″N 86°01′52″W	White Mills	
67	Zachariah Riney House		October 5, 1988 (#88001758)	Junction of Kentucky Routes 220 and 1600; 37°44′58″N 85°58′10″W	Rineyville	
68	Samuel Robertson House	Samuel Robertson House	October 5, 1988 (#88001812)	214 W. Poplar St. 37°41′44″N 85°51′34″W	Elizabethtown	
69	Richard Skees House		October 5, 1988 (#88001780)	Jerome Peerce Rd., off Kentucky Route 1823; 37°34′27″N 85°58′57″W	White Mills	
70	William Skees House		October 5, 1988 (#88001757)	Off Kentucky Route 1866 2 miles north of its junction with Kentucky Route 720; 37°30′39″N 86°03′30″W	White Mills	
71	George W. Smith House		October 5, 1988 (#88001738)	Kentucky Route 1904, 3 miles south of its junction with U.S. Route 62; 37°37′56″N 85°55′14″W	Elizabethtown	
72	William Sprigg House		January 4, 1989 (#88001736)	Kentucky Route 1375, 1 mile north of its junction with Kentucky Route 84; 37°33′55″N 85°58′46″W	Glendale	
73	Stader Hotel		October 5, 1988 (#88001751)	104 E. Main St. 37°48′34″N 85°58′57″W	Vine Grove	
74	Stark House		October 5, 1988 (#88001725)	0.4 miles west of the junction of Kentucky Route 1868 and Gilead Church/Star Mills Rd. 37°38′51″N 85°52′43″W	Glendale	
75	State Theatre	State Theatre	December 10, 1998 (#98001492)	205 W. Dixie Ave. 37°41′40″N 85°51′35″W	Elizabethtown	
76	John Stuart House		October 5, 1988 (#88001765)	St. Anthony Church Rd., 0.5 miles east of U.S. Route 31W; 37°34′36″N 85°51′05″W	Glendale	
77	Samuel B. Thomas House	Samuel B. Thomas House	October 5, 1988 (#88001797)	337 W. Poplar St. 37°41′57″N 85°51′48″W	Elizabethtown	
78	William Tichenor House		October 5, 1988 (#88001753)	Sonora-Upton Rd., 1 mile west of Upton; 37°30′20″N 85°54′08″W	Upton	
79	US Bullion Depository, Fort Knox, Kentucky	US Bullion Depository, Fort Knox, Kentucky	February 18, 1988 (#88000056)	Gold Vault Rd. and Bullion Boulevard; 37°53′00″N 85°57′55″W	Fort Knox	
80	US Post Office-Elizabethtown	US Post Office-Elizabethtown	October 5, 1988 (#88001810)	200 W. Dixie Ave. 37°41′39″N 85°51′34″W	Elizabethtown	
81	Jacob Van Meter House		October 5, 1988 (#88001746)	Kentucky Route 222, 0.6 miles west of Glendale; 37°37′02″N 85°55′45″W	Glendale	
82	Eliza Vertrees House	Eliza Vertrees House	October 5, 1988 (#88001809)	206 W. Poplar St. 37°41′42″N 85°51′30″W	Elizabethtown	
83	Vine Grove Historic District		October 5, 1988 (#88001815)	104-221 W. Main St. 37°48′36″N 85°59′01″W	Vine Grove	
84	West Point Historic District		November 15, 1996 (#96001344)	Roughly bounded by the Salt River, 2nd, South, 13th, Mulberry, and Elm Sts. 37°59′54″N 85°56′54″W	West Point	
85	West Point Hotel		October 5, 1988 (#88001790)	401 South St. 37°59′51″N 85°56′47″W	West Point	
86	White Mill		October 5, 1988 (#88001761)	Nolin River; 37°33′19″N 86°01′52″W	White Mills	
87	William Wilson House	William Wilson House	October 5, 1988 (#88001799)	200 Logan Ave. 37°42′02″N 85°50′43″W	Elizabethtown	
88	Horatio Wintersmith House	Horatio Wintersmith House	October 5, 1988 (#88001796)	221 W. Poplar St. 37°41′45″N 85°51′35″W	Elizabethtown	
89	George Woodard House	George Woodard House	March 3, 2003 (#02001467)	232 W. Poplar St. 37°41′46″N 85°51′38″W	Elizabethtown	
90	James Young House and Inn	James Young House and Inn	February 17, 1978 (#78001336)	109 Elm St. 38°00′02″N 85°56′40″W	West Point	

== Former listing ==
	Name on the Register	Image	Date listed	Date removed	Location	City or town	Description
1	John Hart House		April 30, 1980 (#80001536)	December 30, 1985	6 miles east of Elizabethtown	Elizabethtown	

== See also ==
- List of National Historic Landmarks in Kentucky
- National Register of Historic Places listings in Kentucky
