= Chestnut Grove =

Chestnut Grove may refer to:

in England

- Chestnut Grove School (London)

in the United States

(by state)

- Chestnut Grove School (Athens, Georgia), listed on the NRHP in Georgia
- Chestnut Grove (Glendale, Kentucky), listed on the NRHP in Kentucky
- Chestnut Grove, North Carolina
- Chestnut Grove, Tennessee
- Chestnut Grove, Albemarle County, Virginia
- Chestnut Grove, Buckingham County, Virginia
- Chestnut Grove, Lancaster County, Virginia
- Chestnut Grove (plantation), New Kent County, Virginia, birthplace of Martha Washington
