= Chestnut Grove, Virginia =

Chestnut Grove, Virginia may refer to:

- Chestnut Grove, Albemarle County, Virginia
- Chestnut Grove, Buckingham County, Virginia
- Chestnut Grove, Lancaster County, Virginia
- Chestnut Grove, Pittsylvania County, Virginia, renamed Whitmell, Virginia
