= Helm Place =

Helm Place may refer to:

- Helm Place (Elizabethtown, Kentucky), listed on the National Register of Historic Places in Hardin County, Kentucky
- Helm Place (Lexington, Kentucky), listed on the National Register of Historic Places in Fayette County, Kentucky
