= Glendale Historic District =

Glendale Historic District may refer to:

- Glendale Historic District (Glendale, Ohio), listed on the NRHP in Ohio
- Glendale Historic District (Glendale, Kentucky), listed on the NRHP in Hardin County, Kentucky
