= Lucinda Barbour Helm =

American author and religious activist (1839–1897)

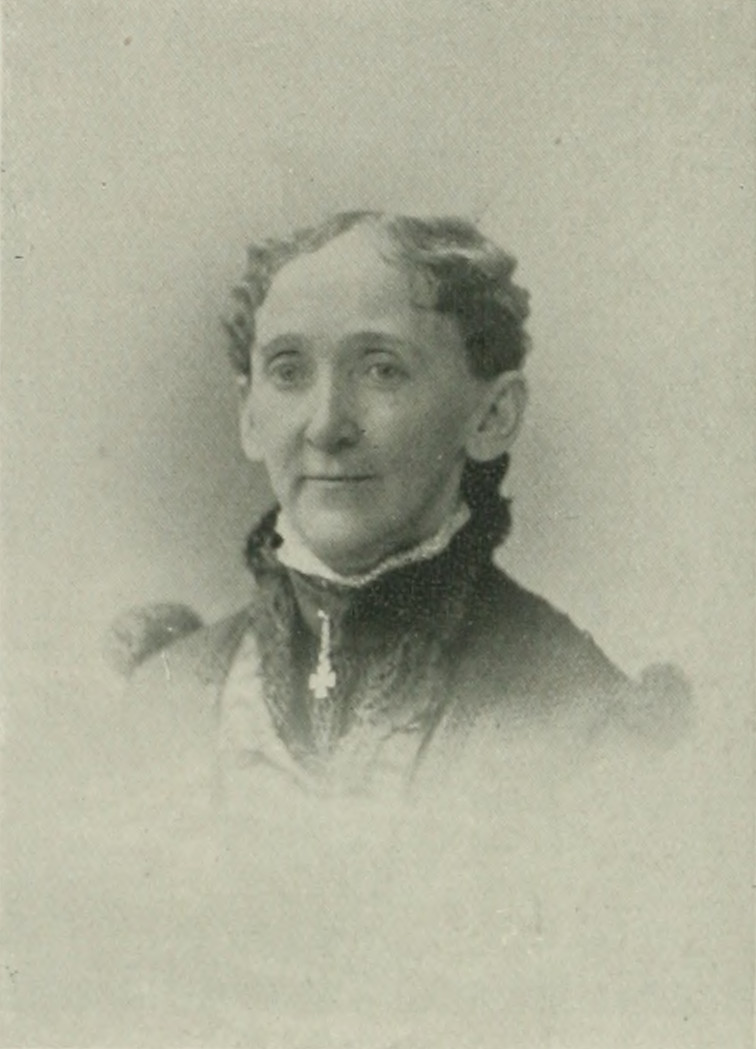
- Photo in A Woman of the Century
- Born: Lucinda Barbour Helm; December 23, 1839; Helm Place, near Elizabethtown, Kentucky, U.S.
- Died: November 15, 1897 (aged 57)
- Resting place: Helm Place
- Occupations: author; editor; religious activist
- Writing career
- Pen name: Lucile
- Language: English

Lucinda Barbour Helm (pen name, Lucile; December 23, 1839 – November 15, 1897) was a 19th-century American author, editor, and women's religious activist from Kentucky. She wrote sketches, short stories, and religious leaflets. Helm published one volume, Gerard: The Call of the Church Bell. She was an active member of the Woman's Foreign Missionary Society of the Methodist Episcopal Church and of the International Christian Workers' Association.

Helm was the founder of the Woman's Parsonage and Home Mission Society of the Methodist Episcopal Church, South. In 1892, the publication of a magazine called Our Homes was begun, with Helm as editor. In 1893, she resigned as General Secretary of the Woman's Parsonage and Home Mission Society because of overwork and spent her remaining years editing Our Homes. She died in 1897 is buried at her place of birth, Helm Place.

== Early life and education ==
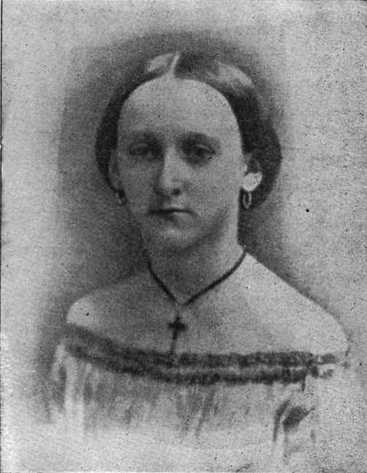
Lucinda Barbour Helm, age 13

Lucinda Barbour Helm was born in Helm Place, near Elizabethtown, Kentucky, December 23, 1839. She is the granddaughter of Benjamin Hardin, the satirist, humorist and jurist of Kentucky, and the daughter of John L. Helm, twice governor of Kentucky. Her paternal grandfather, Thomas Helm, went to Kentucky in American Revolutionary War times and settled near Elizabethtown. That place, known as Helm Place, is still in the possession of the family. Her mother, Lucinda B. Hardin, the oldest daughter of Benjamin Hardin, was a woman of culture. She early trained her children to a love for books. An important personage, who figured largely in the home of her childhood, was old Aunt Gilly. She was nurse to all the eleven children; but little Lucinda was preeminently her " chile," partly because her ill health so frequently made her require a nurse's care. When she was about 11 years old her father became governor of the state, succeeding J. J. Crittenden, who resigned to accept a place in President Taylor's cabinet. He removed his family at this time from their country home near Elizabethtown to the seat of government at Frankfort. Here she was brought into contact with new people, but she was glad when the family returned at the end of a year to their old home. Her father, after serving the first term as governor, applied himself to his profession of attorney for the three years following, and then became president of the Louisville and Nashville Railroad. Lucinda was proud of her father and wrote an article when she became older, calling it, "My Father". Helm's siblings included, Ben Hardin Helm, a lawyer, who married Mary Todd Lincoln's sister; Lizzie Barbour Helm, who married Horatio Washington Bruce; George Helm, lawyer; Emily Palmer Helm, and Mary Helm. Mary was, for several years the editor of Our Homes. She was also the author of a book on African-Americans in the South, and the author of The Society Novel: a protest and a warning.

Helm inherited from her mother a love for reading and a deep religious faith. At an early age she commenced to write poetry and prose under the pen-name "Lucile." Although often prostrated by illness and always very delicate, she advanced rapidly at school. She studied drawing and painting, was fond of horseback riding and of shooting-parties, but she refused to dance or engage in games that seemed to her inconsistent with a Christian life.

== Career ==
=== Early missionary work ===
When Helm was 18 years old, she published a strong article on the "Divinity of the Savior". She was seen every Sunday afternoon walking alone a mile in the country to an old farmhouse to hold an afternoon prayer service. Men, women, and children gathered to hear her speak, with open Bible in hand. Her mother desired her to visit Louisville in the winter, but upon arriving there, instead of attending the a round of social festivities, she went to one of the principal city missionaries, Mrs. Sad, offered her services, and learned much practical knowledge of city evangelization.

During the American Civil War, another brother died. She went to work as a correspondent for a large paper published in England called the Western News, and sent frequent letters to it giving war items. She made bandages for the wounded and clothes for the prisoners. The strain of the war so affected her nervous system that she came near to losing her eyesight, and for more than a year faced the possibility of blindness, but after going through treatment, she recovered. She was about 28 years old at the time of her father's death. It marked an epoch in her life with many changes in the famimly home, and she gave herself to religious work in a fuller measure even than before.

She was successful as a Sunday school teacher, and had faith in the power of childhood. She formed various societies and literary "clubs " where she found it practicable, for she believed organized effort to be an important factor in social and religious economics. One "society" known in Elizabethtown only by the name of "Miss Lucinda's Society" was composed of small boys, the simple pledge of membership being that they would not use profane or indecent language and not play marbles for "keeps." Helm said in an article entitled "Apples of Gold in Pictures of Silver", published in the St. Louis Christian Advocate in 1875: "We know not when our words may influence our fellow beings for good or evil, but the word must be spoken not only in due season, but 'fitly spoken,' that it may be precious like 'apples of gold in pictures of silver.'

When the Woman's Foreign Missionary Society was organized, in 1876, she was one of the most earnest and successful advocates of the cause. She wrote for the Woman's Missionary Advocate and for the Church papers in the interest of foreign missions. While her sister, Mary, was Corresponding Secretary of the Louisville Conference, Helm was the first in that Conference to send to the Secretary a paid-up list of subscribers. The Louisville Conference money was the first received by Mrs. Manier (who was then the agent), and she has said to her coworkers that but for it she could not have met the expense of the first issues of the Advocate. In all of Helm's local work, both of a religious and social nature, her sister, Mary, was her companion and coworker. After she became Secretary of the Woman's Department of Church Extension, and Mary was Assistant Secretary of the Woman's Foreign Missionary Society, they had adjoining rooms, where they did their work. Helm edited the leaflets for the Foreign Missionary Society. One of her articles, entitled "Seed-Time," was published in the Nashville Christian Advocate in 1880. Helm was interested in all mission fields, and was very anxious for the Woman's Foreign Missionary Society to open work in Brazil. Besides writing herself on this subject, she got Rev. J. J. Ransom, a returned missionary, to write two leaflets for her, and she made strong appeals to arouse the women to engage in the work.

=== Woman's Department of Church Extension ===
Helm believed in making all philanthropic and missionary work distinctively Church work. To this end she wrote for the Church papers. Many of her articles appeared in the Nashville Christian Advocate and in the St. Louis Christian Advocate. Through them, she became known to the entire Church. Many of the bishops and other dignitaries of the Church were her staunch friends. Soon after the department of Church Extension of the M. E. Church, South, was organized, in 1882, with Dr. David Morton as General Secretary, she went to him and told him she wanted to assist in that work in any way she could. He appreciated her commitment, and she began writing in the interest of Church Extension.

While George D. Prentice was editor of the Louisville Journal, she wrote many sketches for that paper. She afterwards wrote short stories for the Courier and the Courier Journal. She published one volume, Gerard: The Call of the Church Bell (Nashville, Tennessee, 1884).

Helm wrote many leaflets for both home and foreign missions, which were widely circulated, and she served Editor of Leaflets in the foreign missionary work. During these years, Helm and her sister, Mary, continued to live at Helm Place with her mother. After her mother's death in 1885, Helm, desiring the wider opportunities furnished by a city for Church work, went to reside with her eldest sister, Mrs. Judge Bruce, in Louisville.

Helm was requested by the Board of Church Extension to formulate a plan including constitution and bylaws for establishing a Woman's Department of Church Extension for parsonage-building, to be submitted to the Board of Church Extension held in January 1886. She did so and her paper was referred to a committee consisting of Bishop R. K. Hargrove (Chairman) and Rev. H. C. Settle and J. G. Carter, Esq. Her idea was to make provision in the constitution at that time for some phases of local home mission work, but this was strenuously opposed on the ground that it would embrace too much. In May 1886, the General Conference of the Methodist Episcopal Church, South authorized the Board of Church Extension to organize the woman's organization known as the Woman's Department of Church Extension, until 1890, when it received a more definite title, Woman's Parsonage and Home Mission Society. Helm was appointed the General secretary of the department, and her work grew rapidly from the very beginning. Helm went from one Conference to another, organizing Parsonage Societies and inspiring the women with a zeal for the work. Letters poured into her office from the Indian Mission, Montana, Oregon, California, and all of the Southern states and she replied to all of them. In all her explanatory leaflets and articles, and in her plans for the establishment of new departments of the work she wrote clearly, accurately, and with a mastery of the subject.

She was under extreme pressure during this time, working alone in her position. Upon her devolved the duty of giving to the whole Church information of the work. She had to prepare suitable literature. Thousands of letters and postals were written. At the same time the subject was kept continually before the Church at large through the Church papers; leaflets, programs, and blanks were made ready each quarter. Quarterly and annual reports were also carefully prepared. A certain amount of traveling had to be done, and Helm visited eleven Conferences ranging from Indian Mission to North Carolina. Only a few days during the entire four years that she served in this position did she receive clerical assistance. The Board of Church Extension desired to appropriate to her a salary of $600 a year, but she refused to receive it. Dr. Morton urged her to take it, and said: "It is a debt, and when you die it can be collected." The only reply she made to this was to add a statement to her will which released the board from any indebtedness to her.

=== Founder of the Woman's Parsonage and Home Mission Society of the Methodist Episcopal Church, South ===
Helm was a leader and an activist, and determined to make a plea at the General Conference of 1890, through the Board of Church Extension, for the enlargement of the charter for woman's work. Her plan was that, without detaching the name "Parsonage," this organization embrace other forms of home mission work; and while the work of building parsonages should still remain under the supervision of the Board of Church Extension, all other branches of the work should become independent of that board and come under the management of a Central Committee composed of competent women.

She presented her plans for the extension of the work to some of the Church authorities before the General Conference of 1890 convened, but even her stanchest friends thought it an unwise plan, full of risks. Again and again she went to Dr. Morton and some of the bishops, trying to show the imperative needs in the Church for a connectional organization known distinctively as home missions; but the objection was presented that the Church was not ready for such an organization. She was told that the Parsonage Society had hardly gotten a sure footing in the Church at that time, and by moving too fast, and undertaking to enlarge the work to such an extent, she would find it impracticable and calculated to do more harm than good. She insisted that it would not interfere with the parsonage work. She had found in her efforts to establish parsonage societies that the women of the Church were organized into all types of other societies; such as, "Ladies' Aids," "Pastors' Aids," "Dorcas's," "Sewing Society," "Social Society," "Young Ladies' Aids," all of which were doing home mission work in their own churches, and many were doing interdenominational work also. She wrote articles on the subject, and conducted a large correspondence, presenting the matter to the influential women as well as to the men of the Church. Her letters went to hundreds of representative women, but although some of them were largely in favor of her plans, there was little sympathy manifested by women as a whole. But in 1890, the plans were approved and Helm became the General Secretary. She retired in 1893.

=== Editorial work ===
Some of Helm's best work was done through the paper she edited, Our Homes, during the last six years of her life. She undertook the publishing of this paper in January 1892, soon after the formation of the Woman's Parsonage and Home Mission Society; this was one feature of the enterprise that elicited criticism. There was no money in the treasury for it, and many insisted that the organization was not large enough to sustain a paper. She felt confident, however, that it would add to the interest and extension of the work, and at a meeting of the Central Committee in September 1891, the decision was made and she took measures to arrange for its publication. She came to Nashville and spent a number of days with Mrs. Harriet C. Hargrove and Arabel Wilbur Alexander while she made arrangements at the Methodist Publishing House, and formulated her plans for the first issue of the paper. She decided to make her paper an eight-page quarterly, the subscription price to be twenty-five cents yearly. Upon her return to Louisville she prepared the first issue at the home of Mrs. George P. Kendrick. Three years later, in order to be near the Publishing House, she made Nashville her permanent home. Her financial management of the paper was such that within six months of the time it was determined upon to have a paper it was put upon a paying basis. She never allowed herself or her work to accumulate debts. In 1893 her paper was issued monthly, beginning with the August number. The subscription price was increased to fifty cents.

Although Helm kept the interests of the society ever before the Church through her paper, she did not devote the entire space to its work. Her sympathies were broad, and she gave her readers, as often as possible, articles and selections on the temperance movement, Salvation Army work, kindergarten methods, and other philanthropies of national interest. She also gave sketches of the lives of prominent writers, and selections from their works: Helen Hunt Jackson, MissF. R. Havergal, Madame Guyon, " Sister Dora," Rev. F. B. Meyer, and others. Her book reviews were especially good. She reviewed the books in our Reading Course and other philanthropic works, and also gave selections from Tolstoi's writings, Ian Maclaren's, and others. The paper for 1897 gives her last work.

== Personal life ==
Helm married the lawyer, Horatio Washington Bruce, in 1856. She was a member of the Woman's Foreign Missionary Society and of the International Christian Workers' Association. Helm was in Florida in the summer of 1897, and returned home weak. She died November 15, 1897.

== Selected works ==
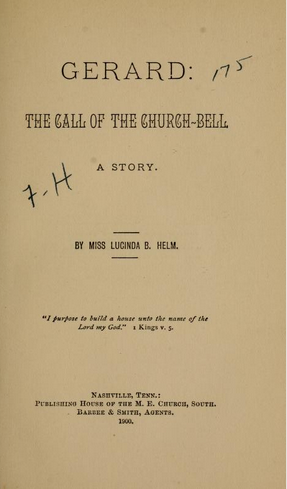
Gerard: The call of the church-bell

- 1884, Gerard: The Call of the Church Bell
