= Lynnland Female Institute =

Private women's college in Glendale, Kentucky, US

Coordinates: 37°34′45″N 85°54′24″W

- Type: Private liberal arts college Women's college
- Active: February 11, 1867–June 23, 1915
- Undergraduates: as many as 60 in 1891-92
- Location: Glendale, Kentucky, U.S.

Lynnland Female Institute was a private women's liberal arts college located in Glendale, Kentucky, a small community in Hardin County. The campus was originally located near the historic Louisville and Nashville Railroad midway between Glendale and the Nolin Station. It is one of the oldest women's colleges in Kentucky. The Lynnland Female Institute was founded by local Baptist leaders, who helped assure its continuation throughout its history. It was officially chartered by the Kentucky General Assembly in 1867 and closed as a college in 1915.

== Beginnings ==
Lynnland Female Institute was chartered on February 11, 1867, and opened soon aftward under the leadership of the local Baptist minister, Rev. G. A. Colson. In 1869, William F. Perry of Alabama (once the president of the East Alabama Female College in Tuskegee) came to serve as president of the Lynnland Female Institute. He recruited a teacher from Washington College in Virginia: the 20 year old John Peyton Hobson came to teach upon recommendation from his college president, Robert E. Lee. On June 29, 1871, Perry and Peter Eppes Harris purchased the school for $17,000 and eventually turned it co-educational as the Lynnland Military Institution (girls attended a separate department). But it closed in 1879 and Perry left for Bowling Green, Kentucky where he taught at Ogden College (a precursor to Western Kentucky University) until his death.

== Reopening as a college for women ==
In 1888 Professors Ed White and J. C. Elwood purchased the college and returned it to its former status as a college for women. Lynnland Female College is listed in federal reports for 1891-92 - with 2 female and 2 male professors teaching a total of 60 students (with a library of 3,000 volumes) -- and again in 1895 with E.W. Elrod as president. In 1896 the school was purchased by W. B. Gwynn and again made co-educational; and, on July 17, 1907, the Baptist Educational Association purchased the school. As of 1909, the Baptist minister Rev. J. B. Hunt served as president. The son of William Perry, Professor George Brown Perry, returned for one year and taught where he had attended as a youth during its days as a military institute.

== Closure ==
On June 23, 1915, Lynnland was sold to the trustees of the Kentucky Baptist Children's Home for use as an orphanage. Its 500-acre campus is currently lying unused since the orphanage (later called the Glendale Center) was relocated to Elizabethtown.

== See also ==
- Kentucky's List of current and historical women's universities and colleges in the U.S.

== Additional resources ==
- Solomon, Barbara Miller (1985). In the Company of Educated Women: A History of Women and Higher Education in America. New Haven: Yale University Press. ISBN 9780300033144.
