= Kentucky Route 1136 =

State highway in Kentucky, U.S.

Kentucky Route 1136
- KY 1136 highlighted in red

Route information
- Maintained by KYTC
- Length: 10.655 mi (17.148 km)

Major junctions
- South end: US 31W near Glendale Junction
- KY 222 at Glendale US 31W Byp. at Elizabethtown
- North end: US 31W / KY 61 at Elizabethtown

Location
- Country: United States
- State: Kentucky
- Counties: Hardin

Highway system
- Kentucky State Highway System; Interstate; US; State; Parkways
| ← KY 1135 | → KY 1137 |

Kentucky Route 1136 is a north–south rural secondary state highway located entirely in Hardin County in north-central Kentucky. The route is 10.655 miles (17.148 km) long and it mainly traverses the southern part of the county.

== Route description ==
The route begins at a junction with U.S. Route 31W south of Glendale Junction. It traverses Interstate 65 (I-65) via an overpass with no access to the freeway. The route then enters the town of Glendale, where it meets KY 222. It continues north-northeast to intersect U.S. Route 31W Bypass (US 31W Byp) before traversing the Wendell H. Ford Western Kentucky Parkway via an overpass and ending at a junction with the main alignment of US 31W and KY 61 within Elizabethtown city limits.

== Major intersections ==
The entire route is in Hardin County.

| Location | mi | km | Destinations | Notes |
|---|---|---|---|---|
| | 0.000 | 0.000 | US 31W (Dixie Highway) – Elizabethtown, Upton, Sonora | Southern terminus |
| Glendale | 2.768 | 4.455 | KY 1868 (New Glendale Road) | |
| Glendale | 3.942 | 6.344 | To KY 222 / I-65 | |
| Elizabethtown | | | To US 31W Byp. north / Western Kentucky Parkway east | |
| Elizabethtown | | | To US 31W (Dixie Highway) / KY 61 / I-65 / Western Kentucky Parkway – Elizabethtown, Hodgenville, Nashville, Louisville, Paducah | Northern terminus |
1.000 mi = 1.609 km; 1.000 km = 0.621 mi
