= Larue-Layman House =

Historic house in Kentucky, United States

- U.S. National Register of Historic Places
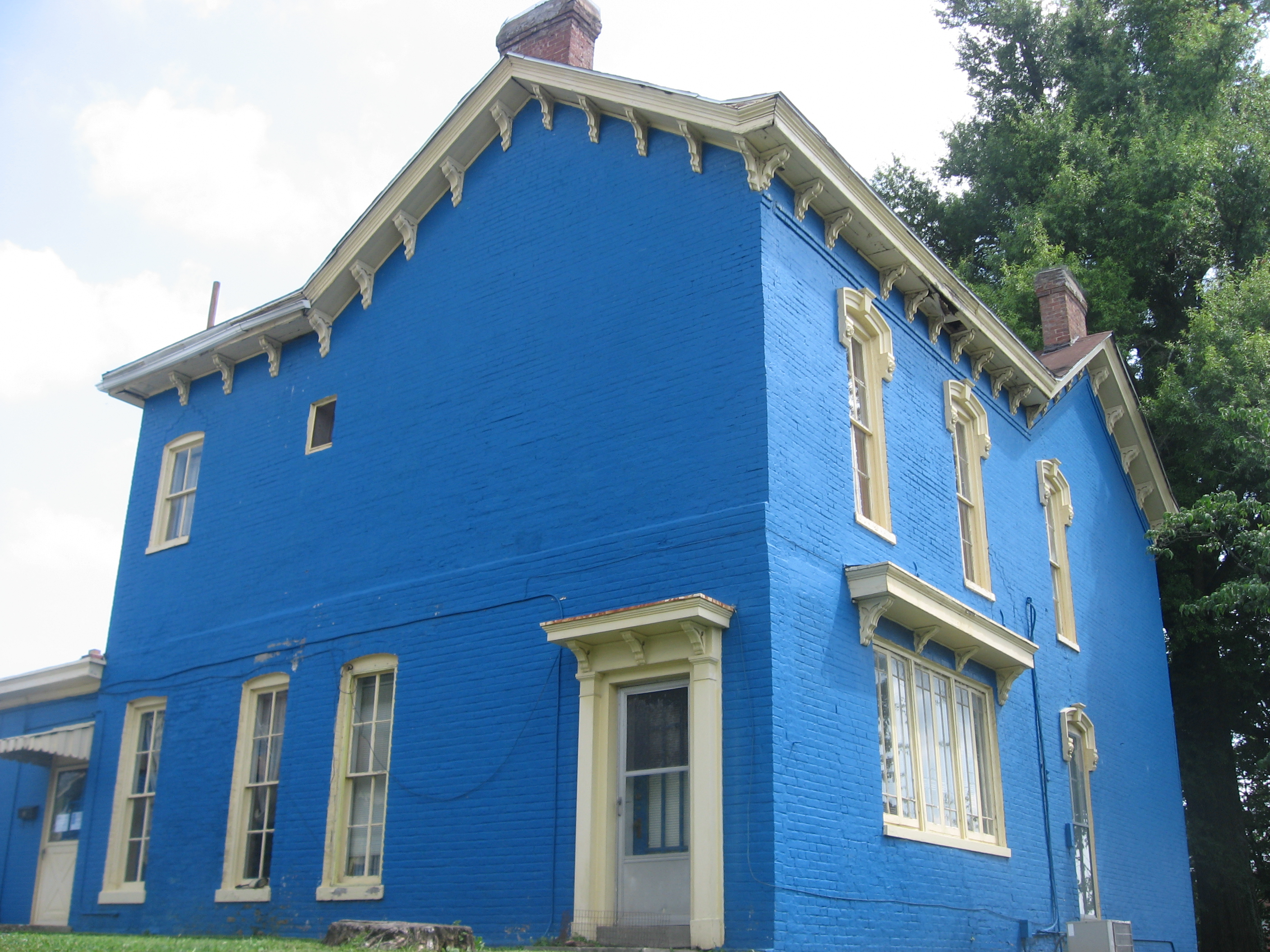
- The Larue-Layman house in 2011.

- Location within Kentucky Location within the United States
- Location: 115 W. Poplar Street, Elizabethtown, Kentucky, United States
- Coordinates: 37°41′43.1″N 85°51′28.3″W
- Built: 1831
- Architectural style: Italianate
- MPS: Hardin County MRA
- NRHP reference No.: 88001794
- Added to NRHP: 1988

The Larue-Layman House is a two-story brick house in Elizabethtown, Kentucky, that was added to the National Register of Historic Places in 1988.

The house was originally built in 1831 as a small brick home for Jacob Warren LaRue, a member of a local pioneer family and the husband of Eliza Helm, who was the sister of Governor John LaRue Helm. Extensive remodeling was performed c. 1863 for George M. Cresap, the brick on the west and south facades and little else remain from the 1831 section. The 1860s remodeling produced an asymmetrical Italianate design. A one-story porch with Doric columns replaced the original on the main (south) facade c. 1910, a one-story addition was added to the north facade c. 1920.

The house is notable example of the Italianate residences built in Elisabethtown in the 19th century.

== See also ==
- LaRue family
- Benjamin Helm House
- Helm Place (Elizabethtown, Kentucky)
- National Register of Historic Places in Hardin County, Kentucky
