= Morrison Lodge =

- U.S. National Register of Historic Places
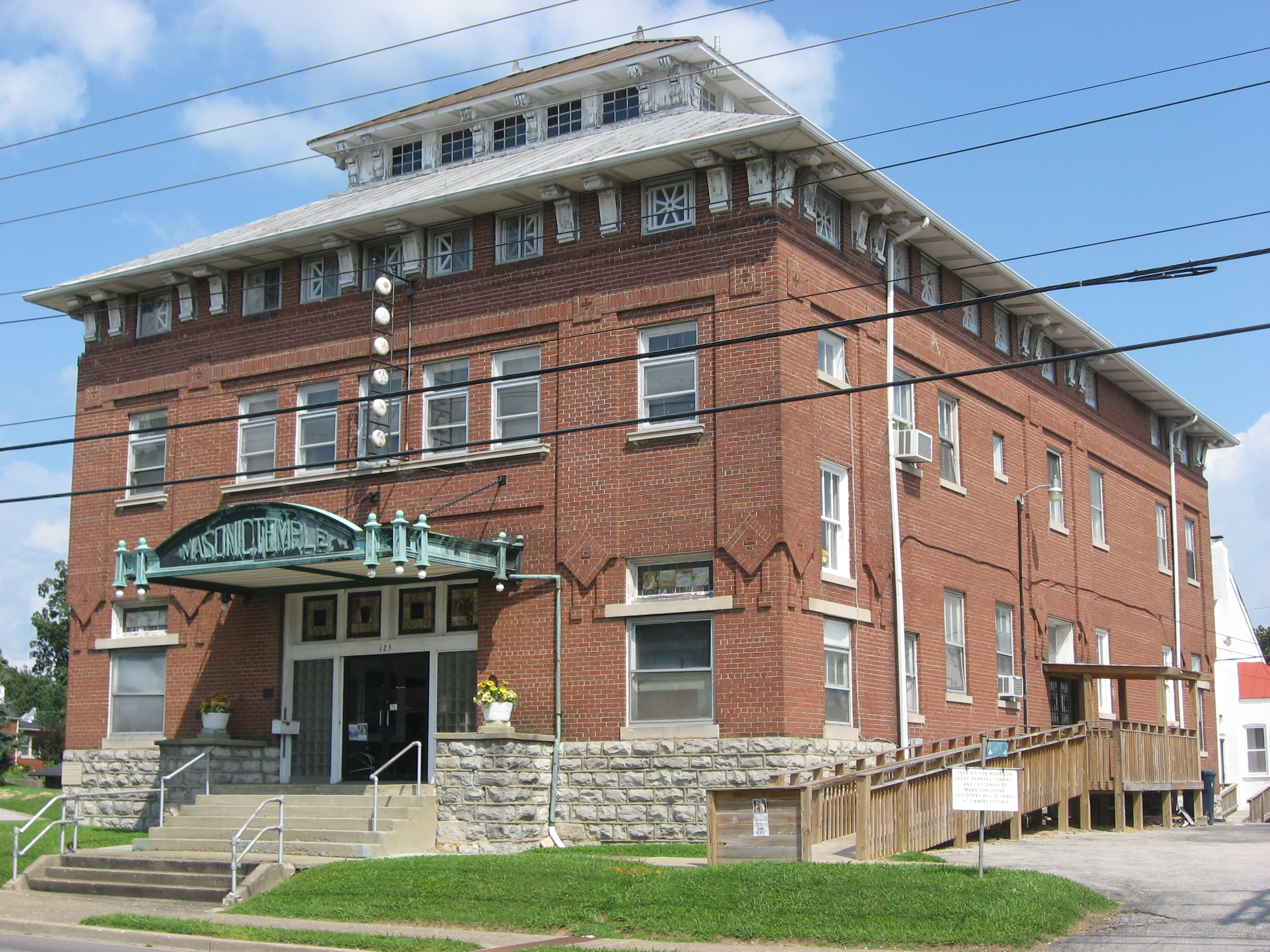

- Location within Kentucky Location within the United States
- Location: 121 N. Mulberry St., Elizabethtown, Kentucky
- Coordinates: 37°41′41″N 85°51′30″W
- Area: less than one acre
- Built: 1913
- Architectural style: Arts and Crafts
- MPS: Hardin County MRA
- NRHP reference No.: 88001804
- Added to NRHP: October 5, 1988

Morrison Lodge, at 125 N. Mulberry St. in Elizabethtown, Kentucky, is a historic Arts and Crafts-style Masonic building. It was listed on the National Register of Historic Places in 1988.

It is a three-story brick building built in 1913 on a stone foundation. It has a "hipped and monitor roof". Its eaves are supported by large paired brackets.

It was deemed "notable for its association with the Morrison Lodge, No. 76 F&AM and its architectural character. Morrison Lodge was chartered on August 26, 1823 and was one of the first chartered Masonic lodges in Kentucky. Early masters of the Masonic Lodge included Benjamin Helm [see Benjamin Helm House] and Governor John L. Helm. ... The building is Hardin County's best example of the commercial Arts and Crafts style and has retained its original detailing. Notable details include the large eave brackets, monitor roof and stained glass at the doorway windows. The building has not been altered since its construction and displays its original character."
