= Benjamin Helm House =

Historic house in Kentucky, United States

- U.S. National Register of Historic Places
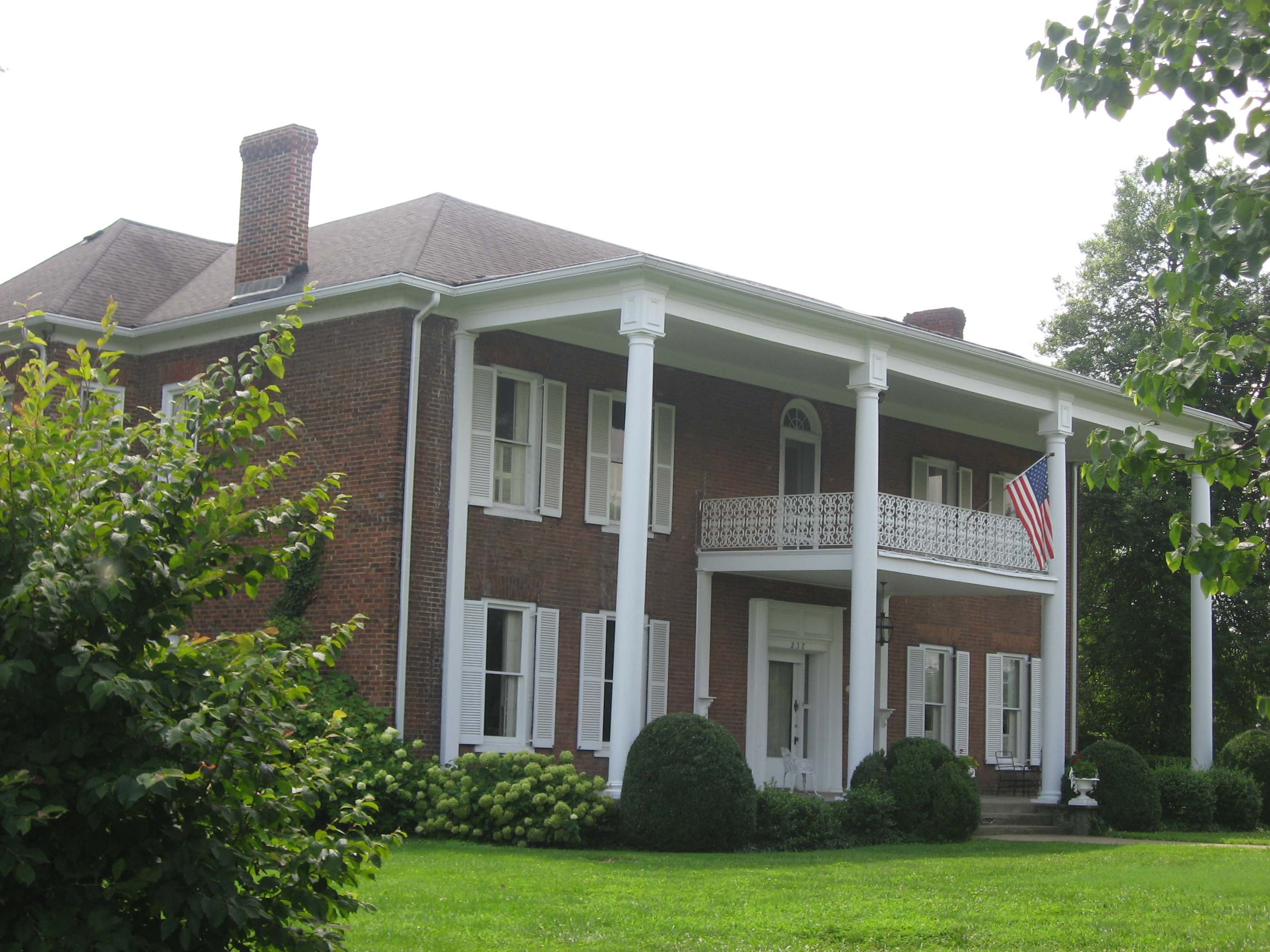
- The Benjamin Helm House in 2011.

- Location within Kentucky Location within the United States
- Location: 238 Helm Avenue, Elizabethtown, Kentucky, United States
- Coordinates: 37°41′38.2″N 85°51′48.6″W
- Built: 1816
- MPS: Hardin County MRA
- NRHP reference No.: 88001801
- Added to NRHP: 1988

The Benjamin Helm House is a two-story brick house in Elizabethtown, Kentucky, that was built in 1816 and added to the National Register of Historic Places in 1988. It is significant as the home of Benjamin Helm, an early settler of Elizabethtown. He made the first survey of the town and later became a wealthy local businessman, dying in 1858. He was the uncle of Governor John L. Helm, and great uncle of Confederate general Benjamin Hardin Helm.

The house was originally built in the Federal style. Two wings were removed and several additions added such that the house itself is no longer architecturally significant.

== See also ==
- Helm Place (Elizabethtown, Kentucky)
- Larue-Layman House
- LaRue family
- National Register of Historic Places listings in Hardin County, Kentucky
