= 1867 Kentucky gubernatorial election =

- August 5, 1867
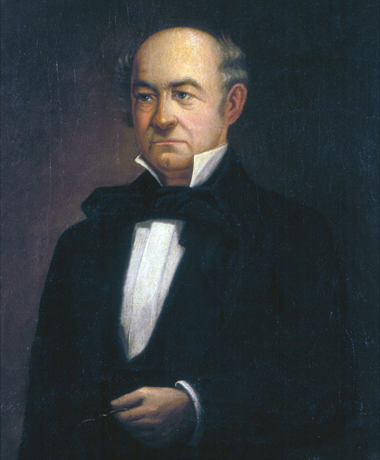

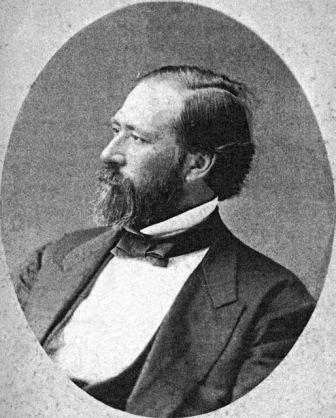

Nominee	John L. Helm	Sidney M. Barnes	William B. Kinkead
Party	Democratic	Republican	Conservative
Popular vote	90,216	33,939	13,167
Percentage	65.70%	24.72%	9.58%
- County results Helm: 40–50% 50–60% 60–70% 70–80% 80–90% >90% Barnes: 40–50% 50–60% 60–70% 70–80% 80–90% >90% Kinkead: 40–50%
Governor before election
Thomas E. Bramlette
Democratic
Elected Governor
John L. Helm
Democratic

The 1867 Kentucky gubernatorial election was held on August 5, 1867, in order to elect the governor of Kentucky. Democratic nominee and former acting Whig governor John L. Helm defeated Republican nominee Sidney M. Barnes and Conservative nominee William B. Kinkead.

== General election ==
On election day, August 5, 1867, former acting governor and Democratic nominee John L. Helm won the election by a margin of 56,277 votes against his foremost opponent Republican nominee Sidney M. Barnes, thereby retaining Democratic control over the office of governor. Helm was sworn in as the 24th governor of Kentucky on September 3, 1867.

=== Results ===
Kentucky gubernatorial election, 1867
Party	Candidate	Votes	%
Democratic	John L. Helm	90,216	65.70
Republican	Sidney M. Barnes	33,939	24.72
Conservative	William B. Kinkead	13,167	9.58
Total votes		137,322	100.00
Democratic hold			
