= Blue Ball Church =

- U.S. National Register of Historic Places
- Location: Blue Ball Church Rd., 0.6 miles south of its junction with Kentucky Routes 220 and 1375, near Howe Valley, Kentucky
- Coordinates: 37°43′32″N 86°02′14″W
- Area: 3.4 acres (1.4 ha)
- Built: 1849
- MPS: Hardin County MRA
- NRHP reference No.: 88001727
- Added to NRHP: October 4, 1988

Blue Ball Church, in Hardin County, Kentucky near Howe Valley, was built in 1849. It was listed on the National Register of Historic Places in 1988. It is also known as Blueball Baptist Church or Blue Ball Baptist Church.

It is a one-story gable-front brick church, with brick laid in common bond, on a limestone foundation. A two-story frame addition extended the building to the rear in c.1950. A two-story annex, also to the rear, was built by 2008.

The church was deemed "a notable example of an ante-bellum gable front church. The church is the only ante-bellum brick church located in the county outside of Elizabethtown and is a good example of an early brick church constructed by congregations in the early to mid-19th century. The building retains its original entrance, windows and brick detailing."
