= Dr. Clyde Carroll House =

Historic house in Kentucky, United States

- U.S. National Register of Historic Places
- Location within Kentucky Location within the United States
- Location: Dead Man's Cave Rd., White Mills, Kentucky
- Coordinates: 37°33′31″N 86°01′46″W
- Area: 2 acres (0.81 ha)
- Built: 1903
- Architectural style: Side passage plan
- MPS: Hardin County MRA
- NRHP reference No.: 88001764
- Added to NRHP: October 4, 1988

Dr. Clyde Carroll House, on Dead Man's Cave Rd. in White Mills, Kentucky is a historic house built in 1903. It was listed on the National Register of Historic Places in 1988.

It is a two-story log and frame house with a one-story attached commercial building. It was built originally as a double pen log structure in c. 1840. It was expanded into side passage plan style in 1903, including with addition of a one-story rear frame ell. It has a one-story porch with Doric-style columns.

It was deemed "notable for its association with the White Mills resort complex and as an intact example of a rural doctor's office and residence."
