= Ditto-Prewitt House =

Historic house in Kentucky, United States

- U.S. National Register of Historic Places
- U.S. Historic district – Contributing property
- Location within Kentucky Location within the United States
- Location: 306 Elm St., West Point, Kentucky
- Coordinates: 37°59′58″N 85°56′47″W
- Area: less than one acre
- Built: 1826
- Architectural style: Central passage plan
- Part of: West Point Historic District (ID96001344)
- MPS: Hardin County MRA
- NRHP reference No.: 88001786

Significant dates
- Added to NRHP: October 4, 1988
- Designated CP: November 15, 1996

The Ditto-Prewitt House, at 306 Elm St. in West Point, Kentucky, is a historic house built in 1826. It was listed on the National Register of Historic Places in 1988.

It is a two-story brick central passage plan five-bay house. In c.1960 a one-story porch with wrought-iron posts was added.

It was deemed "notable for its role in the commercial history of West Point and as a center for military operations during the Civil War. The house was built in 1826 for Abraham Ditto, a prominent West Point merchant, and his brother-in-law, Samuel Lansdale. They had the house built, as an inn to supply lodging for Ohio River travellers. West Point was a major port along the Ohio River in the 19th century and it was one of several inns supplying overnight lodging along the river. The inn was built on the bluff overlooking the river and was operated by Ditto for several years. Later Ditto made the building his residence. During the Civil War, the house was used for three years as a military hospital and as a base hospital for the 9th Michigan Infantry. After the Civil War the house was purchased by Thomas Reed who used the building as a hotel. Known as the Reed Place, the hotel was in operation until the early 1900s. The property was purchased about 1905 by Dr. J.V. Prewitt who used the building as his residence and doctor's office. The building is presently used as a boarding house. The house was heavily damaged in the flood of 1937 but its essential form and original plan remain."

== See also ==
- Abraham Ditto House
- National Register of Historic Places listings in Hardin County, Kentucky
