= Long Marsh Run =

River in the United States

Coordinates: 39.1839°N 77.8521°W

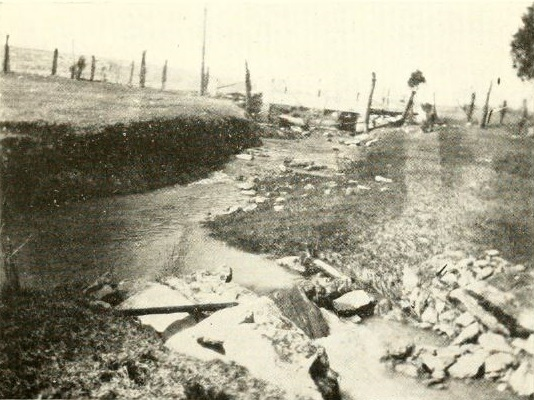
View of Long Marsh Run, looking upstream from Villa LaRue, around 1920.

Long Marsh Run is a small stream located in the Shenandoah Valley along the border of Virginia and West Virginia. A tributary of the Shenandoah River, Long Marsh Run's headwaters is about three miles northeast of Berryville, Virginia, where it flows east into West Virginia and thence into the Shenandoah.

Long Marsh Run was first settled by the LaRue family in the 1740s. Today, four historic homes associated with the LaRue family are located along the banks of the creek. In 1996, the Long Marsh Run Rural Historic District was established to help preserve the historic buildings and the rural character of the land for future generations.

== See also ==
- LaRue family
- List of rivers of Virginia
- List of rivers of West Virginia
