= William Tichenor House =

Historic house in Kentucky, United States

- U.S. National Register of Historic Places
- Location within Kentucky Location within the United States
- Location: Sonora-Upton Rd., 1 mile west of Upton, Kentucky
- Coordinates: 37°30′20″N 85°54′08″W
- Area: 1 acre (0.40 ha)
- Built: c.1820
- Architectural style: Double pen
- MPS: Hardin County MRA
- NRHP reference No.: 88001753
- Added to NRHP: October 5, 1988

The William Tichenor House, near Upton, Kentucky, is a historic house built around 1820. It was listed on the National Register of Historic Places in 1988.

It was built as a two-story dogtrot-style double pen house. The breezeway was later enclosed (c.1910). A separate log kitchen was linked by a frame addition c.1900.

It became the home of the William Tichenor family; William Tichenor was a shareholder in the 1896 formation of the Sonora Bank and he had a large farm south of Sonora.

It was deemed notable "as a relatively unaltered example of a two-story dogtrot style home. It is one of the five most significant dogtrot log homes located in the county and retains its original plan."
