= Abraham Ditto House =

Historic house in Kentucky, United States

- U.S. National Register of Historic Places
- U.S. Historic district – Contributing property
- Location within Kentucky Location within the United States
- Location: 204 Elm St., West Point, Kentucky
- Coordinates: 37°59′59″N 85°56′44″W
- Area: less than one acre
- Built: 1823
- Architectural style: Federal
- Part of: West Point Historic District (ID96001344)
- MPS: Hardin County MRA
- NRHP reference No.: 88001789

Significant dates
- Added to NRHP: October 4, 1988
- Designated CP: November 15, 1996

The Abraham Ditto House, at 204 Elm St. in West Point, Kentucky, is a historic house built in 1823. It was listed on the National Register of Historic Places in 1988.

It is a two-story brick house with simple Federal-style detailing, with brick laid in Flemish bond. It has an interior end brick chimney. Its front includes a c.1890 glass and frame door with a single-light transom. The interior includes original Federal-style fluted mantles.

It was deemed "notable for its role in the commercial history of West Point. The building was constructed in 1823 for Abraham Ditto as an inn for river travellers. It is one of the oldest buildings remaining in West Point and operated as the Ditto House in the mid-1800s. It was later known as the Riverview House before closing ca. 1870."

== See also ==
- Ditto-Prewitt House
- National Register of Historic Places listings in Hardin County, Kentucky
