= West Point Historic District (West Point, Kentucky) =

Historic district in Kentucky, United States

- U.S. National Register of Historic Places
- U.S. Historic district
- Location within Kentucky Location within the United States
- Location: Roughly bounded by the Salt River, 2nd, South, 13th, Mulberry, and Elm Sts., West Point, Kentucky
- Coordinates: 37°59′54″N 85°56′54″W
- Area: 55 acres (22 ha)
- Built: 1829
- Built by: multiple
- Architect: multiple
- Architectural style: Bungalow/craftsman, Queen Anne, Federal
- MPS: Hardin County MRA
- NRHP reference No.: 96001344
- Added to NRHP: November 15, 1996

The West Point Historic District in West Point, Kentucky is a 55 acres (22 ha) historic district which was listed on the National Register of Historic Places in 1996.

The district is roughly bounded by the Salt River, 2nd, South, 13th, Mulberry, and Elm Sts. and dates from 1829.

It includes 75 contributing buildings as well as 62 non-contributing buildings and one contributing object. Six properties were already separately NRHP listed. Resources include:

- James Young House, separately NRHP-listed
- Ditto-Prewitt House, (1826) separately NRHP-listed
- Applegate-Fisher House, separately NRHP-listed
- Kentucky and Indiana Bank (c.1901), separately NRHP-listed
- Abraham Ditto House (c.1840), separately NRHP-listed
- Hardy Hotel/West Point Hotel (1902), separately NRHP-listed

The listing was consistent with guidelines established in a 1986 study of historic resources in Hardin County.
