= Applegate-Fisher House =

- Applegate--Fisher House
- U.S. National Register of Historic Places
- U.S. Historic district – Contributing property
- Location within Kentucky Location within the United States
- Location: 404 Elm St., West Point, Kentucky
- Coordinates: 37°59′58″N 85°56′50″W
- Area: less than one acre
- Built: 1846
- Built by: William Brown
- Architectural style: Greek Revival, Central passage plan
- Part of: West Point Historic District (ID96001344)
- MPS: Hardin County MRA
- NRHP reference No.: 88001787

Significant dates
- Added to NRHP: October 4, 1988
- Designated CP: November 15, 1996

The Applegate-Fisher House, at 404 Elm St. in West Point, Kentucky, was built in 1846. It was listed on the National Register of Historic Places in 1988.

It was deemed significant as "a notable example of a central passage plan brick residence from the early 19th century. The house is also notable as a center of military activity during the Civil War. The house was built, in 1846 for owner Stacy Applegate by mason William Brown. The house was designed in a central passage plan with Greek Revival detailing is the window lintels and door surround. Applegate was a merchant in West Point and operated a large lumber yard which supplied wood to the river steamboats. In 1861, the house was used as the headquarters for Union General William T. Sherman during his troops' occupation of the town. West Point was a major supply point for Union forces on the Ohio River and the house served as headquarters for other officers during the war. In 1874 the house was sold to Judge George Fisher and it has remained in his descendant's families ever since. The original porches of the house were washed away in the 1937 flood but few other changes have occurred to the structure."
