= Chestnut Grove (Glendale, Kentucky) =

- U.S. National Register of Historic Places
- Location within Kentucky
- Nearest city: Glendale, Kentucky
- Coordinates: 37°37′00″N 85°55′02″W
- Area: 2 acres (0.81 ha)
- Built: 1876
- Built by: Lott, Joseph
- Architectural style: Italianate
- MPS: Hardin County MRA
- NRHP reference No.: 88001731
- Added to NRHP: October 4, 1988

The Chestnut Grove, in Hardin County, Kentucky near Glendale, Kentucky, was built in 1876. It was listed on the National Register of Historic Places in 1988.

It is a two-story, brick Italianate house, with brick laid in common bond, built upon a brick foundation. Its front facade has four bays and a one-story porch with milled posts and dentils. The south facade has another one-story porch with a shed roof, milled posts, and vergeboard decoration. It has a two-story rear wing.

The interior includes original cast iron mantles and an Italianate-style staircase.

It is located off Kentucky Route 222 about 1 mile (1.6 km) west of Glendale.
