= LaRue family =

Family of American pioneers

The LaRue Family
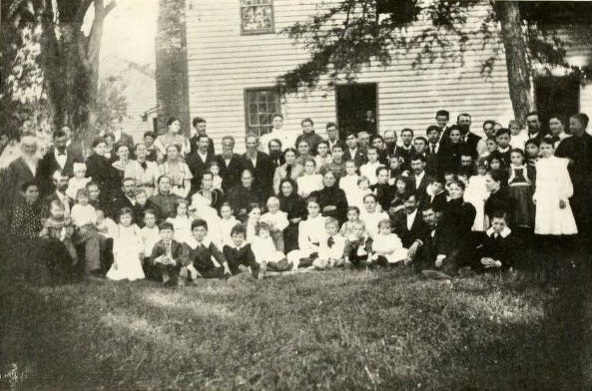
- The Castleman and LaRue families in 1898, on the 90th birthday of Sarah LaRue Castleman, who is sitting in the center of the photograph in between two of her daughters. The celebration was held at the home built by Jacob LaRue near Hodgenville, Kentucky, in 1800.
- Current region: Virginia and Kentucky
- Origin: United States
- Connected families: Hodgen, Helm, Castleman
- Estate: Claremont, Bloomfield, Villa LaRue

The LaRue family was a family of American pioneers, primarily in Virginia and Kentucky, in the 18th and 19th centuries.

== Name ==
The name "LaRue" is French and was spelled in many different ways over the years. Today the most common form is "Larrew" "LaRue" or "Larue", but other forms include "Larew", "LeRoux" and "LaRoux", "LaRu", "Laro", "Laroe", "l'Rue" and "l'Roe", "de la Rue" and "de la Rew", "Lerue" and "Lerew", and sometimes as only one syllable, such as "Rue" or "Roux".

== History ==
The LaRue family and its descendants trace their ancestry back to the French Huguenot Abraham LeRoux, who sailed to America with his family around 1680 as part of a mass exodus from France. According to LaRue descendant and author of Six Generations of LaRue and Allied Families, Otis M. Mather, several attempts to trace Abraham's family to a particular individual or locality in France have been unsuccessful. However, Don Holland Watson began the search in 1961 and, along with his two sisters, visited Germany and France on several occasions, tracing the family from the sub-province of Lalloeu in France to Mannheim, in Germany, and from there to the US, then tracking the family until modern times, all across the US in personal visits. The photograph shown here was duplicated with Don, his wife Margarete, and dozens of LaRue family descendants in 1998. The research is current as of 2015. All of it has been posted online, at Rootsweb and Ancestry.com, originally titled "LaRue and Allied Families." Although there are dozens of family traditions describing in various ways how Abraham and his family first arrived in America, all sources agree that some of the LaRues were murdered during or soon after the Massacre of St. Bartholomew in 1572, and afterward scattered across Europe and, eventually, America, where several members of the family were reunited.

Abraham LeRoux (LaRue) settled in New Jersey, where he died in 1712, leaving behind a son named Peter. Peter had three sons of his own: Abraham, Isaac, and Jacob, from which sprang the LaRue families of Virginia and Kentucky. In 1743, Isaac LaRue purchased his first 250-acre parcel of farm land along a little stream known as Long Marsh Run in the Shenandoah Valley, in what is now part of Clarke County, Virginia. Future President George Washington, whose family lived nearby, surveyed the land for Isaac after the sale. Isaac built a log cabin to live in and, later, a two-story, coursed limestone house named Claremont, which was completed in 1778. His son Jacob settled nearby and in 1775 completed his home, Bloomfield. Another son named Jabez built his home, Villa LaRue, further to the east in the 1790s. The three houses have survived and are now part of the Long Marsh Run Rural Historic District, near Berryville, Virginia. Isaac acquired thousands of more acres of land over the years, partly with the help of a friend and neighbor named Squire Boone, who was the brother of Daniel Boone.

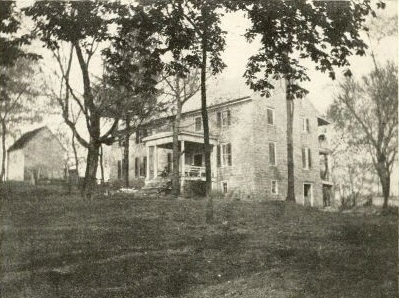
Bloomfield, seen here about 1920, is the oldest LaRue home still standing.

Over the next couple of generations, the LaRue family spread west into Kentucky and settled near what later developed into the town of Hodgenville, in LaRue County. Jacob LaRue sold Bloomfield to his brother James and built a new home near Hodgenville in 1800. Just nine years later, on February 12, 1809, future president Abraham Lincoln was born in a log cabin on the Sinking Spring Farm, amidst "scores of descendants of Isaac LaRue, Sr." Three LaRues are believed to have been present during Abraham Lincoln's birth: Mary Brooks LaRue Enlow, her daughter Margaret "Peggy" LaRue Walters and her cousin Rebecca Hodgen Keith. According to LaRue family tradition, Mary Enlow assisted Nancy Hanks Lincoln in delivering her baby, who was mistakenly thought to be named after Mary's sixteen-year-old son, Abraham Enlow, because Abraham had helped Thomas Lincoln in finding assistance for his pregnant wife earlier that day. They were unaware that Abraham was named after his paternal grandfather. .

A few years later, the Lincoln family moved to a new home about five miles away, but Abraham often returned to visit Hodgen's grist mill, near his birthplace. At the time, Hodgen's Mill was owned by Robert and Sarah LaRue Hodgen. Abraham probably spent much of his time in the Hodgen home, which was right next to the mill. Abraham's schoolmate and childhood friend, Austin Gollaher, later wrote in his book The Boyhood of Abraham Lincoln that it was from "his mother and from Mrs. Hodgen Abraham learned his A-B-C's". He also claimed that Sarah's son, John Hodgen, was Lincoln's "childhood hero". The Lincoln family eventually moved away to Indiana in 1816, when Abraham was nearly eight years old. He never again saw the place of his birth. Hodgen's Mill became the town of Hodgensville just a few years later.

During the Civil War, the LaRue family was split in two. In the 1840 census it was listed that John LaRue owned two slaves. Most remained loyal to the Union, but several descendants served the Confederacy. On the Confederate side, one LaRue became a brigadier general, while another rose to the rank of major. Many others served in lesser positions and in the ranks of the Confederate Army. On the Union side, one man was about to be promoted to colonel when he was elected to serve in Congress. Several others served as captains and lieutenants, enough to "officer a regiment", according to Mather.

Benjamin Hardin Helm was the son of Governor John LaRue Helm and the brother-in-law of Abraham Lincoln through his wife Emilie Todd, who was a half-sister of Mary Todd Lincoln. Helm and Lincoln were close friends before the outbreak of the Civil War, but were driven apart like so many other families at the time. Helm later joined the Confederate Army, rose to the rank of brigadier general, and took command of the 1st Kentucky Brigade, better known as the Orphan Brigade. Helm was mortally wounded by a sharpshooter in the Battle of Chickamauga in 1863, while leading his men into action against a well-fortified Union line. Lincoln and Mary were greatly disturbed when they heard the news of the death of their old friend, and had to go into private mourning in the White House. Lincoln also allowed Helm's widow, Emilie, to pass through Union lines to visit him and his wife.

Over the years, many LaRues went west, settling in Michigan, Iowa, Arkansas, Kansas, California, Texas, Oregon, and elsewhere. The most successful was Hugh McElroy LaRue, who followed the Oregon Trail and eventually settled in California, becoming one of the founding pioneers of Sacramento. In addition to raising crops and horses, Hugh served as sheriff of Sacramento County, member of the California Assembly, the director of the State Agricultural Association, a railroad commissioner and the president of the Sacramento Society of California Pioneers.

== Notable family members ==
- Anthoine, Abraham I, Abraham II, the Immigrant, Peter LaRue
- Isaac LaRue Sr. (1712–1795); Virginia pioneer, original owner of Claremont
- Jacob LaRue (1744–1821); Virginia pioneer, original owner of Bloomfield
- John LaRue (1746–1792); Kentucky pioneer, namesake for LaRue County, Kentucky
- Jabez LaRue (1768–1823); Virginia pioneer, original owner of Villa LaRue
- Hugh McElroy LaRue (1830–1906); California pioneer, Sheriff of Sacramento County, California
- Mary Brooks LaRue Enlow (1766–1843); Midwife for the birth of Abraham Lincoln
- Sarah LaRue Hodgen (1757–1825); Wife of Kentucky pioneer Robert Hodgen, helped teach Abraham Lincoln how to read
- John Hodgen (1783–1850); Childhood friend of Abraham Lincoln, son of Robert and Sarah LaRue Hodgen
- Rebecca Hodgen Keith (1784–1845); Wife of Major General John Thomas, daughter of Robert and Sarah LaRue Hodgen
- William Anderson Hodgen (1824–1850s); Entire family massacred by Indians in Oregon Territory, son of John and Diedamia LaRue Hodgen
- Philip Oscar Hodgen (1846–1894); Escaped Andersonville Prison during the Civil War, grandson of John and Diedamia LaRue Hodgen
- John LaRue Helm (1802–1867); State Senator and Governor of Kentucky
- Benjamin Hardin Helm (1831–1863); Confederate Brigadier General, Abraham Lincoln's brother-in-law, son of John LaRue Helm
- George Helm Yeaman (1829–1908); Minister to Denmark, Member of the United States House of Representatives from Kentucky, grandson of George and Rebecca LaRue Helm
- Margaret Helm Clay (1779–1851); Wife of Kentucky pioneer Colonel Henry Clay, daughter of Joseph and Rebecca LaRue Helm
- Bartell LaRue (1932–1990); American voice actor
- Custer LaRue (b. 1953); Early Renaissance and Baroque soprano vocalist, daughter of James Wilmore LaRue, lead singer for The Baltimore Consort between 1983 and 2004
- Stevie Ray Vaughan (1954–1990); guitarist, fourth great-grandson of Jacob LaRue (1744–1821)
- Rusty LaRue (b. 1973); Professional basketball player and coach
- Austin LaRue (b. 2004); Collegiate American football player
- Fred LaRue (1928–2004); Member of the Committee to Re-elect the President, first Watergate defendant sent to prison
- Terry LaRue (b. 1956); former executive with The Coca-Cola Company in South America
- Wayne LaRue (1929–2014); superintendent with Independence MO Power & Light; he met several times with President Harry S. Truman in the course of his duties, making 3 generations of LaRues interacting with U.S. Presidents

== Gallery ==
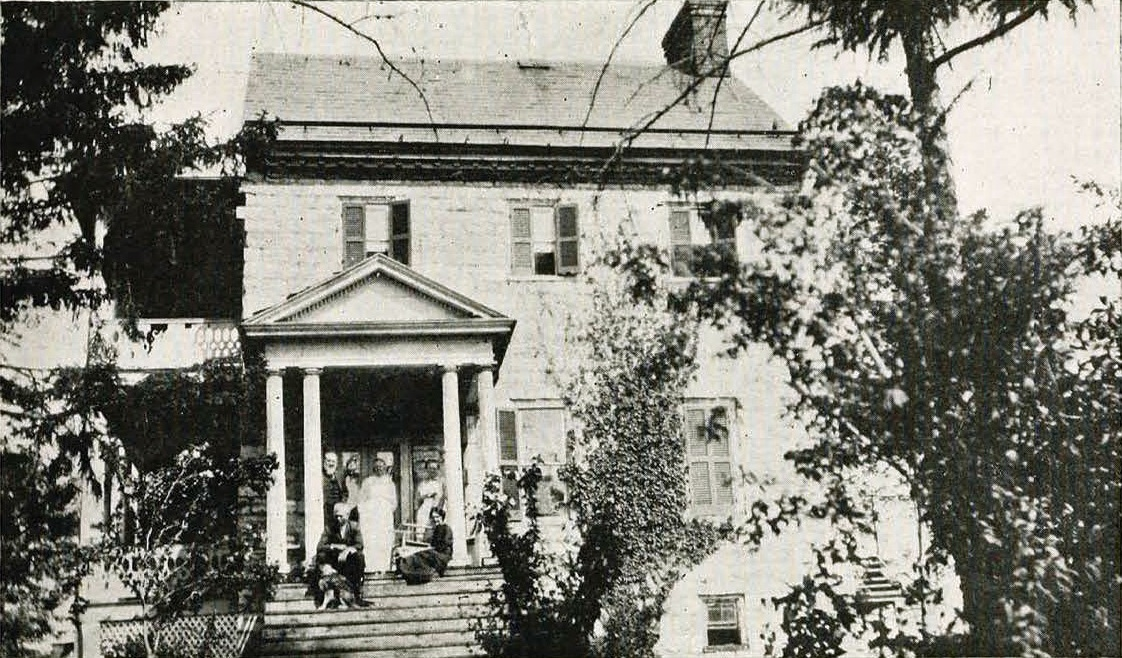
Villa LaRue around 1920. James LaRue Irvin Vanmetre is the man standing at the upper left.

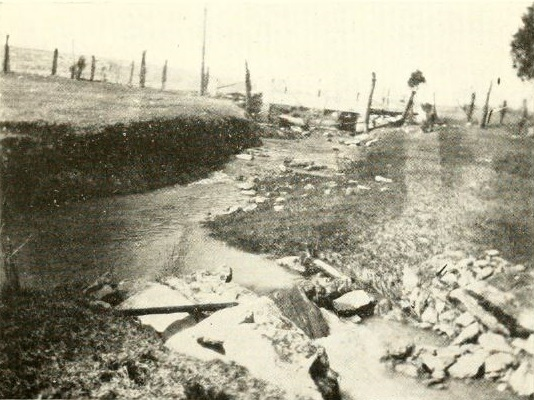
Long Marsh Run, as seen from the back of Villa LaRue around 1920.

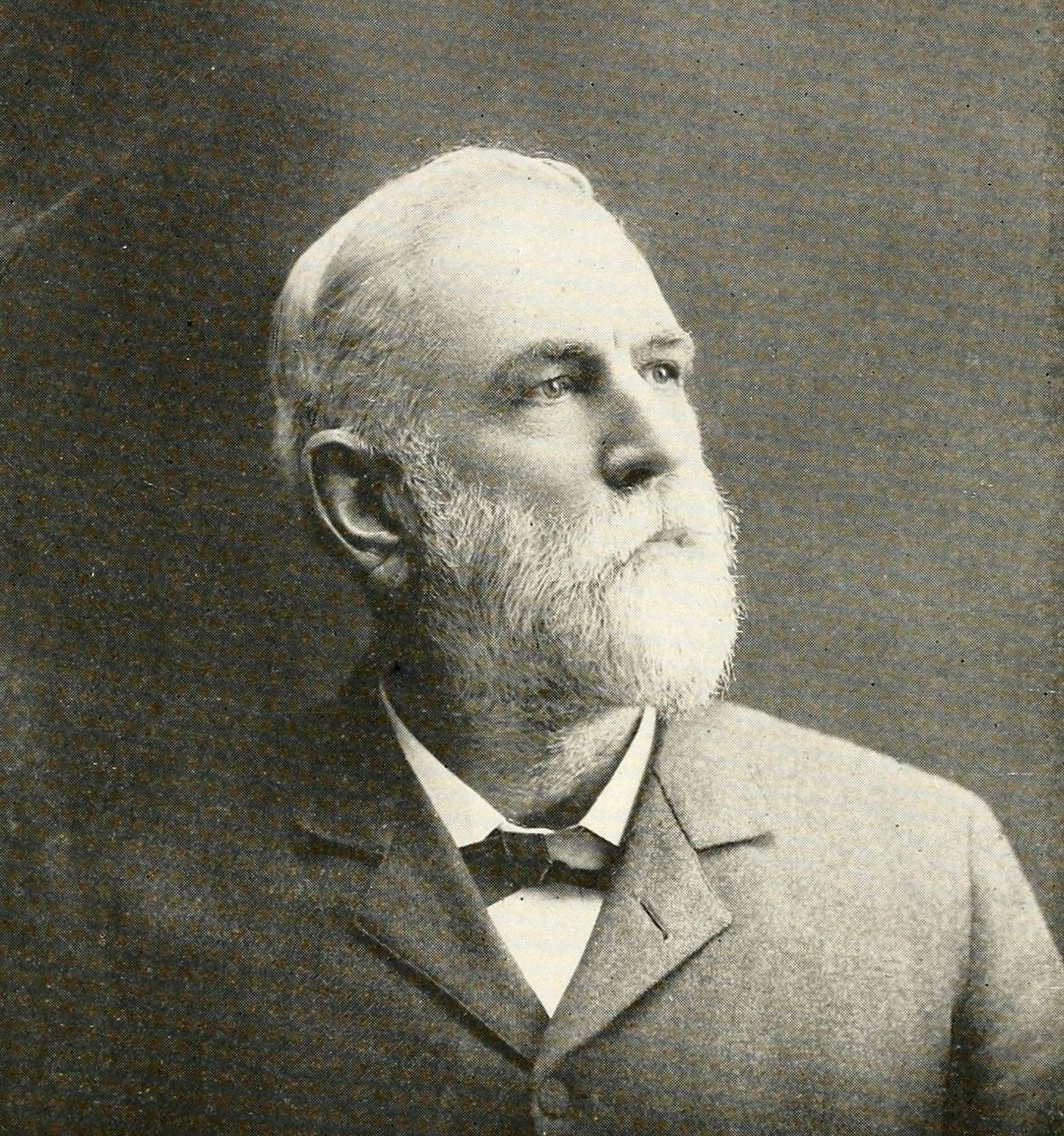
Hugh McElroy LaRue in Sacramento, California, in 1899.

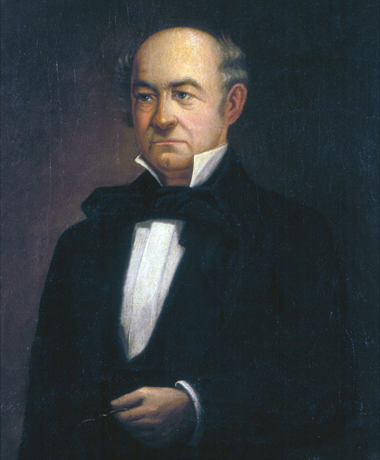
A painting of John LaRue Helm made by his granddaughter Katherine Helm in 1907.

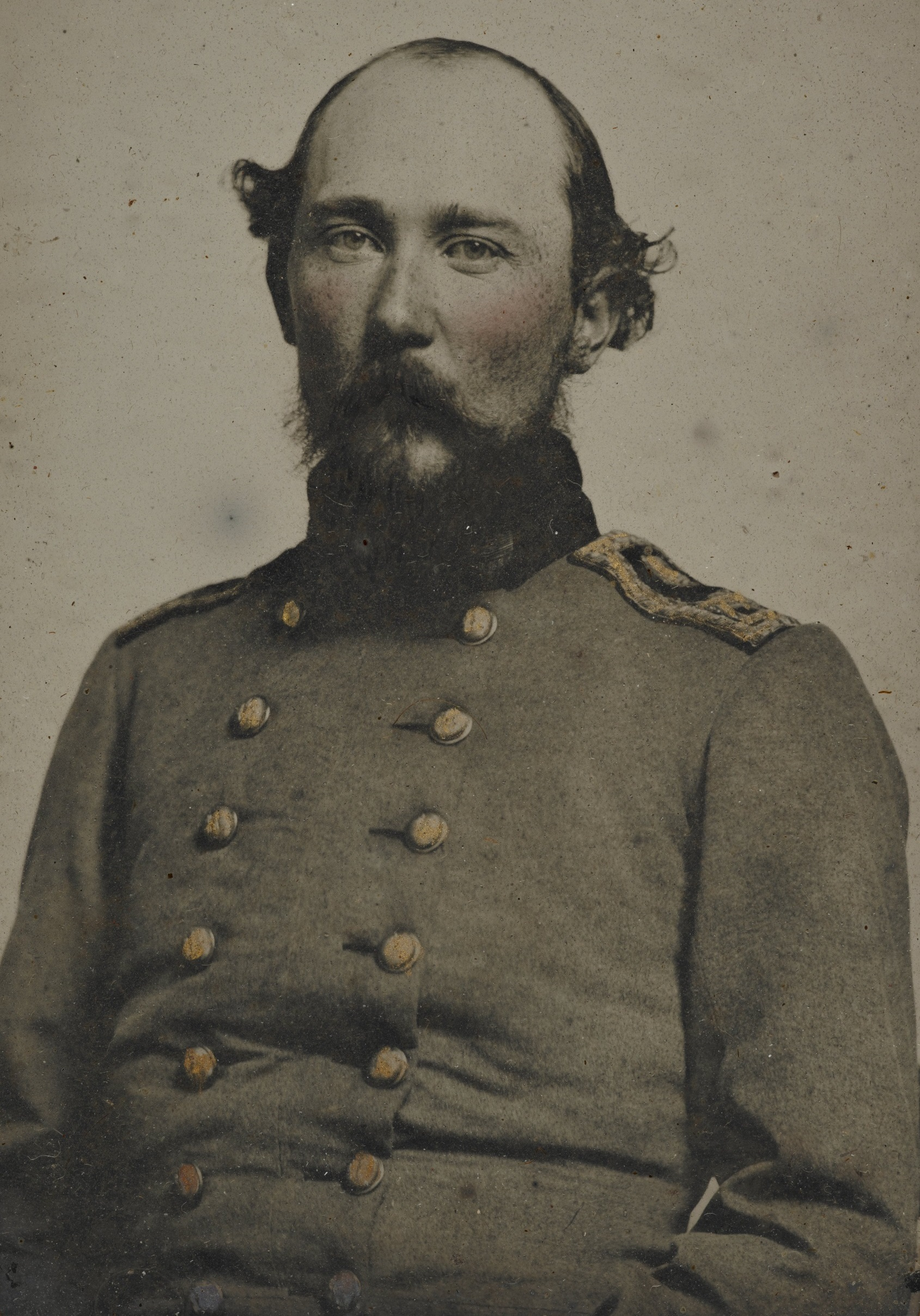
Brigadier General Benjamin Hardin Helm in uniform during the Civil War.

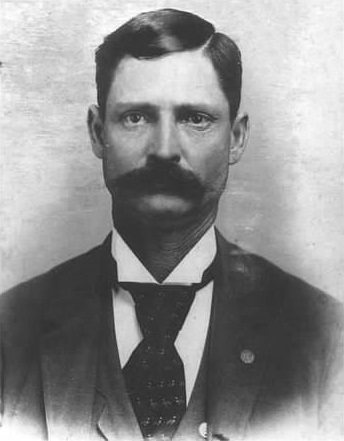
Philip Oscar Hodgen around 1891.

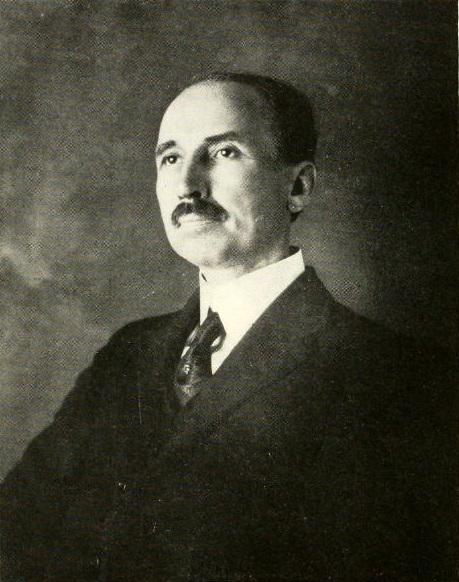
Otis May Mather in April 1921.

== See also ==
- Early life and career of Abraham Lincoln
- Helm Place (Elizabethtown, Kentucky)
- Larue-Layman House
