= Glendale Historic District (Glendale, Kentucky) =

Historic district in Kentucky, United States

- U.S. National Register of Historic Places
- U.S. Historic district
- Location within Kentucky Location within the United States
- Location: Main St. between County Hwy. 1136 and Railroad Ave., Glendale, Kentucky
- Coordinates: 37°36′08″N 85°54′25″W
- Area: 21.5 acres (8.7 ha)
- Architectural style: Colonial Revival, Bungalow/craftsman, Gothic Revival
- MPS: Hardin County MRA
- NRHP reference No.: 88001816
- Added to NRHP: October 4, 1988

The Glendale Historic District in Glendale, Kentucky is a 21.5 acres (8.7 ha) historic district which was listed on the National Register of Historic Places in 1988.

It runs along Main St. between County Highway 1136 and Railroad Ave. It was "a notable collection of late 19th and early 20th century residential, and commercial architecture. The district is significant ... for its architectural character and ...for its role in the commercial history of the county. Few modern buildings have been constructed in the district in recent years and it retains its early 20th century appearance."

It includes 34 contributing buildings. Among those are:

- Stuart Store (c.1905), a two-story frame commercial building with a false front rising to cover an attic
- Glendale Bank (1903), a two-story brick commercial building which is "unusually intact"
