= Chestnut Grove, Buckingham County, Virginia =

Unincorporated community in Virginia, United States

Coordinates: 37°25′13″N 78°36′22″W

Chestnut Grove is an unincorporated community in Buckingham County, in the U.S. state of Virginia.
