= Helm Place (Elizabethtown, Kentucky) =

Historic house in Kentucky, United States

- U.S. National Register of Historic Places
- Location within Kentucky Location within the United States
- Location: Elizabethtown, Kentucky, United States
- Coordinates: 37°42′38″N 85°52′25″W
- Built: 1832
- Architectural style: Greek Revival
- NRHP reference No.: 76000895
- Added to NRHP: 1976

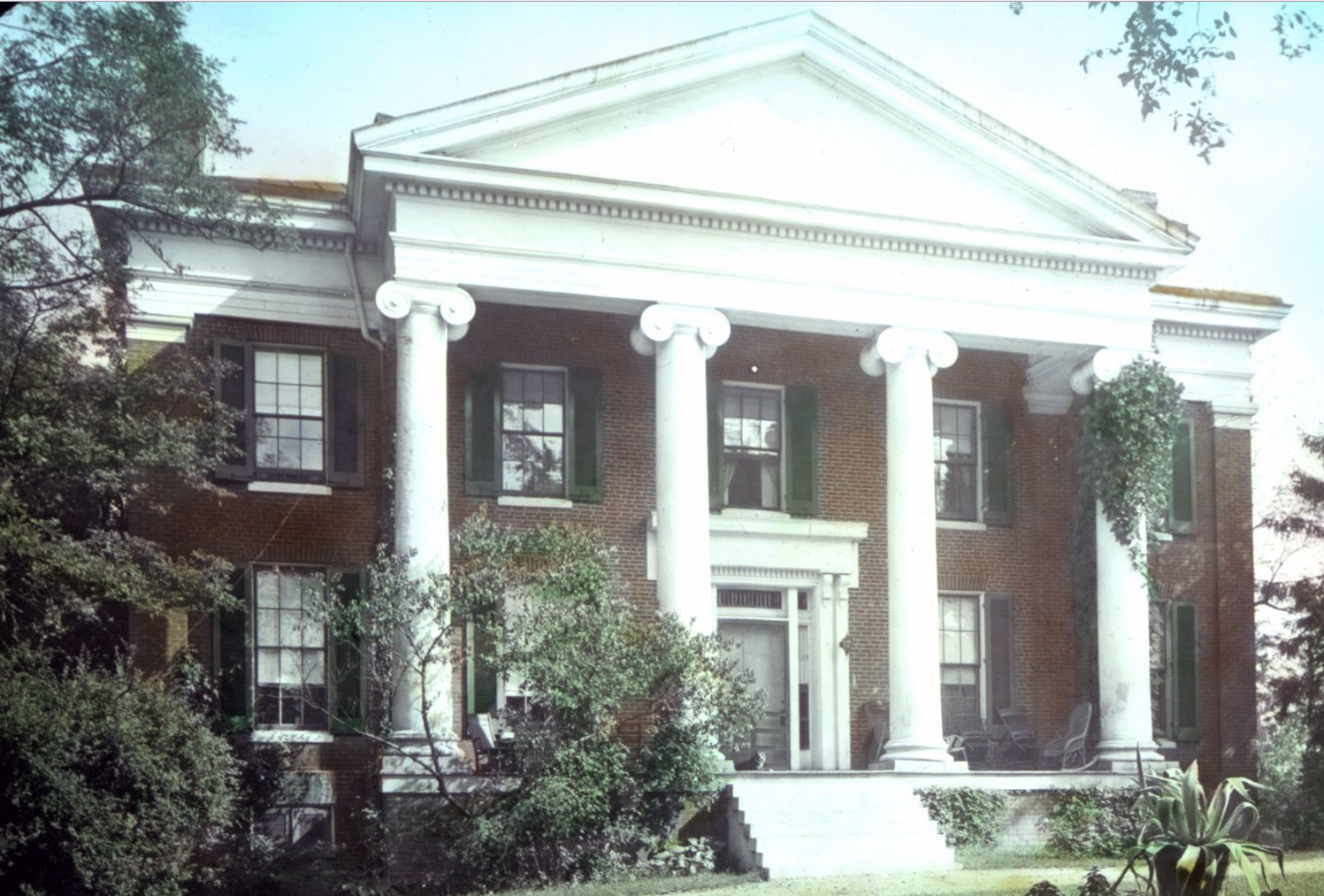
Helm-Place.jpg

Helm Place is a white-columned, brick mansion built by John LaRue Helm in the 1830s, about one and a half miles north of the center of Elizabethtown, Kentucky. It was added to the National Register of Historic Places in 1976.

In 1831, John LaRue Helm purchased the old homestead of his grandfather, Captain Thomas Helm, from his uncle Benjamin. The purchase included his father's home several miles outside of Elizabethtown. John then sold his father's home and some 500 acres to Reverend Charles J. Cecil and the Sisters of Loretto, who used the property to create a girls boarding school known as Bethlehem Academy.

After that, John began construction of a new home called Helm Place on the site of Helm Station, a wooden stockade fort. Helm Station was one of three forts built by Thomas Helm in 1780s in the form of a triangle, each spaced one mile apart, to protect against Indian raids. The settlers built their homes in between the three forts, forming a small community that developed into Elizabethtown in the 1790s.

== See also ==
- LaRue family
- Benjamin Helm House
- Larue-Layman House
- National Register of Historic Places in Hardin County, Kentucky
