= Howe Valley, Kentucky =

Unincorporated community in Kentucky, United States

Howevalley, Kentucky
- Unincorporated community
- Location within Kentucky Location within the United States
- Coordinates: 37°41′14″N 86°05′18″W
- Country: United States
- State: Kentucky
- County: Hardin
- Elevation: 682 ft (208 m)
- Time zone: UTC-5 (Eastern (EST))
  - Summer (DST): UTC-4 (EDT)
- Area codes: 270 & 364
- GNIS feature ID: 494687

Howevalley is an unincorporated community in Hardin County, Kentucky, United States. Howe Valley is located on Kentucky Route 86 12.3 miles (19.8 km) west of Elizabethtown.

A post office operated in the community from 1852 to 1908. Howevalley (also historically spelled Howe's Valley and Howevalley) is situated in a valley of the same name, which in turn was named for John Howe, an early settler. John Howe was in the American Revolutionary War and was given the land for his work.
