= Chestnut Grove, Albemarle County, Virginia =

Unincorporated community in Virginia, United States

Chestnut Grove
- Unincorporated community
- Location within the state of Virginia Chestnut Grove (the United States)
- Coordinates: 38°10′53″N 78°29′04″W
- Country: United States
- State: Virginia
- County: Albemarle
- Time zone: UTC−5 (Eastern (EST))
  - Summer (DST): UTC−4 (EDT)

Chestnut Grove is an unincorporated community in Albemarle County, Virginia, United States.
