= Chestnut Grove, Lancaster County, Virginia =

Unincorporated community in Virginia, United States

Chestnut Grove
- Unincorporated community
- Location in Virginia Location in the United States
- Coordinates: 37°49′20″N 76°26′22″W
- Country: United States
- State: Virginia
- County: Lancaster
- Time zone: UTC−5 (Eastern (EST))
  - Summer (DST): UTC−4 (EDT)

Chestnut Grove is an unincorporated community in Lancaster and Northumberland Counties in the U. S. state of Virginia.
