= Upton, Kentucky =

- City
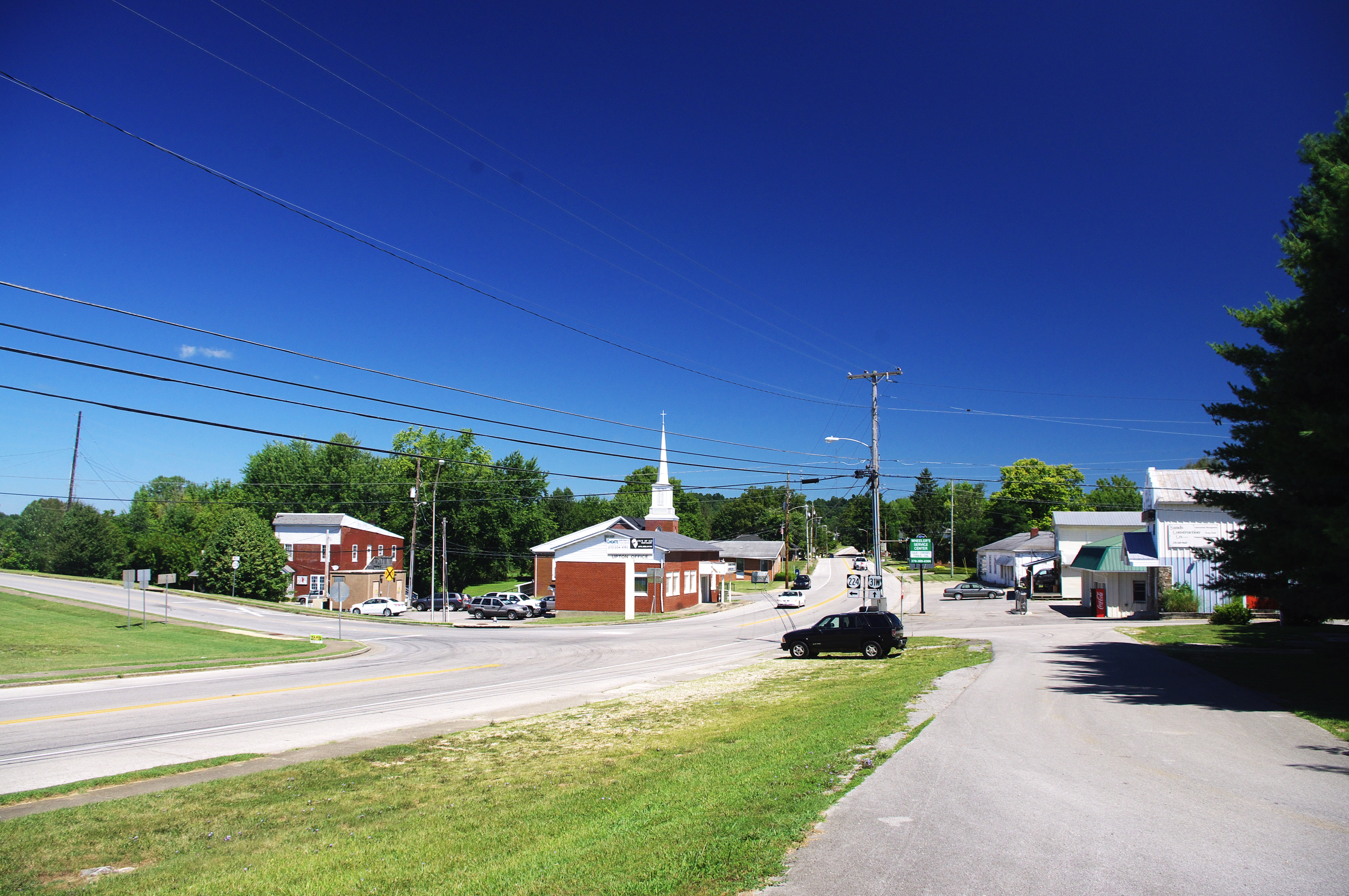
- U.S. Route 31W in Upton

- Location of Upton in Hardin County, Kentucky.
- Coordinates: 37°27′44″N 85°53′43″W
- Country: United States
- State: Kentucky
- Counties: Hardin, LaRue

Area
  - Total: 1.36 sq mi (3.53 km^{2})
  - Land: 1.36 sq mi (3.52 km^{2})
  - Water: 0.0039 sq mi (0.01 km^{2})
- Elevation: 748 ft (228 m)

Population (2020)
  - Total: 704
  - Density: 518.5/sq mi (200.21/km^{2})
- Time zone: UTC-5 (Eastern (EST))
  - Summer (DST): UTC-4 (EDT)
- ZIP code: 42784
- Area codes: 270 & 364
- FIPS code: 21-78672
- GNIS feature ID: 0505924

Upton is a home rule-class city in Hardin and LaRue counties in the U.S. state of Kentucky. The population was 704 as of the 2020 Census, up from 683 from the 2010 census. Its entire area is included in the Elizabethtown–Fort Knox Metropolitan Statistical Area.

== History ==
Upton was founded in 1841, and was initially known as "Leesville." It was renamed in 1856 in honor of George Washington Upton, who had helped develop the area as a stop along the L&N Railroad.

Upton was one of the targets of Confederate John Hunt Morgan during the Civil War. Upton was on the L&N Railroad, one of the key north–south railroads for the Union. The train station and nearby bridges were attacked during the day on December 26, 1862. The Union forces were quickly defeated and Morgan took advantage of the telegraph station in Upton to gather intelligence on Union troop disposition. Morgan then left Upton to destroy bridges at nearby Bacon Creek in Bonnieville and on the Nolin River.

== Geography ==
Upton is located on the Hardin County/LaRue County line at 37°27′44″N 85°53′43″W (37.462175, -85.895335), near the southeast and southwest corners, respectively, of the two counties. U.S. Route 31W passes through the center of the city and follows the county line. The two-lane highway leads north 4 miles (6 km) to Sonora and south 6 miles (10 km) to Bonnieville. Much of Upton is concentrated around the intersection of US 31W and Kentucky Route 224, which runs westward in the direction of Leitchfield. Interstate 65 runs along Upton's eastern boundary, with access from Exit 76. I-65 leads north 17 miles (27 km) to Elizabethtown, the Hardin County seat, and south 24 miles (39 km) to Cave City.

According to the United States Census Bureau, Upton has a total area of 1.4 square miles (3.5 km^{2}), of which 0.004 square miles (0.01 km^{2}), or 0.35%, are water.

== Demographics ==
Historical population
Census	Pop.	Note	%±
1900	125		—
1910	141		12.8%
1920	369		161.7%
1930	402		8.9%
1940	369		−8.2%
1950	383		3.8%
1960	547		42.8%
1970	552		0.9%
1980	731		32.4%
1990	719		−1.6%
2000	654		−9.0%
2010	683		4.4%
2020	704		3.1%
U.S. Decennial Census

As of the census of 2000, there were 654 people, 283 households, and 189 families residing in the city. The population density was 422.9 inhabitants per square mile (163.3/km^{2}). There were 322 housing units at an average density of 208.2 per square mile (80.4/km^{2}). The racial makeup of the city was 96.79% White, 0.76% African American, 0.15% Pacific Islander, 0.15% from other races, and 2.14% from two or more races. Hispanic or Latino of any race were 0.46% of the population.

There were 283 households, out of which 24.7% had children under the age of 18 living with them, 55.1% were married couples living together, 8.8% had a female householder with no husband present, and 32.9% were non-families. 30.4% of all households were made up of individuals, and 16.3% had someone living alone who was 65 years of age or older. The average household size was 2.31 and the average family size was 2.86.

The age distribution was 22.0% under the age of 18, 8.3% from 18 to 24, 27.1% from 25 to 44, 24.0% from 45 to 64, and 18.7% who were 65 years of age or older. The median age was 41 years. For every 100 females, there were 97.0 males. For every 100 females age 18 and over, there were 88.2 males.

The median income for a household in the city was $26,250, and the median income for a family was $31,477. Males had a median income of $26,111 versus $19,375 for females. The per capita income for the city was $13,886. About 8.3% of families and 14.2% of the population were below the poverty line, including 17.5% of those under age 18 and 18.4% of those age 65 or over.
