= Glendale, Kentucky =

Unincorporated community in Kentucky, United States

- Unincorporated community
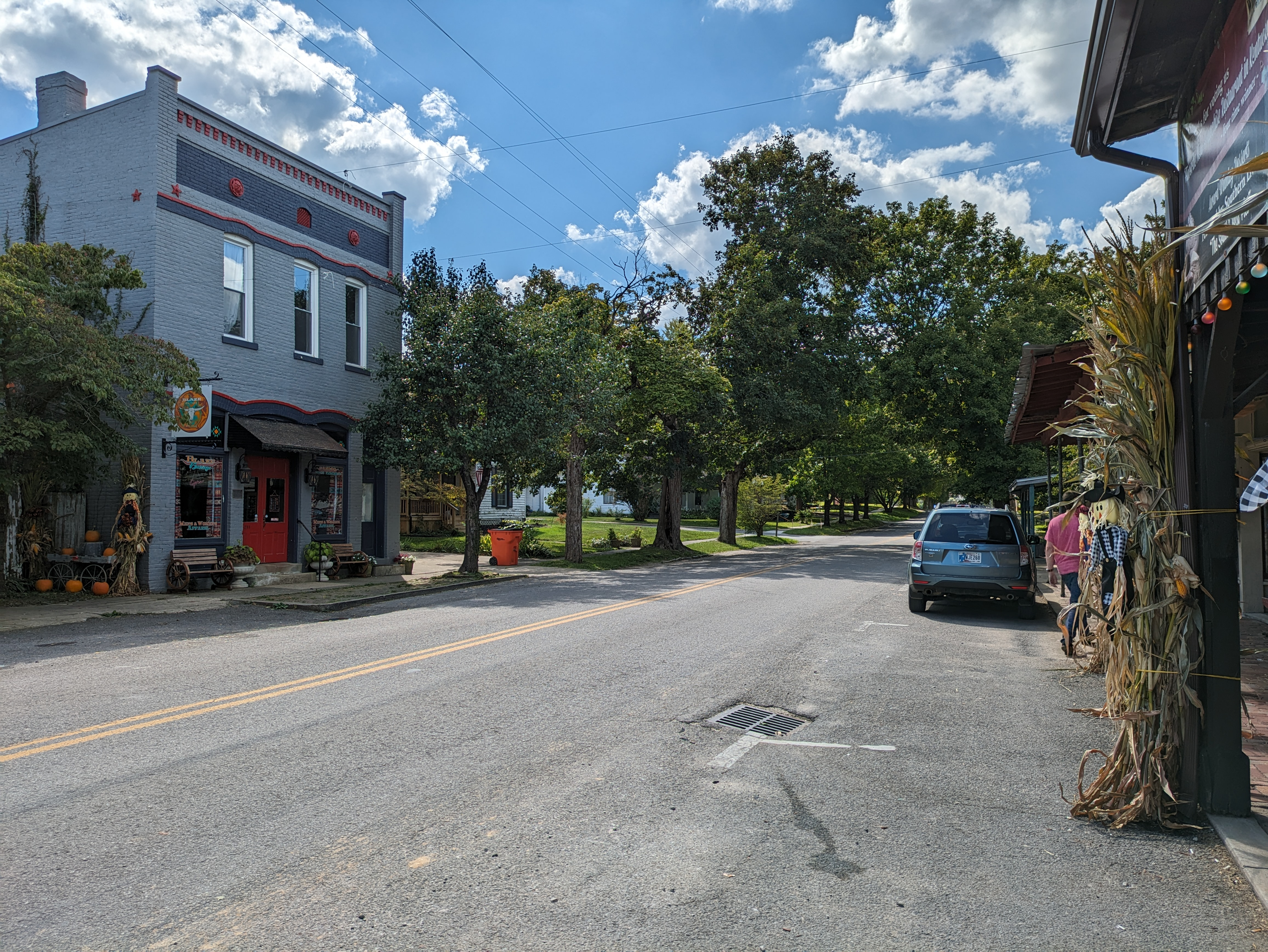
- Main Street

- Location within Kentucky Location within the United States
- Coordinates: 37°36′06″N 85°54′20″W
- Country: United States
- State: Kentucky
- County: Hardin
- Elevation: 705 ft (215 m)
- Time zone: UTC-5 (Eastern (EST))
  - Summer (DST): UTC-4 (EST)
- ZIP code: 42740
- Area codes: 270 & 364
- GNIS feature ID: 492892

Glendale is an unincorporated community in Hardin County, Kentucky, United States. It is included in the Elizabethtown, Kentucky Metropolitan Statistical Area.

== History ==
=== Railroad ===
Once named Walker's Station for Lewis B. Walker's store, when a post office was established on March 2, 1859. Lewis B. Walker was the first postmaster. It was named Glendale for the new train station, which in turn was possibly named for the hometown of a railroad employee. A train depot was built in Glendale along the Louisville and Nashville Railroad tracks in 1864. It was remodeled into a "combination station" in 1905 and the old station became a freight room with two waiting rooms for passengers and an agent's office. The original depot was torn down in the 1930s.

The passage of the train is still a familiar sound and sight in Glendale. Those who grew up in Glendale can remember the train coming through to pick up and drop off mail. As the train passed slowly through town, the person in charge of mail on the train would throw out a large bag of mail for the Glendale postmaster to pick up. For outgoing mail, the Glendale postmaster would hang a mailbag known as a "catcher pouch" on a "mail hook", located next to the train tracks, before the train's scheduled arrival. The catcher pouch was grabbed by a catcher mechanism (mechanical arm) as the train passed by. This was known as "mail on the fly" because the train could deliver and receive mail without stopping.

Legend has it that Jesse James once robbed the Glendale bank.

=== Education ===
Glendale once had a college known as Lynnland. In 1867 a charter was issued under the name of Lynnland Female Institute. The school opened in September of the same year under the guidance of a Baptist preacher, Rev. Colson. After two years of operation, the college was taken over by Confederate Brigadier General William F. Perry. The school was then converted into Lynnland Military Institution which operated until 1879. From 1879 until 1888 it became the residence of the Samuel Sprigg family. In 1888, it reopened as Lynnland Female Institute until it was sold to the Kentucky Baptist Education Society in 1905. In 1915, it became the Kentucky Baptist Children's Home. Many Glendaleans knew it as the Glendale Children's Home until it officially closed in 2009. Many outstanding young men and women came through the Glendale Children's Home where they received loving care by those who lived and worked there. They attended Gilead Baptist Church (organized 1824) which was located nearby. The children also attended school at Glendale Elementary and High School. Glendale became East Hardin Elementary and High School in 1964. East Hardin Elementary was shut down in 1971 as East Hardin High continued to operate. East Hardin High School was converted into East Hardin Middle School in the 1990s, while the high school students would unify with its rival located in Stephensburg (West Hardin High school), in Cecilia, at Central Hardin High School. East Hardin middle school continued to operate until its permanent closure in October 2021. East Hardin Middle school was then relocated to an upgraded school building in Elizabethtown. The Glendale school campus currently sits empty with an undetermined future, as no word has been officially made whether the building will be repurposed, or if it will be torn down.

Amid the school's relocation, the school mascot was also abandoned, and was replaced from the pre existing "Rebels" to "Bruins", due to the controversy it inherited as time progressed. The "Rebels" mascot depicted a Southern civil war era colonel, and was commonly partnered with the adornment of “Rebel flags” in the name of school spirit. As time progressed further beyond the initial mascot adaptation, the rebel flag imagery was outlawed by the school in the mid to late 1990s, despite the persisting mascot identity. The mascot imagery was eventually dropped from being used and only the name itself was kept while anticipating the schools relocation. The Hardin County school system recognized the historical Rebel concept was racially controversial, as it politically aligned itself to carry a negative stigma relative to pro-slavery, pro-racism.

=== Women's rights ===
Glendale was the site of the first organized woman suffrage association in Kentucky. Mary Barr Clay included in her summary of Kentucky women's suffrage activities in the History of Woman Suffrage included a report given in The Revolution from Glendale: "We organized here an association with twenty members the first of October, 1867, and now have fifty. We hope soon to have the whole of Hardin county, and by the close of another year the whole of the State of Kentucky, enlisted on the side of woman's rights."

== Economy ==
In April 2009, Governor Steve Beshear announced that a consortium of least 50 corporations — collectively known as the National Alliance for Advanced Transportation Batteries, or NAATBatt — identified a 1,551-acre (6.28 km^{2}) state-owned industrial site, for a project to bring a lithium-ion battery manufacturing plant for hybrid and electric cars, its headquarters and engineering facilities to Glendale. The project was expected to take 18 months, and potentially employing 1,500-2,000 people.

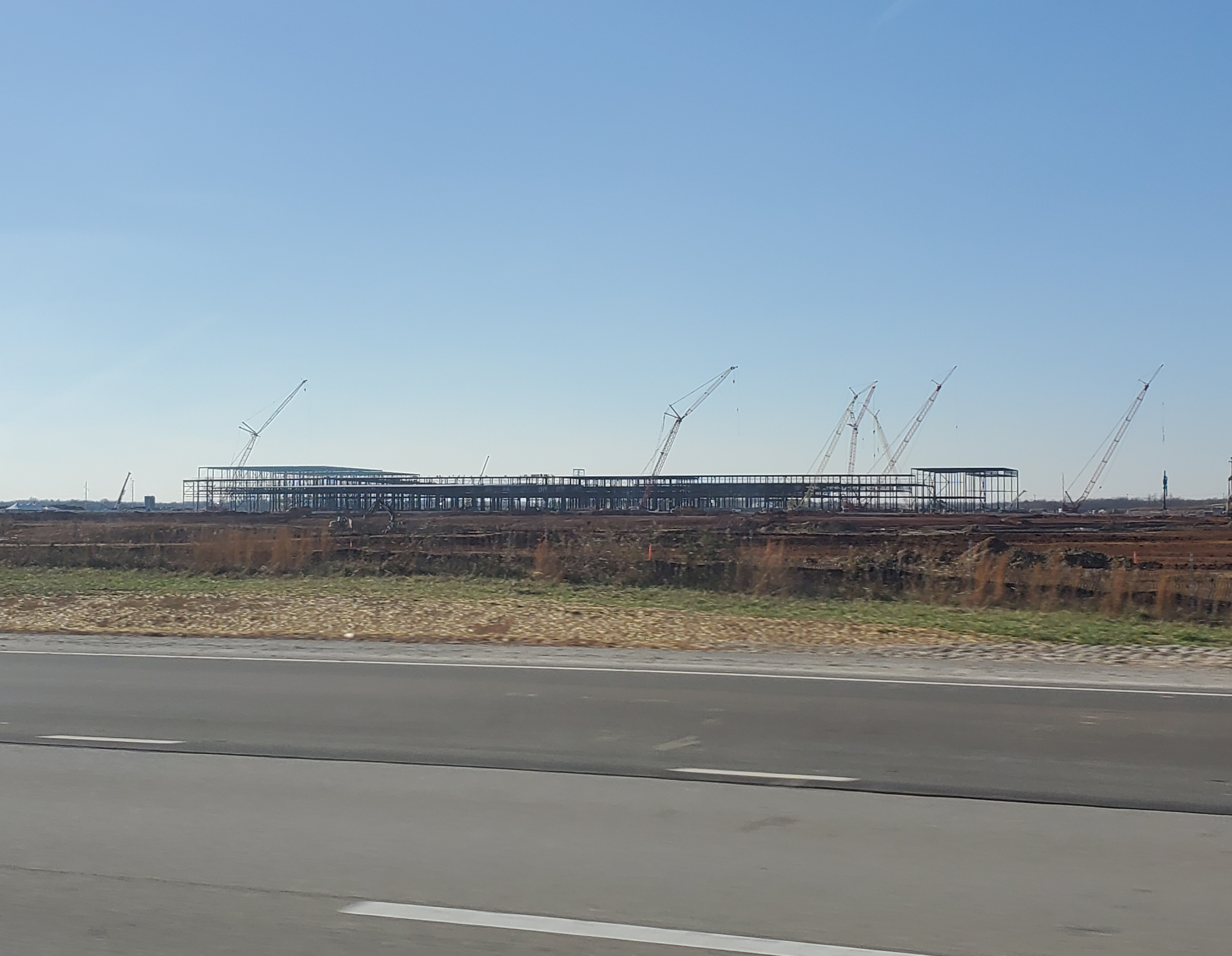
BlueOval SK Battery Park dual gigafactories in Glendale under construction, now known as, Ford Energy Systems

In September 2021, the site was announced as the location of a new Ford battery production facility. BlueOval SK, a joint venture between Ford and Korean company SK Innovation, planned to invest $5.8 billion in a facility tentatively known as BlueOval SK Battery Park, consisting of two large adjacent plants, known as Kentucky 1, and Kentucky 2. The complex was expected to employ about 5,000 at full capacity and would produce batteries to support future Ford and Lincoln electric vehicles. In August 2025, Ford announced the opening of its new EV-Battery facility and the start of its commercial battery production. In December 2025, Ford entered a joint venture disposition agreement with Korean SK On, dividing the BlueOval SK plants, and pivoting to BESS (battery energy storage system).

=== Ford Energy Systems ===
In December 2025, Ford announced major plans to repurpose the Kentucky 1 plant into a dedicated hub for manufacturing battery energy storage systems, creating a new Ford business, Ford Energy, which will invest $2 billion to retool the facility. After temporary layoffs of 1,500 to 1,600 workers, they plan to employ over 2,000 people when the repurposed plant opens in late 2027. Currently, the Kentucky 2 plant is idle, Gov. Beshear hinted at the possibility of the second site also being turned into an energy storage system production facility as well.

== Transportation ==
In April 2024, the completion of the new $35+ million Exit 86 interchange on I-65 in Glendale was announced, which includes a new overpass, new interstate ramps as well as two new intersections, one in Kentucky 222 and the other at US 31 West (S Dixie Hwy), as well as a new entrance road at the newly renamed Ford Energy Systems plant site. The project also reconstructed, and realigned about a mile of Kentucky 222 from two lanes to four lanes spanning the I-65 interchange.

== Climate ==
The climate in this area is characterized by hot, humid summers and generally mild to cool winters. According to the Köppen Climate Classification system, Glendale has a humid subtropical climate, abbreviated "Cfa" on climate maps.

== Cultural events and food ==
Glendale is host to the annual Glendale Crossing Festival on the third Saturday of October. The festival is well known for the wide variety of antiques and crafts for sale.

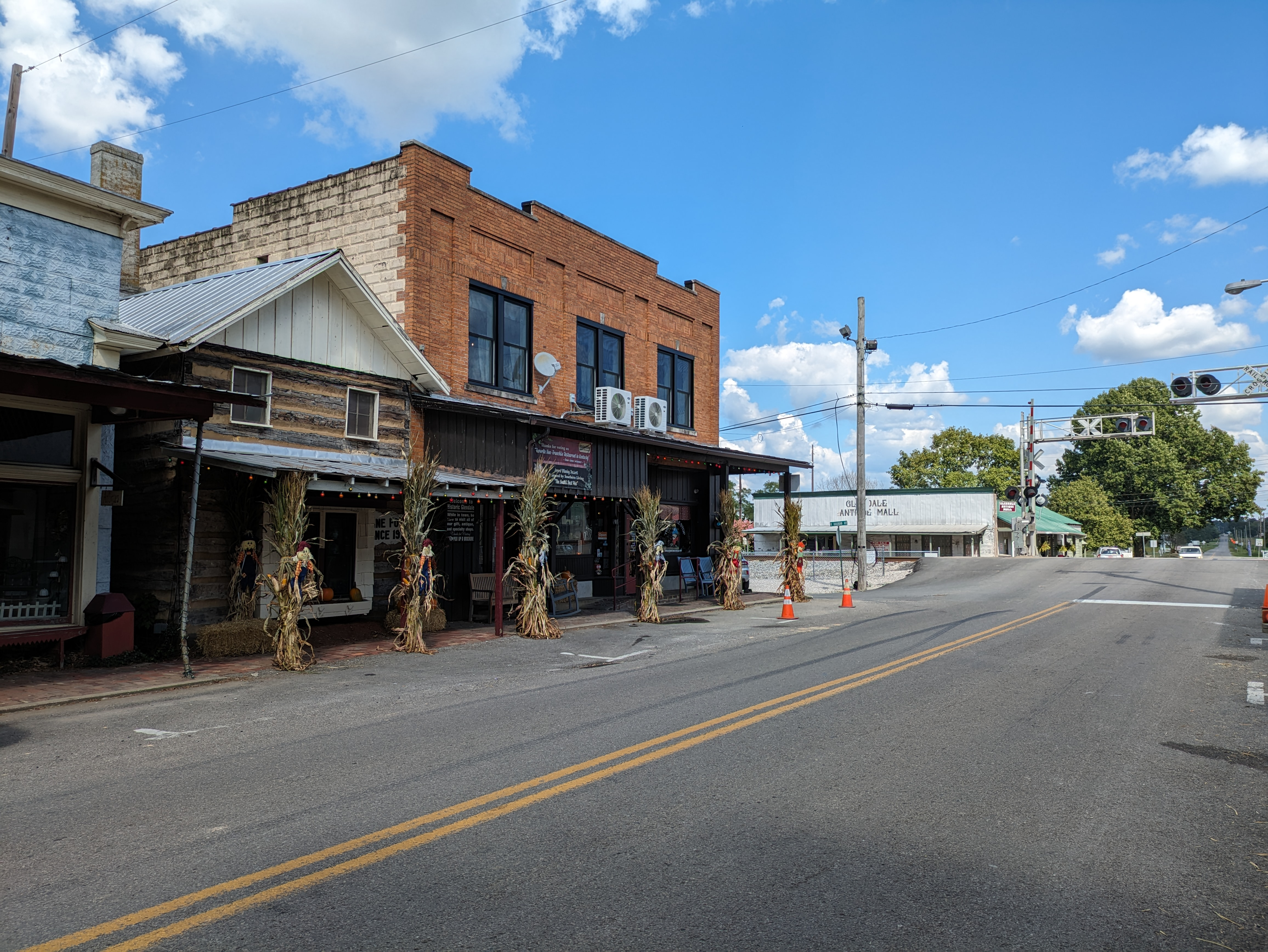
The Whistle Stop restaurant

The Whistle Stop restaurant in Glendale is situated along the railroad, and has infamously earned itself notoriety for the southern-style cuisine it has served since its establishment. The Whistle Stop was created from expanding a lunch business within the former hardware store it resides within. The owners, James and Idell Sego, opened and operated the restaurant from 1975 to 2005. From 2005 to 2021 the restaurant was owned by Mike and Lynn Cummins. 2021–present day the restaurant is owned and operated by Mike Franz. The restaurants traditional style has remained unchanged since its inception.

Glendale has a special zoning regulation that keeps out businesses such as fast-food restaurant chains from its core downtown business area, despite allowing a large corporate chain convenience store to take residence.

Glendale is located approximately 50 miles (80 km) from one of the most popular tourist attractions in the Commonwealth of Kentucky, Mammoth Cave National Park.
