= Aluminaut =

First aluminum-hulled submarine

Coordinates: 37.563007°N 77.466413°W

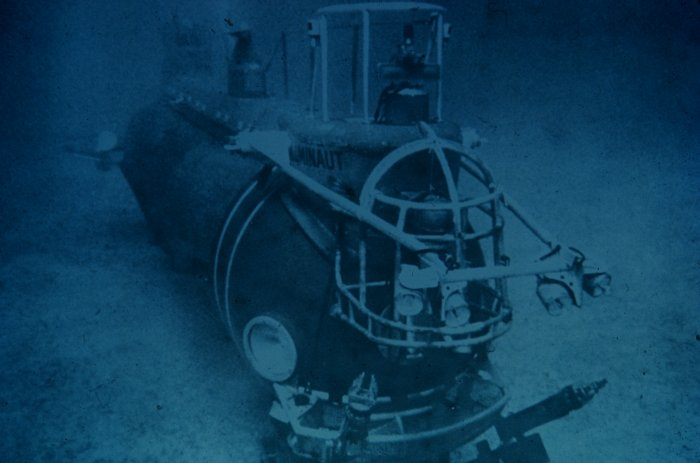
- Aluminaut underwater in 1972 (NOAA/NURP)

History

United States
- Name: Aluminaut
- Owner: Reynolds Metals Company
- Operator: Reynolds Marine Services
- Builder: General Dynamics Electric Boat, Groton, Connecticut, US
- Launched: 1964
- In service: 1964
- Out of service: 1970
- Home port: Miami, Florida, US
- Status: Preserved as museum ship; Science Museum of Virginia; Richmond, Virginia, US

General characteristics
- Type: Deep-submergence vehicle (DSV)
- Tonnage: 80 short tons (73 t)
- Displacement: 80 short tons (73 t)
- Length: 51 ft (16 m)
- Beam: 8 ft 1 in (2.46 m)
- Speed: 3 knots (5.6 km/h; 3.5 mph)
- Endurance: 32 hours
- Test depth: 17,000 feet (5,200 m)
- Capacity: 6,000 lb (2,700 kg) payload
- Crew: 6-7 (3 crew, 3-4 scientists)

Aluminaut (built in 1964) was the world's first aluminum submarine. An experimental vessel, the 80-ton, 15.5-metre (51 ft) crewed deep-ocean research submersible was built by Reynolds Metals Company, which was seeking to promote the utility of aluminum. Aluminaut was based in Miami, Florida, and was operated from 1964 to 1970 by Reynolds Submarine Services, doing contract work for the U.S. Navy and other organizations, including marine biologist Jacques Cousteau.

Aluminaut is best known for helping recover a lost unarmed U.S. hydrogen bomb in 1966 and recovering its smaller fellow deep-submergence vehicle, DSV Alvin in 1969, after Alvin had been lost amid rough seas in the Atlantic Ocean the previous year. After retirement, Aluminaut was donated to the Science Museum of Virginia in Richmond, where it is on permanent display.

== 1964: World's first aluminium submarine ==
Reynolds Metals was an early developer and manufacturer of aluminium products, including aluminium buses and other aluminium motor vehicles.

Reynolds Metals designed and built the Aluminaut as an experiment. The concept of an aluminum submarine was developed at Reynolds during World War II in 1942 by executive vice president Julian "Louis" Reynolds, a son of the founder. Louis Reynolds led the foil division, which accounted for 65% of the company's sales before the war. Reynolds Metals also played an active role in the U.S. war effort.

In 1964, Reynolds had the Electric Boat Division of General Dynamics in Groton, Connecticut, build the world's first aluminum submarine. The submersible was operated by subsidiary Reynolds Submarine Services Corporation, based in Miami, Florida. Compared to many deep-sea vessels, Aluminaut was large. It weighed 80 tons and could accommodate a crew of three and three to four scientists. It had four view ports, active and passive sonar, manipulators, side-scan sonar, and a capacity of 6,000 pounds (2,700 kg) of payload.

For flexibility, it was outfitted for many types of oceanographic and salvage missions. In September 1964, Time magazine reported on the vehicle's unique specifications, stating that its 51-foot (16 m) hull consists of 11 forged cylinders. Aluminum's strength-to-weight ratio exceeds that of steel, so Aluminaut's 6.5-inch-thick (170 mm) shell could withstand pressures of 7,500 pounds per square inch (52 MPa) at the sub's 17,000 ft (5,200 m) maximum diving range.

The Aluminaut was designed at the Woods Hole Oceanographic Institution in Woods Hole, Massachusetts. A full-scale wooden mock-up was built to engineer the interior spaces. The project was classified as top-secret at that time. At that time it did not have a conning tower entry and it immediately flooded and sank. The tower entry was designed and added and in the first test, the submarine turned upside down. It was thought at that time that the design was impractical and was almost scrapped.

A one-sixteenth scale model of the final design was built in 1960 and run through stability and pressure tests.

== 1966: Helping recover a lost unarmed atomic bomb ==
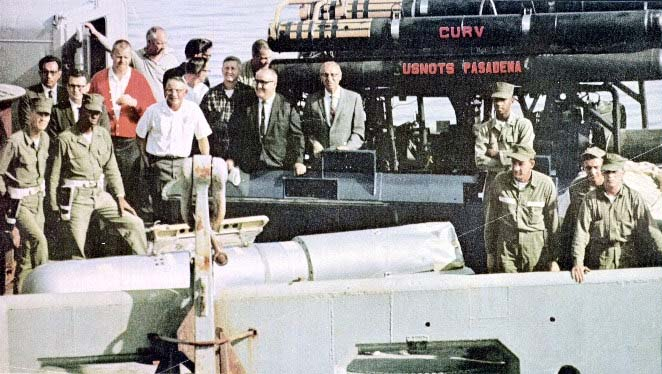
The recovered B28FI thermonuclear bomb was displayed by U.S. Navy officials on the fantail of the submarine rescue ship U.S.S. Petrel after it was located in the Mediterranean Sea off the coast of Spain at a depth of 762 meters and recovered in April 1966

The Aluminaut soon became useful during an incident with potentially major implications. On January 17, 1966, a 1.45-megaton-of-TNT equivalent thermonuclear bomb (Teller–Ulam design) was lost in the Mediterranean Sea during a United States Air Force collision over Palomares, Spain.

Seven crew members were killed in the mid-air crash of a B-52 bomber and a KC-135 refueling plane. The crash dropped three thermonuclear bombs on the land, and one in the sea. Although the others were quickly located, the bomb which had fallen into the ocean could not be located promptly.

The U.S. Navy responded to the coast off Spain with an 18-ship, 2,200-man recovery task force under Admiral William S. "Wild Bill" Guest. In addition to military ships, the civilian-crewed Aluminaut and deep-sea submersible Alvin were both used to respond to this urgent situation as part of the task force, along with other specialized equipment. Once on site, Aluminaut and Alvin searched the ocean depths to locate and recover the submerged bomb. For eighty days the search went on, straining the U.S. relationship with Spain, and giving Soviet propagandists what Time magazine described as "a rich fallout of anti-American gibes".

The bomb was found by Alvin resting nearly 910 metres (3,000 ft) below the surface, and was raised intact on April 7, 1966. Admiral Guest allowed it to be photographed by the news media, allowing the world at large its first peek at a thermonuclear bomb as it sat secured on the fantail of the 2,100-long-ton (2,100 t) submarine rescue ship USS Petrel.

== 1969: Rescuing DSV Alvin ==
Although both were put into service in 1964, the smaller Alvin was to have a much longer life. As of 2026, the Alvin is still in active service, operated by the Woods Hole Oceanographic Institution. Yet Aluminaut proved vital to Alvin in 1969.

In October 1968, Alvin was being transported aboard the Woods Hole Oceanographic Institution tender ship Lulu. Lulu was a vessel created from a pair of decommissioned U.S. Navy pontoon boats with a support structure. While Alvin was being lowered over the side of Lulu on October 16, 1968, two steel cables snapped with three crew members aboard and the hatch open. Situated between the pontoons with no deck underneath, Alvin entered the water and rapidly began to sink. The three crew members managed to escape, but Alvin sank in 1,500 metres (4,900 ft) of water.

In September 1969, Aluminaut was used to secure lines and a net to the Alvin, which was located, intact, almost a mile beneath the surface. Alvin was then hauled to the surface by USS Mizar. Lunches left aboard Alvin were found to be soggy but edible, a fact which was tested when a preserved cheese sandwich was nibbled upon by one of the crew. This incident led to a more comprehensive understanding that near-freezing temperatures and the lack of decaying oxygen at depth aided preservation. Alvin required a major overhaul after the incident.

== Other missions ==
Aluminaut did other work for the U.S. Navy, recovering a 2,100-pound (950 kg) current array torpedo at the Navy's acoustic testing facility in the Bahamas. It helped make films for Jacques Cousteau and Ivan Tors Studios. Depths up to 6,000 feet (1,800 m) were reached while surveying for the U.S. Naval Oceanographic Office.

== Retirement ==
The Aluminaut was retired in 1970. It was donated by Reynolds Metals Company to the Science Museum of Virginia in Richmond, Virginia, where it is on display at the Garner Pavilion. However, the submersible continues to be maintained in case it needs to be returned to active service.

== See also ==
- Black smoker – Fissure in a planet's surface from which heated water emits
- Hydrothermal vent – Fissure in a planet's surface from which heated water emits
- Mid-ocean ridge – Basaltic underwater mountain system formed by plate tectonic spreading
