= Carl Brashear =

One of the first African Americans to become a U.S. Navy Master Diver

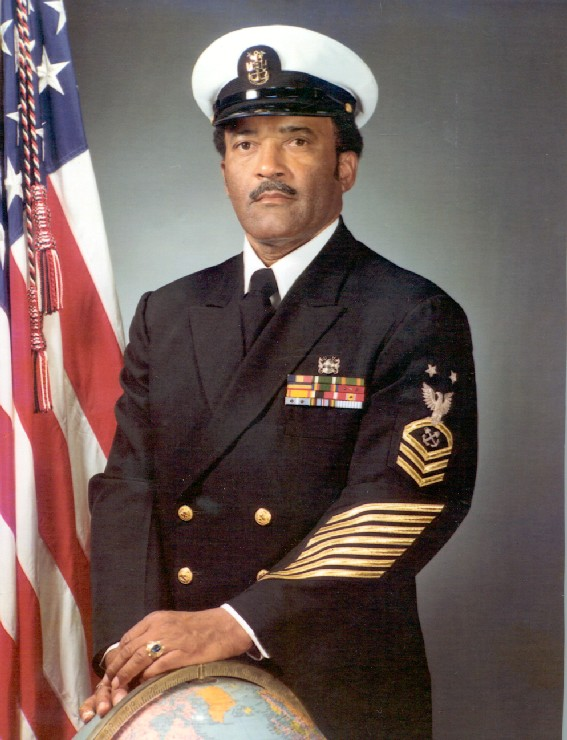
- Brashear as a Master Chief Petty Officer, c. 1970s
- Born: Carl Maxie Brashear; 19 January 1931; Tonieville, Kentucky, U.S.
- Died: 25 July 2006 (aged 75); Portsmouth, Virginia, U.S.
- Military career
- Allegiance: United States
- Branch: United States Navy
- Service years: 1948–1979
- Rank: Master Chief Petty Officer
- Conflicts: Korean War
- Awards: Navy and Marine Corps Medal; Navy and Marine Corps Commendation Medal; Navy and Marine Corps Achievement Medal

Carl Maxie Brashear (19 January 1931 – 25 July 2006) was an American sailor who served in the United States Navy as a Master Diver. He was among the first African-Americans to obtain that qualification, doing so in 1970 despite the amputation of his lower left leg in 1966. The 2000 film Men of Honor was based on his life.

== Early life and education ==
Brashear was born on 19 January 1931, in Tonieville, LaRue County, Kentucky, the sixth of 16 children to sharecroppers McDonald and Gonzella Brashear. In 1935, the family settled on a farm in Sonora, Kentucky. Brashear attended Sonora Grade School from 1937 to 1946.

== Career ==
Brashear enlisted in the United States Navy on 25 February 1948, four months before the military was desegregated by President Harry S. Truman. He graduated from the United States Navy Diving & Salvage School in 1954, becoming the first African-American to attend and graduate from the Diving & Salvage School and one of the first African-American United States Navy Divers.

While attending diving school in Bayonne, New Jersey, Brashear faced hostility and racism. He found notes on his bunk saying, "We're going to drown you today, nigger!" and "We don't want any nigger divers." Brashear received encouragement to finish from Boatswain's Mate First Class Harry M. Rutherford, and graduated 16 out of 17.

Brashear first worked as a diver retrieving approximately 16,000 rounds of ammunition that fell off a barge which had broken in half and sunk. On his first tour of shore duty in Quonset Point, Rhode Island, his duties included the salvaging of airplanes (including one Blue Angel) and recovering multiple dead bodies from the sea.

Brashear was assigned to escort the presidential yacht the Barbara Anne to Rhode Island. He met President Eisenhower and received a small knife that said, "To Carl M. Brashear. From Dwight D. Eisenhower, 1957. Many, many thanks." After making Chief Petty Officer in 1959, he stayed at Guam for three years doing mostly demolition dives.

=== Leg amputation and recovery ===
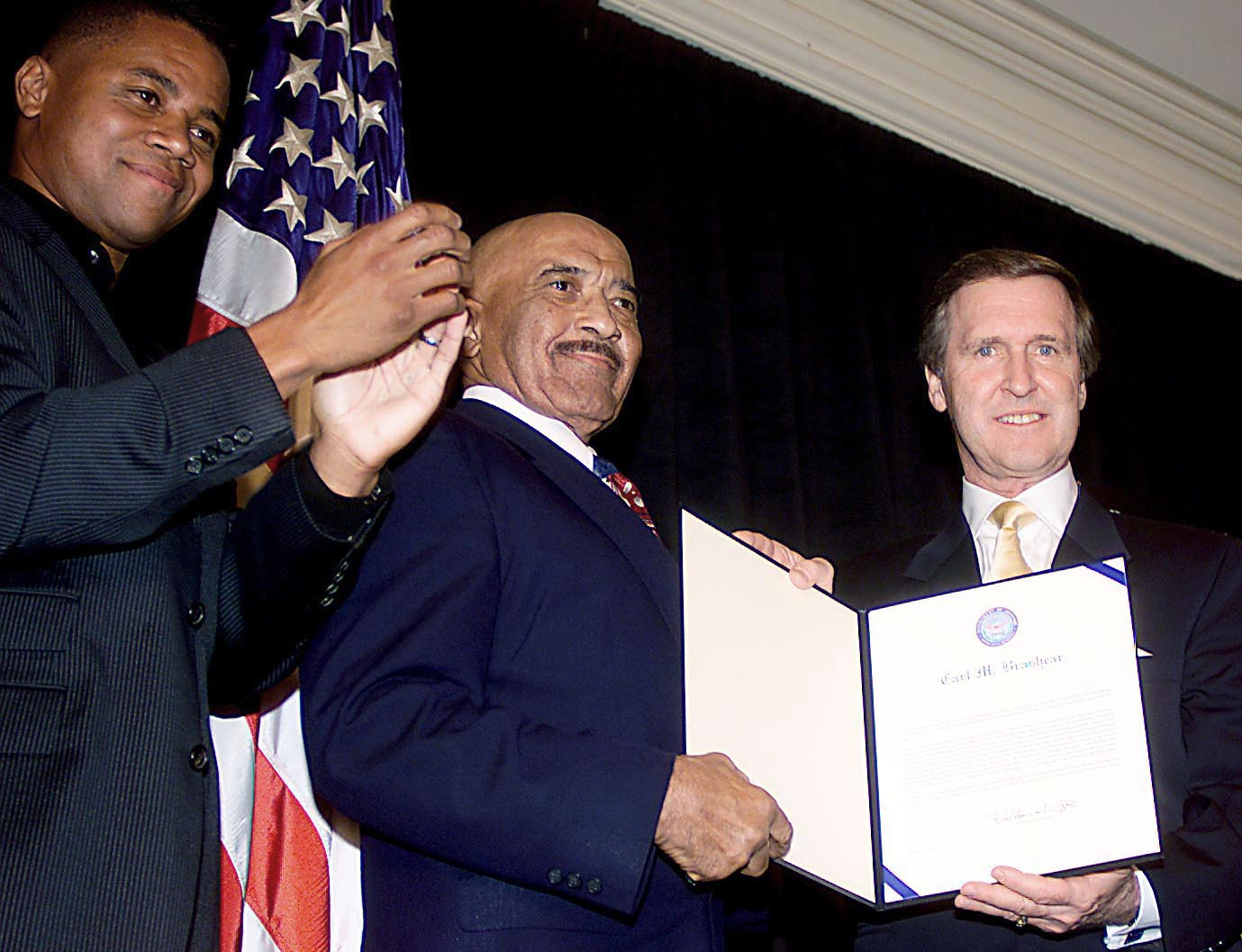
Brashear (center) received an Outstanding Public Service Award in October 2000 from actor Cuba Gooding Jr. and then-Defense Secretary William Cohen for 42 years of combined military and federal civilian service. Gooding portrayed Brashear in the 2000 film Men of Honor

In January 1966, in an accident now known as the Palomares incident, a B28 nuclear bomb was lost off the coast of Palomares, Spain, after two United States Air Force aircraft of the Strategic Air Command (SAC), a B-52G Stratofortress bomber and a KC-135A Stratotanker aerial refueling aircraft, collided during aerial refueling. Brashear was serving aboard USS Hoist (ARS-40) when it was dispatched to find and recover the missing bomb for the Air Force. The warhead was found after two and a half months of searching. For his service in helping to retrieve the bomb, Brashear was later awarded the Navy and Marine Corps Medal, the highest navy award for non-combat heroism.

During the bomb recovery operations on 23 March 1966, a lifting cable snapped, causing a pipe to swing across the deck of the USS Hoist. Brashear darted to push a shipmate out of the object's path. It consequently struck Brashear's left leg below the knee, nearly shearing it off. The impact flipped him in the air, almost casting him overboard before he landed on the deck. He was evacuated to Torrejon Air Base in Spain, then to the USAF Hospital at Wiesbaden Air Base, Germany; and finally to the Naval Hospital in Portsmouth, Virginia. Beset with persistent infection and necrosis, his lower left leg was eventually amputated.

Brashear remained at the Naval Regional Medical Center in Portsmouth from May 1966 until March 1967 recovering and rehabilitating from the amputation. From March 1967 to March 1968, Brashear was assigned to the Harbor Clearance Unit Two, Diving School, preparing for return to full active duty and diving. In April 1968, after a long struggle, Brashear was the first amputee diver to be recertified as a United States Navy diver. In 1970, he became possibly the first African-American master diver, (debated between him and John Henry Turpin) and served nine more years beyond that, achieving the rating of master chief boatswain's mate in 1971. Brashear was motivated by his beliefs that "It's not a sin to get knocked down; it's a sin to stay down" and "I ain't going to let nobody steal my dream."

=== Retirement ===
Brashear retired from the United States Navy on 1 April 1979, as a Master Chief Petty Officer (E-9) and master diver. He then served as a civilian employee for the government at Naval Station Norfolk, Norfolk, Virginia, and retired in 1993 with the grade of GS-11.

== Personal life ==
Brashear married and divorced three times: Junetta Wilcoxson (1952–1978), Hattie R. Elam (1980–1983), and Jeanette A. Brundage (1985–1987). He had four children: Shazanta (1955–1996), DaWayne, Phillip, and Patrick. Brashear's grand-nephew is a retired professional ice hockey player Donald Brashear.

Brashear died of respiratory and heart failure at the Naval Medical Center Portsmouth, Portsmouth, Virginia, on 25 July 2006. He is buried at Woodlawn Memorial Gardens in Norfolk, Virginia.

After his death, his sons DaWayne and Phillip Brashear started the Carl Brashear Foundation in his honor.

== Decorations and awards ==
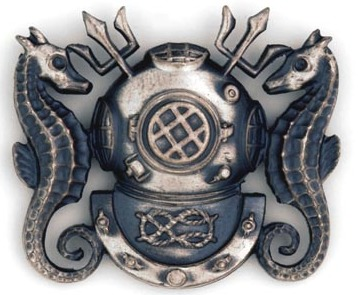

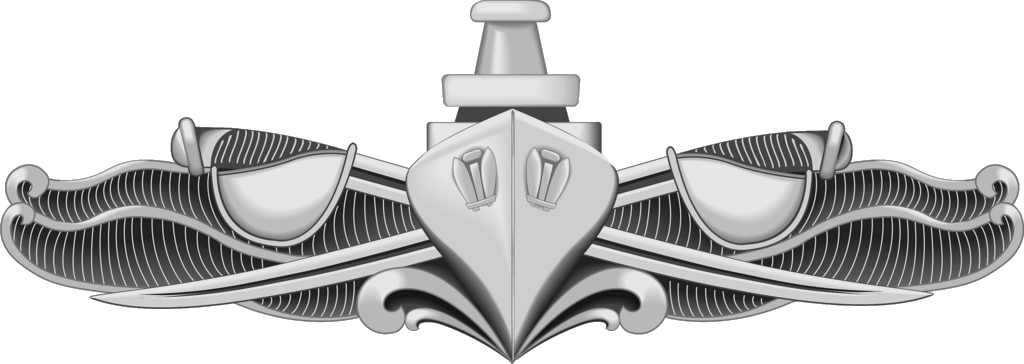

Navy Master Diver Badge
Navy and Marine Corps Medal		Navy and Marine Corps Commendation Medal
Navy and Marine Corps Achievement Medal	Navy and Marine Corps Presidential Unit Citation	Navy Unit Commendation
Secretary of Defense Medal for Outstanding Public Service	Navy Good Conduct Medal (8 awards)	China Service Medal
Navy Occupation Service Medal	National Defense Service Medal with one bronze service star	Korean Service Medal with two service stars
Armed Forces Expeditionary Medal	United Nations Korea Medal	Korean War Service Medal
Enlisted Surface Warfare Specialist insignia

- 8 gold service stripes.

=== Navy and Marine Corps Medal citation ===
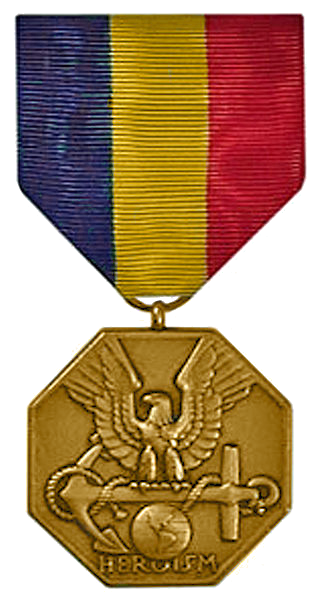

The President of the United States of America takes pleasure in presenting the Navy and Marine Corps Medal to Chief Boatswain's Mate Carl Maxie Brashear, United States Navy, for heroism while serving aboard U.S.S. HOIST (ARS-40), which was operating in support of Task Force 65 on 23 March 1966, in connection with salvage operations of great importance to the United States. While engaged in transferring stores from a landing craft to HOIST in heavy seas off the coast of Spain, Chief Brashear saw the bowline of the landing craft part. Realizing that a shipmate standing in the stern of the landing craft was in serious jeopardy if the heavily strained stern line also parted, he unhesitatingly pushed his shipmate to safety, but was seriously injured himself when the stress from the remaining line caused a portion of the craft to carry away and hit him in the leg. By his prompt and courageous actions in saving another man from injury or possible death, Chief Brashear, at the risk of his own life, upheld the highest traditions of the United States Naval Service.

== Honors ==
Brashear was honored with the Secretary of Defense Medal for Outstanding Public Service in October 2000 for 42 years of combined military and federal civilian service. The award was presented by Secretary of Defense William Cohen.

On 24 October 2007, the Newport News Fire Department dedicated a 33-foot (10 m) high-speed fireboat named Carl Brashear to be used by their Dive and Marine Incident Response Teams.

The Lewis and Clark-class dry cargo ship USNS Carl Brashear (T-AKE-7) was christened in his honor in San Diego, California, on 18 September 2008. General Dynamics delivered the completed ship to the Navy on 4 March 2009.

On 21 February 2009, Nauticus, a science and maritime museum in downtown Norfolk, Virginia, opened a new exhibit called "Dream to Dive: The Life of Master Diver Carl Brashear." It is the first full-scale museum exhibit dedicated to Brashear.

In 2009 the Chief Petty Officer Club onboard Naval Station Little Creek VA was renamed The Carl Brashear Center. Carl's son and several friends gave speeches at and attended the renaming ceremony. Carl was known to frequent the CPO Club onboard Little Creek up until the time of his death.

On 9 November 2017, the Commonwealth of Kentucky dedicated the "Carl M. Brashear Radcliff Veterans Center" in honor of BMCM (MDV) Carl Brashear. Construction on the new center, which is located about 30 miles from Brashear's hometown of Sonora, was completed about a year before the dedication ceremony. On hand was his son Phillip, Founder of the Brashear Foundation, Kentucky Lt. Gov. Jenean Hampton, Veterans Center Administrator Israel Ray, members of the Brashear family, along with members of the Combat Veterans Motorcycle Association who nominated and worked to collect over 7,000 signatures in support of naming the center after Brashear.

On 25 July 2018, Lincoln Parkway bridge, just outside Tonieville, KY was renamed the "Master Chief Petty Officer Carl Maxie Brashear Memorial Bridge."

Brashear's Dress Uniform is on display at the Hardin County History Museum in Elizabethtown, Kentucky as part of the "We Were There" Military Tribute and Exhibit.

Oris SA released the Oris Carl Brashear Cal. 401 Limited Edition dive watch to commemorate Brashear.
