= USNS Carl Brashear =

Cargo ship of the United States Navy

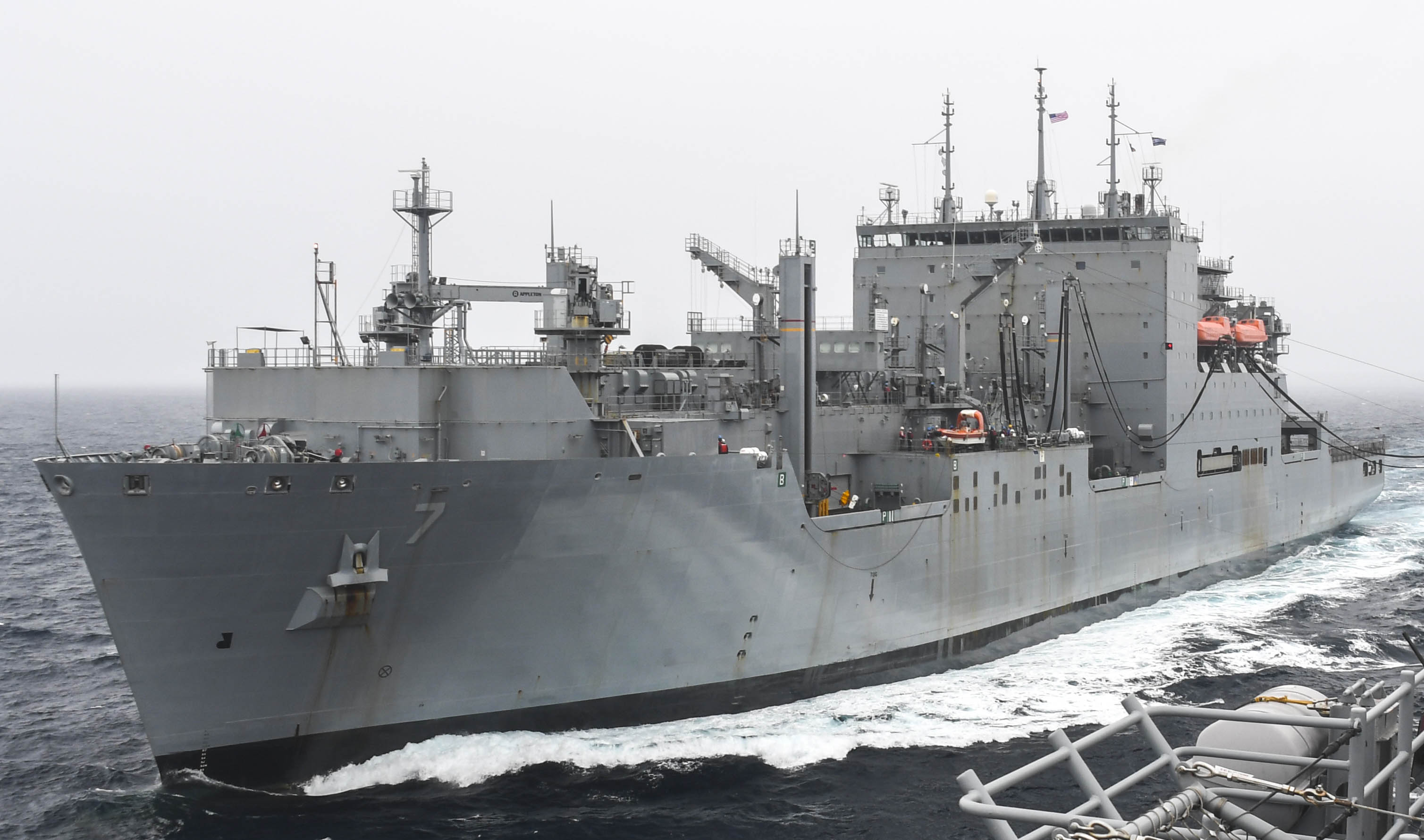
- USNS Carl Brashear in 2019

History
- Awarded: 11 January 2005
- Builder: National Steel and Shipbuilding
- Laid down: 2 November 2007
- Launched: 18 September 2008
- In service: 4 March 2009
- Identification: IMO number: 9345104; MMSI number: 368709000; Callsign: NBRS
- Motto: Audentes Fortuna Iuvat; ("Fortune Favors the Bold")
- Status: in active service
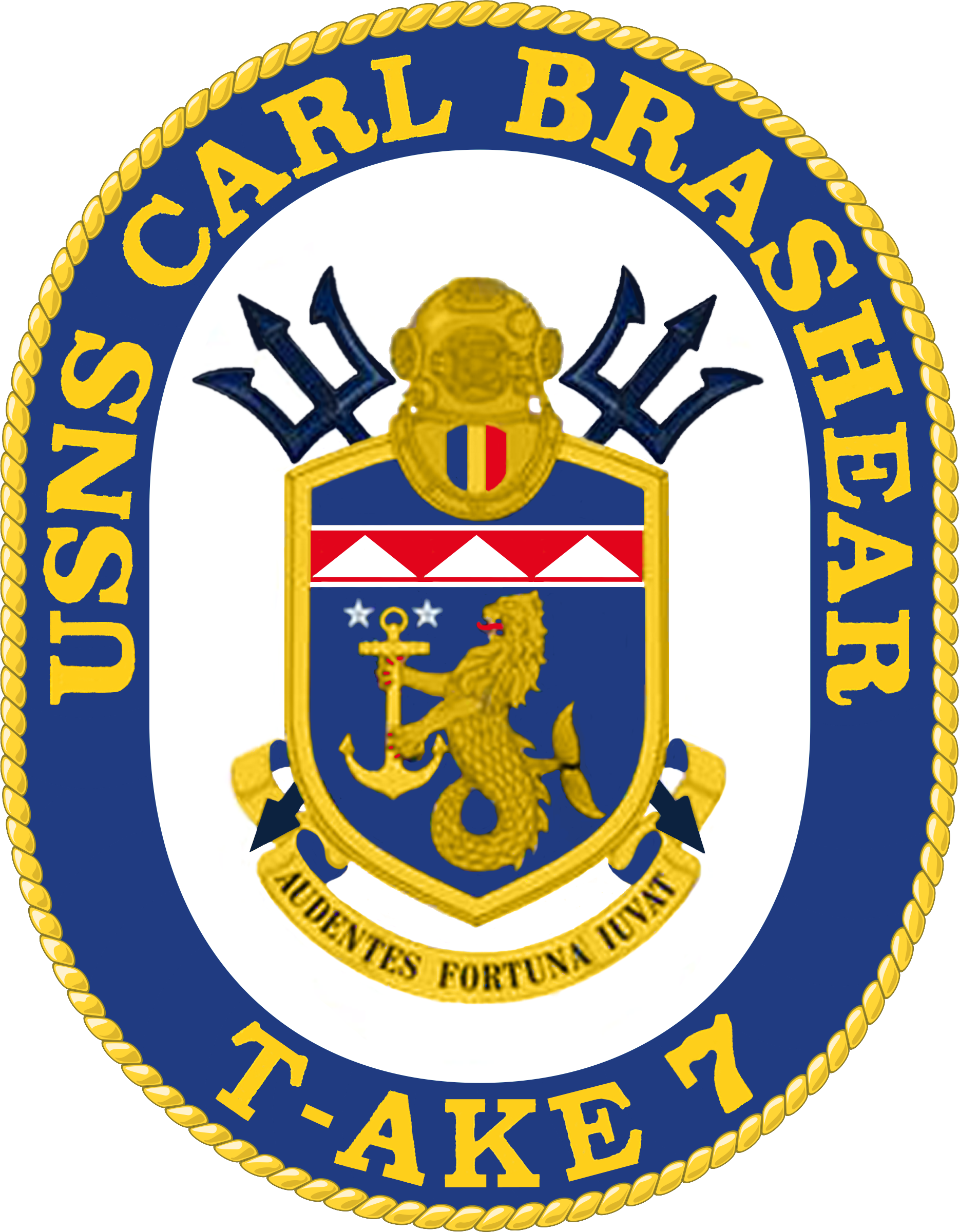
- Badge

General characteristics
- Class & type: Lewis and Clark-class cargo ship
- Displacement: 23,852 tons light, 40,298 tons full, 16,446 tons dead
- Length: 210 m (689 ft) overall, 199.3 m (654 ft) waterline
- Beam: 32.3 m (106 ft) extreme, 32.3 m (106 ft) waterline
- Draft: 9.1 m (30 ft) maximum, 9.4 m (31 ft) limit
- Propulsion: Integrated propulsion and ship service electrical system, with generation at 6.6 kV by FM/MAN B&W diesel generators; one fixed pitch propeller; bow thruster
- Speed: 20 knots (37 km/h)
- Range: 14,000 nautical miles at 20 kt; (26,000 km at 37 km/h)
- Capacity: Max dry cargo weight: 5,910 long tons (6,000 t); Max dry cargo volume: 783,000 cubic feet (22,200 m^{3}); Max cargo fuel weight: 2,350 long tons (2,390 t); Cargo fuel volume: 18,000 barrels (2,900 m³); (DFM: 10,500) (JP5:7,500)
- Complement: 123 civilian
- Electronic warfare & decoys: NONE
- Armament: 2–6 × 0.5 in (12.7 mm) machine guns; or 7.62 mm medium machine guns
- Aircraft carried: two helicopters, either Sikorsky MH-60S Knighthawk or Aerospatiale Puma

USNS Carl Brashear (T-AKE-7) is a Lewis and Clark-class dry cargo ship of the United States Navy, named in honor of Master Chief Boatswain's Mate Carl Brashear (1931–2006), one of the first African-Americans to become a US Navy Master Diver, despite having lost a leg in the 1966 Palomares incident.

The contract to build Carl Brashear was awarded to General Dynamics's subsidiary National Steel and Shipbuilding Company (NASSCO) of San Diego, California, on January 11, 2005. Her keel was laid down on November 2, 2007. The completed ship was delivered to the Navy on March 4, 2009.

During Operation Tomodachi, Carl Brashear loaded more than 800 pallets of humanitarian cargo at Sasebo's Juliet pier on March 20 and set sail later that day to join the Navy ships operating off northern Japan. Brashear completed 17 underway replenishment missions, delivering more than 1 million gallons (3,800 m^{3}) of fuel to ships supporting Tomodachi.
