= Sonora, Kentucky =

- City
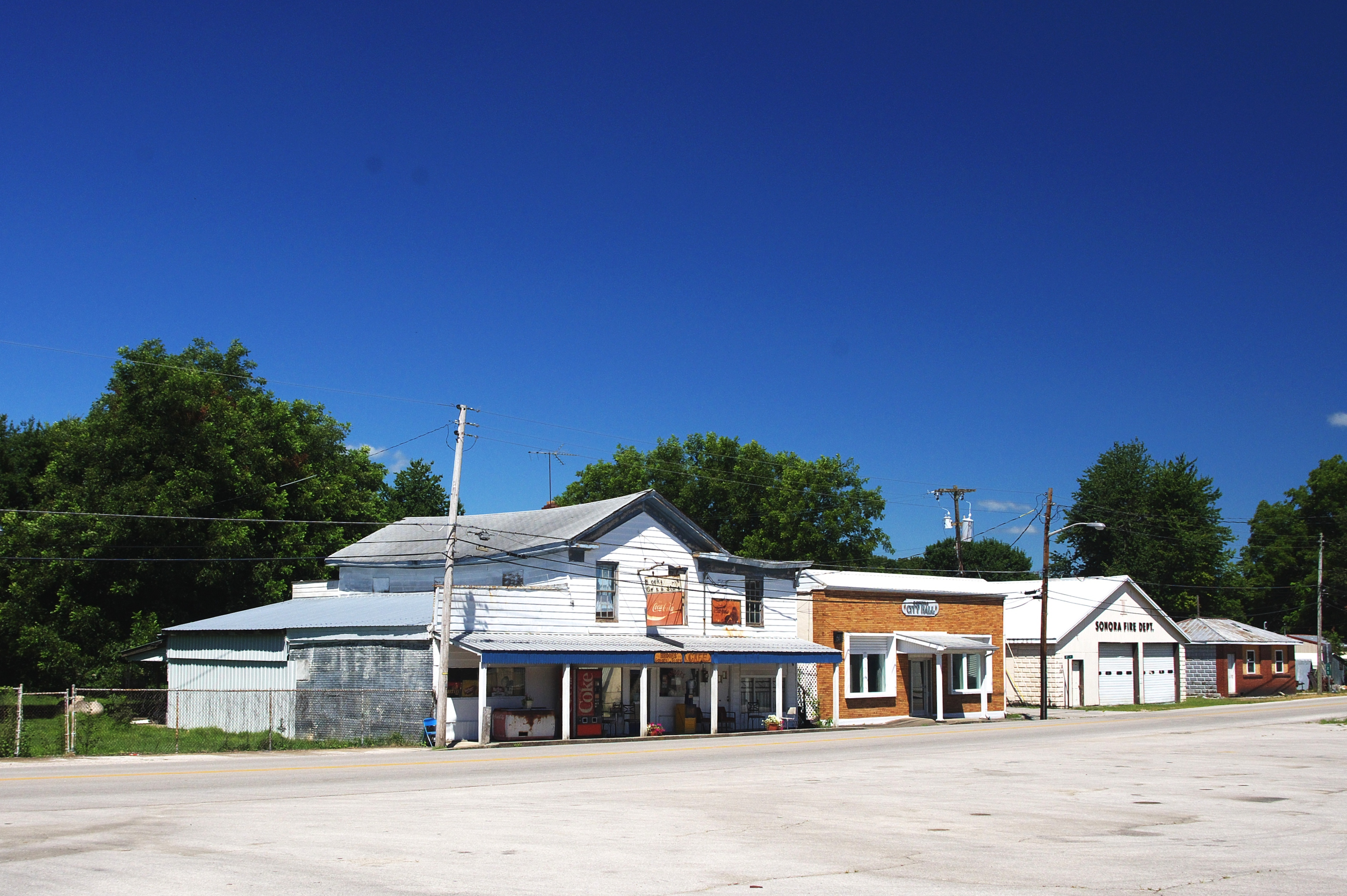
- Buildings along Main Street

- Location of Sonora in Hardin County, Kentucky.
- Coordinates: 37°31′33″N 85°53′40″W
- Country: United States
- State: Kentucky
- County: Hardin

Area
  - Total: 1.36 sq mi (3.53 km^{2})
  - Land: 1.36 sq mi (3.51 km^{2})
  - Water: 0.0077 sq mi (0.02 km^{2})
- Elevation: 725 ft (221 m)

Population (2020)
  - Total: 565
  - Density: 417/sq mi (160.9/km^{2})
- Time zone: UTC-5 (Eastern (EST))
  - Summer (DST): UTC-4 (EDT)
- ZIP code: 42776
- Area codes: 270 & 364
- FIPS code: 21-71724
- GNIS feature ID: 0503878

Sonora is a home rule-class city in Hardin County, Kentucky, United States. The population was 565 as of the 2020 Census, up from 513 from the 2010 census,. It is included in the Elizabethtown, Kentucky Metropolitan Statistical Area.

== History ==
Sonora began as an L&N Railroad construction camp known as "Bucksnort" in the late 1850s. This name is believed to have been inspired by the sounds of early locomotives, which the workers thought resembled deer snorts. When a depot was established at the site in 1859, the name was changed to "Sonora". This may have referred to Sonora, Mexico, the home of a railroad contractor.

U.S. Navy Master Diver Carl Brashear was born in nearby Tonieville and raised in Sonora.

== Geography ==
Sonora is located in southeastern Hardin County at 37°31′33″N 85°53′40″W (37.525783, -85.894373). The city is concentrated around the intersection of Kentucky Route 84 and Kentucky Route 720, with its municipal boundaries stretching eastward to the Hardin-LaRue county line. Interstate 65 passes through the eastern end of the city, with access from Exit 81. I-65 leads north 13 miles (21 km) to Elizabethtown, the county seat, and south 18 miles (29 km) to Munfordville.

According to the United States Census Bureau, the city has a total area of 1.2 square miles (3.0 km^{2}), of which 0.01 square miles (0.03 km^{2}), or 0.98%, are water.

== Demographics ==
=== 2020 census ===
As of the 2020 census, there were 565 people.

=== 2000 census ===
Historical population
Census	Pop.	Note	%±
1870	266		—
1880	289		8.6%
1890	228		−21.1%
1900	256		12.3%
1910	250		−2.3%
1920	274		9.6%
1930	248		−9.5%
1940	300		21.0%
1950	292		−2.7%
1960	268		−8.2%
1970	390		45.5%
1980	416		6.7%
1990	295		−29.1%
2000	350		18.6%
2010	513		46.6%
2020	565		10.1%
U.S. Decennial Census

At the 2000 census, there were 350 people, 138 households and 85 families residing in the city. The population density was 423.3 inhabitants per square mile (163.4/km^{2}). There were 159 housing units at an average density of 192.3 per square mile (74.2/km^{2}). The racial makeup of the city was 94.86% White, 2.86% African American, 0.29% Native American, 0.29% Asian, and 1.71% from two or more races.

There were 138 households, of which 31.9% had children under the age of 18 living with them, 48.6% were married couples living together, 10.1% had a female householder with no husband present, and 37.7% were non-families. 32.6% of all households were made up of individuals, and 18.8% had someone living alone who was 65 years of age or older. The average household size was 2.51 and the average family size was 3.22.

The age distribution was 26.6% under the age of 18, 8.0% from 18 to 24, 27.7% from 25 to 44, 18.6% from 45 to 64, and 19.1% who were 65 years of age or older. The median age was 36 years. For every 100 females, there were 81.3 males. For every 100 females age 18 and over, there were 86.2 males.

The median household income was $27,361 and the median family income was $37,500. Males had a median income of $28,438 and females $14,038. The per capita income was $13,554. About 6.1% of families and 10.6% of the population were below the poverty line, including 6.3% of those under age 18 and 11.9% of those age 65 or over.
