= William S. Guest =

US Navy rear-admiral (1913–1992)

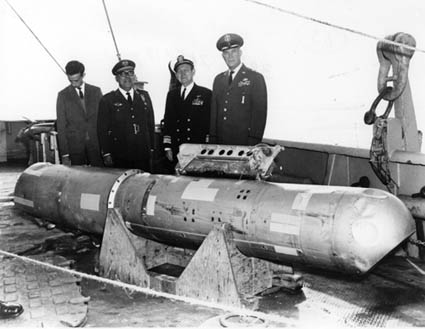
William S. Guest (in white cap) with the bomb recovered off Palomares

William Selman Guest (July 3, 1913 – August 13, 1992) was a United States Navy rear-admiral.

Guest served as a naval aviator during World War II. While attached to USS Yorktown he saw action at Tulagi Harbor on May 4, 1942 and in the Battle of the Coral Sea a few days later. For his valor in these actions he was awarded the Navy Cross.

After the war Guest was captain of USS Salisbury Sound 1957–58.

Guest was promoted to rear admiral, and in 1964 he commanded ComCarDiv 9 (Commander Carrier Division 9). His flag was aboard the USS Constellation, and his task force saw action in Vietnam and was involved in the Gulf of Tonkin Incident in August 1964. Guest and all those that served with him received the Navy Unit Commendation Ribbon and the Armed Forces Expeditionary Medal (which later was allowed to be exchanged for the Vietnam Service Medal) for action in the war zone of the South China Seas.

In 1966 Guest was commander of Task Force 65 of the United States Sixth Fleet when a U.S. Air Force B-52 bomber collided with a tanker and crashed near Palomares, Spain. It was carrying four thermonuclear weapons, one of which fell into the Mediterranean Sea. Guest deployed and commanded an 18-vessel US Navy task force, helped by civilian-operated submersibles Aluminaut and Alvin which eventually found the bomb, which was recovered intact. Guest was awarded the Distinguished Service Medal.
