= USS Notable (MSO-460) =

U.S. Navy minesweeper

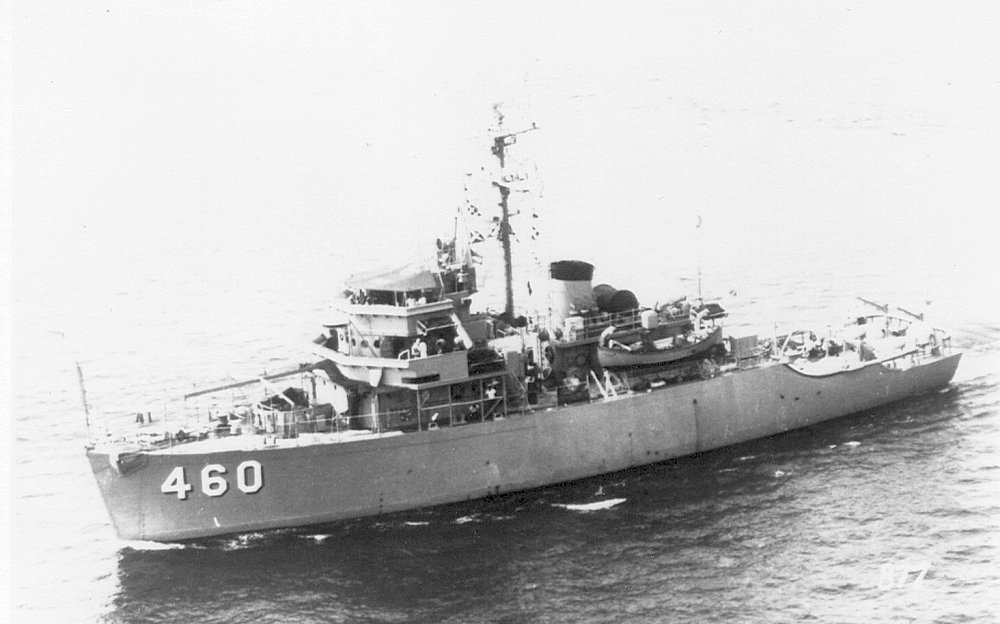

History

United States
- Laid down: 8 June 1953
- Launched: 15 October 1954
- Commissioned: 8 June 1955
- Decommissioned: date unknown
- Stricken: 1 February 1971
- Home port: Charleston, South Carolina
- Fate: Scrapped, 1971

General characteristics
- Displacement: 775 tons
- Length: 172 ft (52 m)
- Beam: 36 ft (11 m)
- Draught: 10 ft (3.0 m)
- Speed: 15 knots
- Complement: 65
- Armament: one 40 mm mount

USS Notable (AM-460/MSO-460) was an Aggressive-class minesweeper acquired by the U.S. Navy for the task of removing mines that had been placed in the water to prevent the safe passage of ships.

The second Notable (MSO-460) was laid down 8 June 1953 by Higgins, Inc., New Orleans, Louisiana; launched 15 October 1954 sponsored by Mrs. deLesseps G. Morrison, wife of the Mayor of New Orleans; and commissioned 8 June 1955.

== East Coast operations ==
Following shakedown out of Charleston, South Carolina, Notable served as a training ship for the Navy School of Mine Warfare, Norfolk, Virginia. Returning to Charleston on 18 November 1955, the mine sweeper operated with the U.S. 2nd Fleet in the Western Atlantic Ocean for the next two years, and then, on 9 January 1958, deployed to the Mediterranean for a six-month cruise with the U.S. 6th Fleet, returning 23 June. Temporarily assigned to the Loran "B" Experimental Development Force in October and November 1958, Notable operated off the U.S. East Coast until 18 September 1959 when she entered Norfolk Navy Yard for overhaul.

== North Atlantic operations ==
Engaging in Atlantic Ocean amphibious exercises in early 1960, and her second six months deployment to the Mediterranean, the ship departed Charleston in January 1961 for minesweeping exercises and a Caribbean cruise. Calling at ports in the Virgin Islands and the British West Indies, Notable sailed to Cape Canaveral, Florida, in April to assist Project Mercury Forces in the launching of America's first man in space, Lt. Comdr. Alan B. Shepard, USN. For the remainder of the year, the minesweeper operated off Florida, overhauling at Jacksonville, Florida, from July to October and deploying 6 January 1962 for another Caribbean cruise. She returned to Charleston 1 May, and operated off the Atlantic coast patrolling during the Cuban Missile Crisis in November 1962. On 17 September 1963 Notable, in company with other ships of Mine Division 85 departed Charleston for the Mediterranean.

== Caribbean and Mediterranean operations ==
The minesweeper returned to Charleston 1 March 1964 and on completion of overhaul in late June 1965, she deployed to Guantanamo Bay, Cuba for refresher training for a month with a one week visit to Port Antonio, Jamaica. In early August 1965 she returned to Charleston. In early September she departed Charleston for New York City where she ported at Brooklyn Navy Yard for minor preparations for two weeks, from there she continued to Portsmouth, New Hampshire for mine sweeping exercises, returning to Charleston in early October 1965. On 24 January 1966 she departed for her fourth Mediterranean deployment. Arriving Rota, Spain, 21 February, the ship was immediately ordered to participate in the search for a nuclear bomb lost in an air collision off Palomares. The minesweeper remained on this duty until salvage was completed 30 March. She then made goodwill visits to ports in Italy and France, and participated in intensive amphibious training until returning to Charleston 14 July.

== Later operations ==
Notable sailed 19 September for extensive minesweeping exercises off New England. This operation was immediately followed by a cruise to Puerto Rico where she joined other U.S. 2nd Fleet ships in "Operation LantFlex66", a full-scale mock invasion of Vieques Island. The minesweeper returned to Charleston 15 December and operated out of there for the next year.

== Decommissioning ==
Notable was decommissioned (date unknown) and was stricken from the Navy List 1 February 1971. She was sold for scrap in 1971.
