= Men of Honor =

2000 film by George Tillman Jr

- Theatrical release poster
- Directed by: George Tillman Jr.
- Written by: Scott Marshall Smith
- Produced by: Bill Badalato; Robert Teitel
- Starring: Robert De Niro; Cuba Gooding Jr.; Hal Holbrook; David Keith; Michael Rapaport; Powers Boothe; Aunjanue Ellis; Charlize Theron
- Cinematography: Anthony B. Richmond
- Edited by: John Carter; Dirk Westervelt
- Music by: Mark Isham
- Production companies: Fox 2000 Pictures; State Street Pictures
- Distributed by: 20th Century Fox
- Release date: November 10, 2000
- Running time: 128 minutes
- Country: United States
- Language: English
- Budget: $32 million
- Box office: $82.3 million

Men of Honor (released in the UK and Ireland as Men of Honour) is a 2000 American drama film directed by George Tillman Jr. and starring Robert De Niro and Cuba Gooding Jr.. The film is inspired by the true story of Master Chief Petty Officer Carl Brashear, the first African American master diver in the United States Navy.

Men of Honor was released by 20th Century Fox on November 10, 2000. The film received mixed reviews from critics and grossed $82.3 million against a $32 million budget.

== Plot ==
Carl Brashear leaves his native Kentucky and the life of a sharecropper in 1949 by joining the United States Navy. He is assigned to the galley of the salvage ship USS Hoist, and is inspired by the bravery of Master Chief Petty Officer Leslie William "Billy" Sunday, who free-dives to rescue a diver knocked overboard without an air line. Sunday develops an air embolism that prevents him from diving without a fatal risk. Carl is inspired to become the first Black American Navy diver, intending to qualify as a master diver.

Master Chief Sunday is the head instructor at the Diving and Salvage School in Bayonne, New Jersey, but the school's racist commanding officer Mr. Pappy orders Sunday to fail Carl and the other students, led by Dylan Rourke, refuse to bunk with him. Carl had left school in the seventh grade to work on his family's farm and he receives assistance from Jo, a female medical student working part-time in the New York Public Library. Carl proves his diving abilities by rescuing a fellow student abandoned by his dive partner Rourke when a salvage exercise goes wrong. Mr. Pappy's ensures Rourke is awarded a medal, and credit for Carl’s heroism. The students must each assemble a flange underwater using a bag of tools as a final evaluation. Mr. Pappy orders Carl’s bag cut open to prevent his passing. Carl takes an addition nine hour to locate his spilled tools, in cold water, but completes the assembly and graduates from diving school. Sunday is demoted to senior chief by Mr. Pappy.

Carl and Sunday's career paths diverge. Sunday continually loses his composure around officers who disrespect his accomplishments until he is demoted to chief petty officer and relegated to menial duties. Carl marries Jo and rises quickly through the ranks, becoming a national hero in the 1966 Palomares incident for evading a Soviet submarine, recovering a missing hydrogen bomb and nearly severing his left leg below the knee while saving the lives of Navy crewmen. Carl consents to the amputation of his leg, feeling a prosthesis would allow him to return to active duty and a relatively normal life, making him the first American sailor to ever return to full active duty with a prosthetic limb.

Carl reunites with Sunday, who helps him train to fight the Navy's bureaucracy and the antagonistic Captain Hanks (Carl’s and Sunday's former Hoist executive officer) to return to full active duty and fulfil his dream of becoming a master diver. Carl passes a readiness evaluation and attends a reinstatement hearing by the Chief of Naval Personnel in Washington, D.C. Hanks introduces the latest Navy technology, a 290-pound copper diving suit, and tells Carl that he must walk 12 steps to qualify for reinstatement. Carl stands and takes all 12 steps with encouragement from Sunday and is reinstated to full active duty. Carl becomes a master diver two years later.

== Cast ==
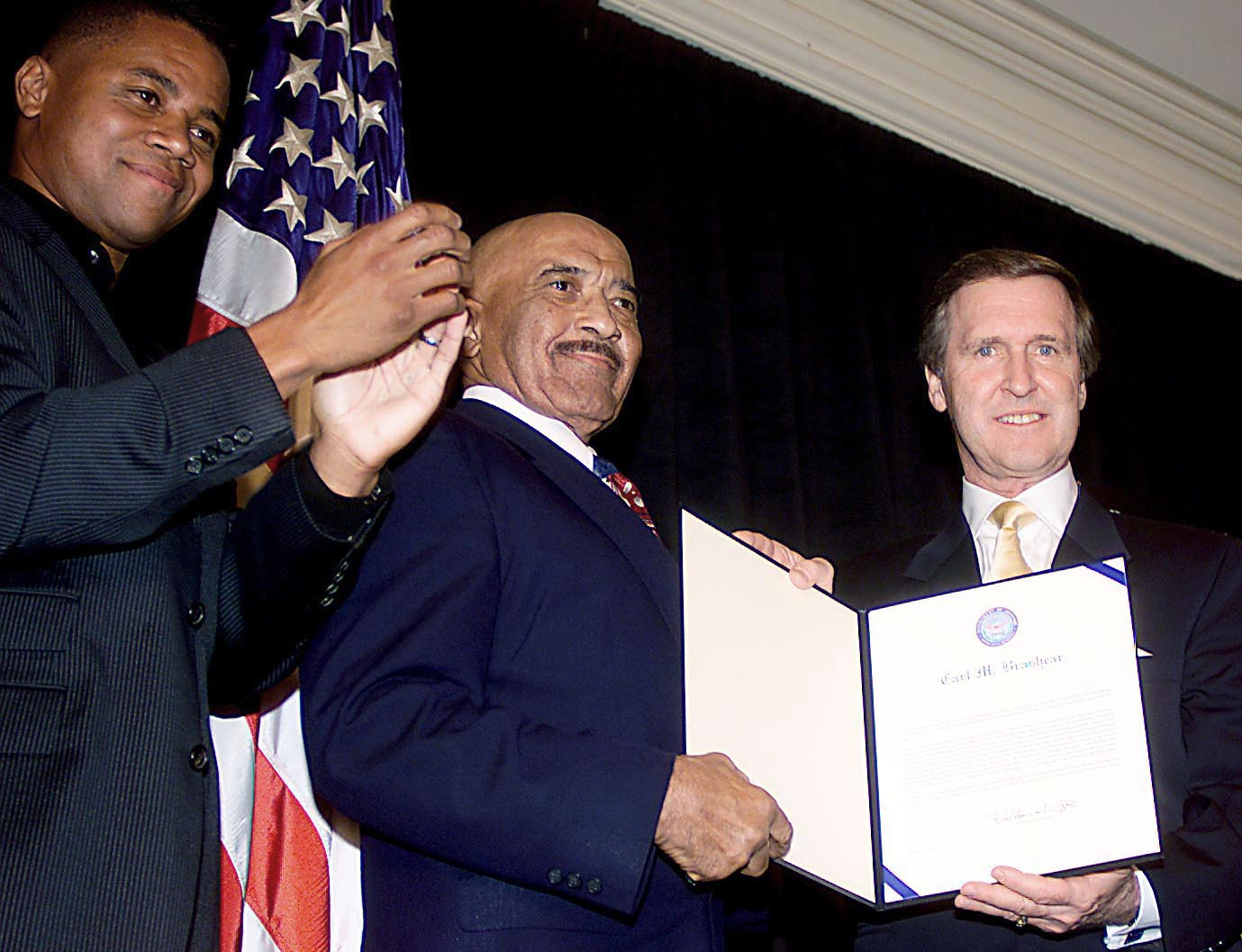
Carl Brashear (center) received an Outstanding Public Service Award in October 2000 from actor Cuba Gooding Jr. and then-Defense Secretary William Cohen for 42 years of combined military and federal civilian service. Gooding portrayed Brashear in the 2000 film Men of Honor.

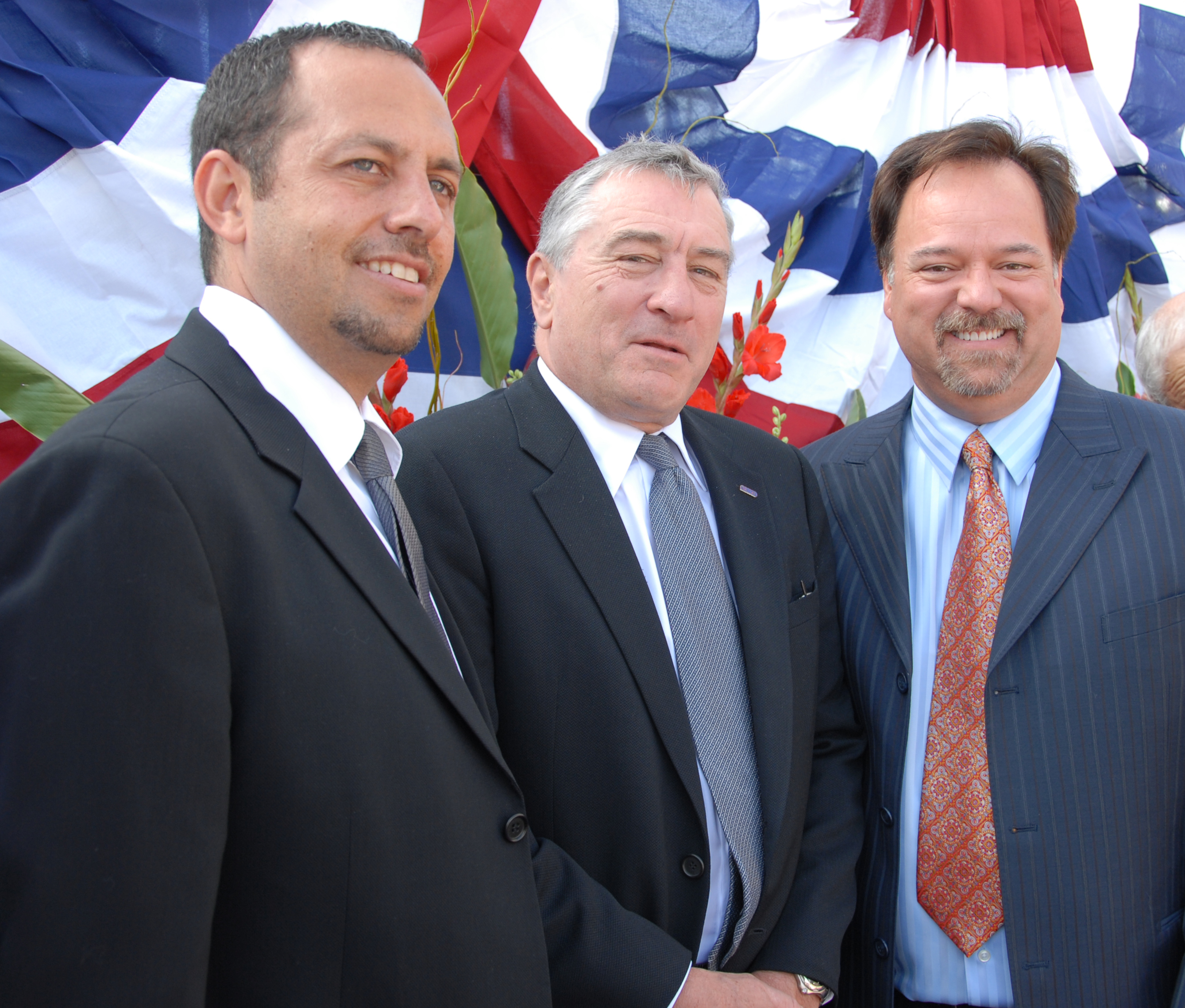
Producer Robert Teitel, Robert De Niro, and screenwriter Scott Smith in September 2008

- Robert De Niro as Master Chief Leslie "Billy" Sunday (based on Boatswain's Mate First Class Harry M. Rutherford)
- Cuba Gooding Jr. as Boatswain's Mate Second Class (later Master Diver) Carl Brashear
  - Chris Warren Jr. as Young Carl
- Charlize Theron as Gwen Sunday
- Aunjanue Ellis as Jo Brashear
- Hal Holbrook as Camp Commanding Officer "Mr. Pappy" Captain USN.
- Michael Rapaport as Gunners Mate Snowhill, Brashear's barracks mate.
- Powers Boothe as Captain Pullman
- David Keith as Captain Hartigan
- Holt McCallany as Machinist's Mate First Class Dylan Rourke
- David Conrad as Captain Hanks
- Joshua Leonard as Petty Officer Second Class Timothy Douglas Isert
- Carl Lumbly as Mac Brashear, Carl's Father
- Lonette McKee as Ella Brashear, Carl's mother
- Glynn Turman as Chief Floyd
- Joshua Feinman as DuBoyce
- Lindsay Thomas as Girl in Bar

== Production ==
The film features the classic U.S. Navy Mark V diving rig, which was used for deep-sea and salvage diving from 1916 through the early 1980s. The Mark V helmets were manufactured by four companies: Morse Diving Equipment Company, A. Schrader's Son, DESCO, and Miller-Dunn. DESCO manufactured much of the authentic equipment used in the film. However, the helmets were not actual U.S. Navy Mark V helmets; instead, the production used commercial helmet tops fitted to Mark V breastplates. These can be identified by their oval side windows and screw-in front doors. The standard Mark V diving rig weighed approximately 200 pounds (91 kg).

== Reception ==
The film opened in third place at the North American box office behind Little Nicky and Charlie's Angels, which was on its second week at the top spot.

Men of Honor was met with mixed reviews. On Rotten Tomatoes, it currently has an approval rating of 42%, based on 106 reviews, with an average rating of 5.3/10. The critics consensus states, "De Niro and Gooding Jr. manage to turn in performances that make this by-the-numbers inspirational movie watchable." According to Metacritic, which compiled 30 reviews and calculated a weighted average score of 56 out of 100, the film received "mixed or average" reviews. Audiences polled by CinemaScore gave the film an average grade of "A" on a scale of A+ to F.

Roger Ebert of the Chicago Sun-Times gave the film three stars out of four, calling it "an old-fashioned biopic", but criticized Theron's appearance in the film, calling it "professional but unnecessary to the picture".

== Historical accuracy ==
While the film portrays a Wisconsin recruit as the only white recruit to remain in Carl Brashear's bunk, the actual individual was a Brazilian diver named Alberto José do Nascimento, who was also dark-skinned. Alberto also helped Brashear save a fellow recruit who was trapped underwater during a training exercise.

Additionally, Leslie Sunday is depicted as a Master Chief Petty Officer at the beginning of the film, which is set in 1949. However, the U.S. Navy's Senior Chief Petty Officer (E-8) and Master Chief Petty Officer (E-9) pay grades were established effective June 1, 1958, under an amendment to the Career Compensation Act of 1949. Thus, the rank designation is anachronistic; at the time depicted, Sunday would have held the rank of Chief Petty Officer.

== Soundtrack ==
Mark Isham's soundtrack album was released in 2000.
