= USS Salute (AM-470) =

Minesweeper of the United States Navy

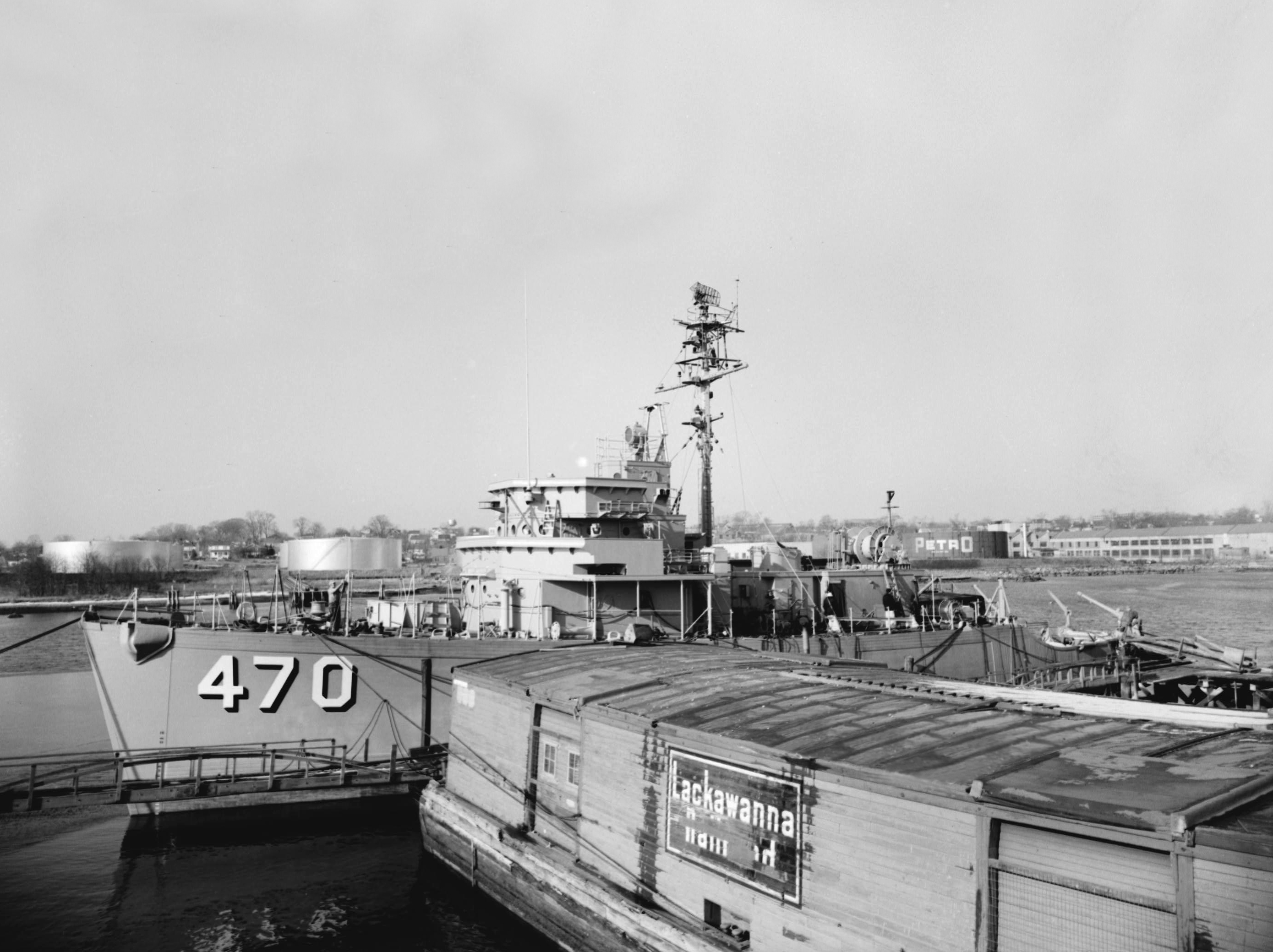
- USS Salute on 26 January 1955

History

United States
- Name: USS Salute
- Builder: Luders Marine Construction Co., Stamford, Connecticut
- Laid down: 17 March 1953
- Launched: 14 August 1954, as AM-470
- Commissioned: 4 May 1955
- Decommissioned: 15 May 1970
- Reclassified: MSO-470 (Ocean Minesweeper), 7 February 1955
- Stricken: 1 February 1971
- Fate: Sold for scrapping, August 1971

General characteristics
- Class & type: Aggressive-class minesweeper
- Displacement: 630 long tons (640 t) light; 755 long tons (767 t) full load
- Length: 172 ft (52 m)
- Beam: 35 ft (11 m)
- Draft: 12 ft (4 m)
- Propulsion: 4 × Packard ID1700 diesel engines; 2 × shafts; 2 × controllable pitch propellers
- Speed: 14 knots (26 km/h; 16 mph)
- Complement: 8 officers, 70 enlisted
- Armament: 1 × single 40 mm gun mount (later replaced by 1 × twin 20 mm gun mount); 2 × .50 cal (12.7 mm) twin Browning M2 machine guns

USS Salute (MSO-470) was an Aggressive-class minesweeper acquired by the U.S. Navy for the task of removing mines that had been placed in the water to prevent the safe passage of ships.

Salute was laid down on 17 March 1953 by the Luders Marine Construction Co., Stamford, Connecticut; launched on 14 August 1954; sponsored by Mrs. Frederick A. Edwards; reclassified MSO-470 on 7 February 1955; and commissioned on 4 May 1955.

== Service history ==
Based at Charleston, South Carolina, Salute provided minesweeping services along the U.S. East Coast, in the Caribbean, and in the Mediterranean from 1955 to 1970. Duty with the 6th Fleet took her to the Mediterranean six times during this period.

=== Search for lost H-Bomb off Spain ===
In March 1966, Salute used special equipment to aid in the search off the Spanish coast for an H-bomb lost in waters off Palomares after a mid-air bomber collision. In May 1967, she received visitors on board while at the world's fair at Montreal, Canada.

=== Inactivity and decommissioning ===
She remained active in the U.S. Atlantic Fleet until decommissioned on 15 May 1970 for mine warfare conversion. However, on 16 October, her conversion was cancelled; she was struck from the Navy list on 1 February 1971 and was sold for scrapping in August to Charles Gural of Rahway, New Jersey for $1,700.
