= 1966 Palomares accident =

Collision between a USAF B-52G and KC-135 over the Mediterranean Sea near Spain

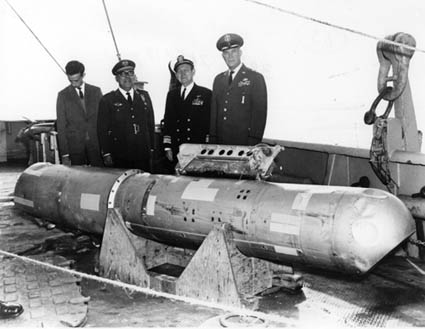
- The B28FI nuclear bomb, recovered from 2,850 feet (870 m) of water, on the deck of the USS Petrel

Collision
- Date: 17 January 1966
- Summary: Mid-air collision
- Site: near Palomares, Almería, Spain; 37°14′57″N 1°47′49″W
- Total fatalities: 7
- Total survivors: 4

First aircraft
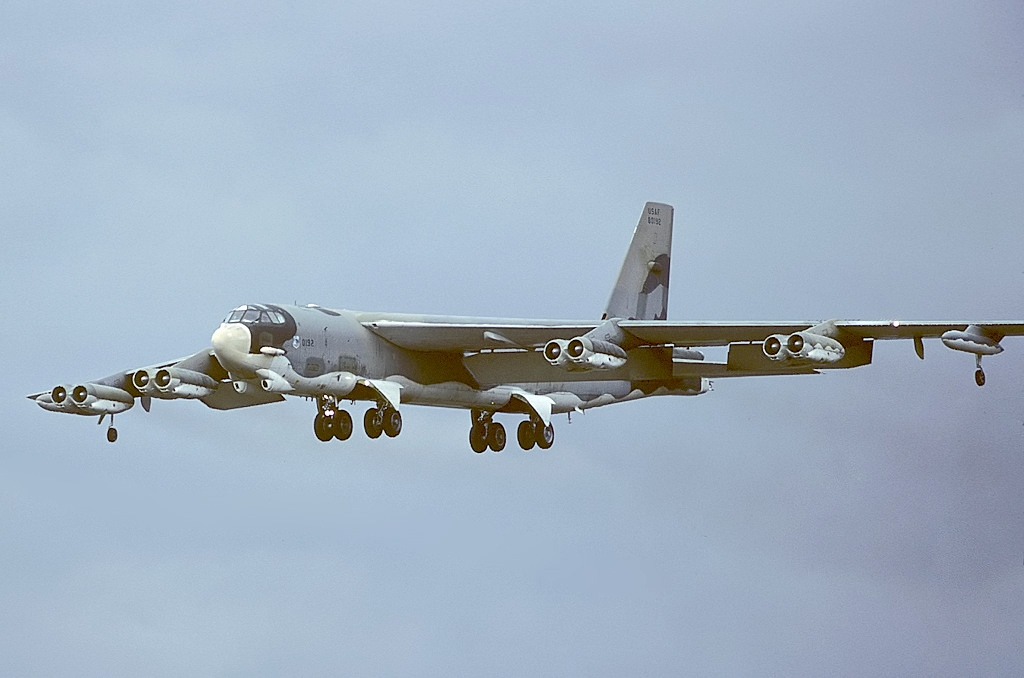
- 58-0192, an aircraft similar to the B-52 involved
- Type: Boeing B-52G Stratofortress
- Operator: Strategic Air Command, United States Air Force
- Registration: 58-0256
- Flight origin: Seymour Johnson Air Force Base; North Carolina, United States
- Destination: Seymour Johnson Air Force Base
- Occupants: 7
- Crew: 7
- Fatalities: 3
- Survivors: 4

Second aircraft
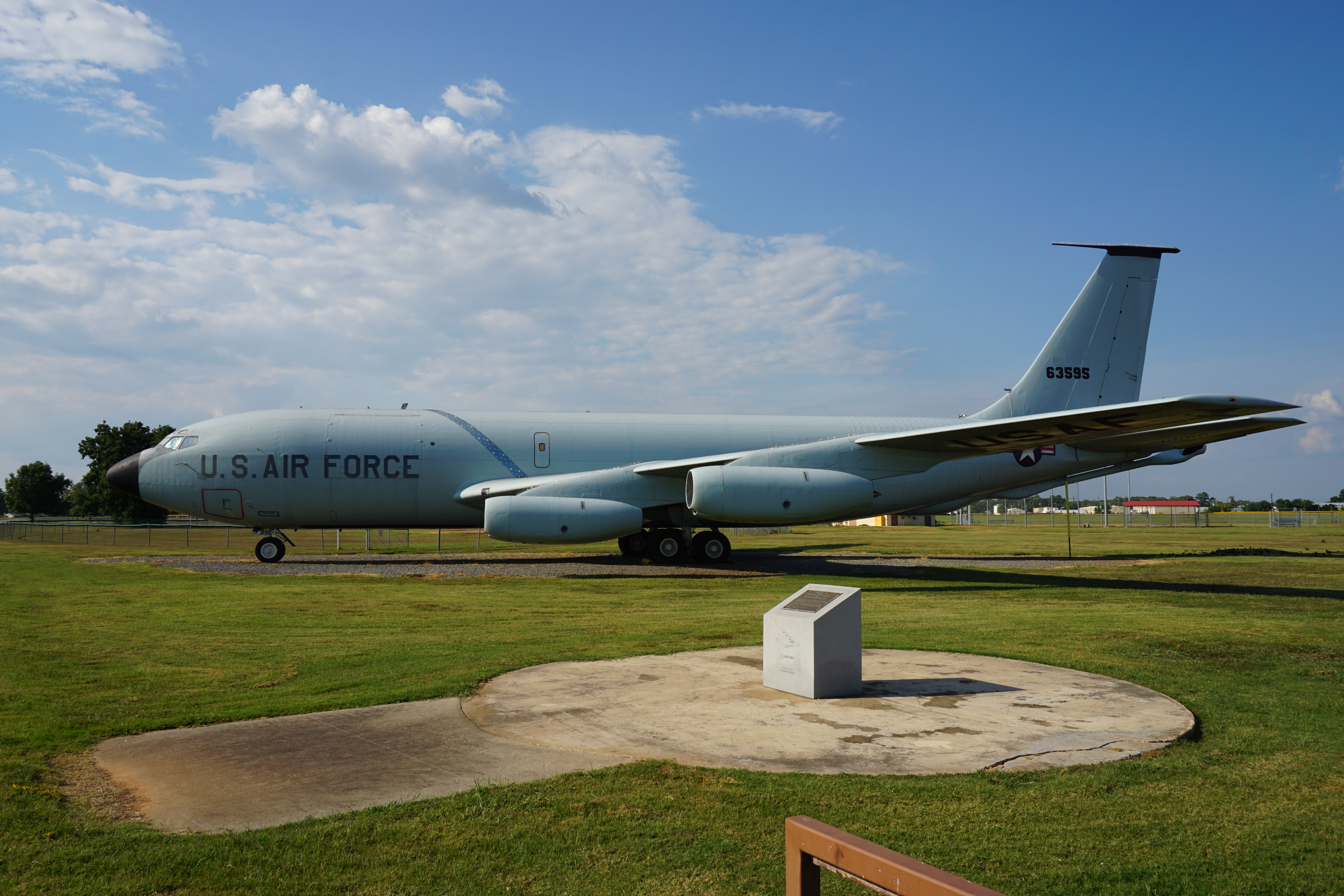
- 56-3595, an aircraft similar to the second aircraft involved
- Type: KC-135 Stratotanker
- Operator: United States Air Force
- Registration: 61-0273
- Flight origin: Morón Air Base, Spain
- Destination: Morón Air Base
- Occupants: 4
- Crew: 4
- Fatalities: 4
- Survivors: 0

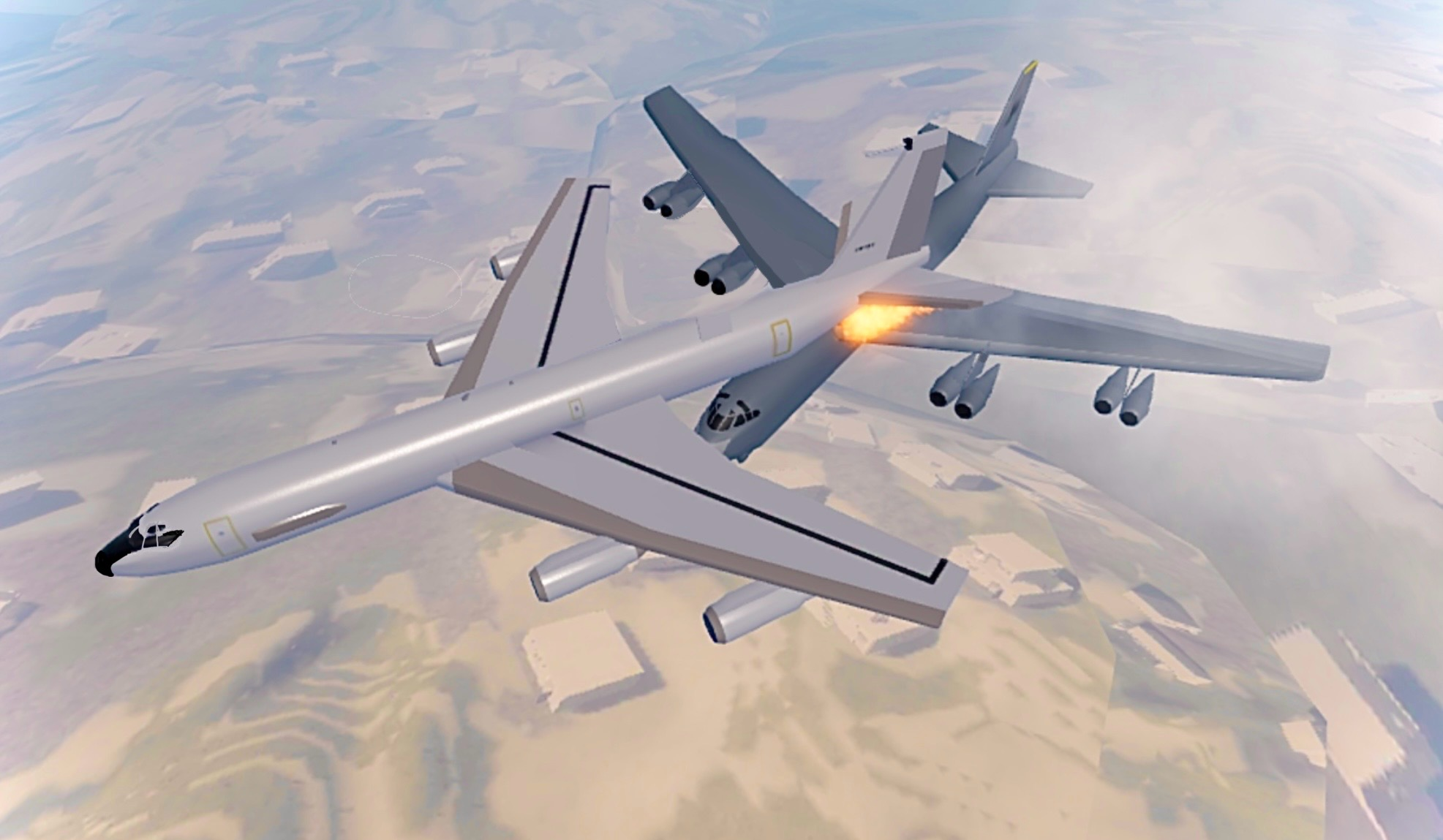
3D reconstruction of the 1966 mid-air collision over Palomares.

The Palomares accident occurred on 17 January 1966, when a United States Air Force B-52G bomber collided with a KC-135 tanker during mid-air refueling at 31,000 feet (9,450 m) over the Mediterranean Sea, near the Spanish village of Palomares in Almería province. The collision destroyed the tanker, killing all four crew members, and caused the bomber to break apart, resulting in the deaths of three of its seven crew members. The B-52G was participating in Operation Chrome Dome, a Cold War airborne alert mission involving continuous flights of nuclear-armed bombers.

At the time of the accident, the B-52G was carrying four B28FI Mod 2 Y1 thermonuclear bombs. Three of these bombs fell on land near Palomares; the conventional explosives in two detonated upon impact (there was no nuclear explosion triggered), dispersing plutonium and contaminating approximately 2 square kilometers (0.77 sq mi) of terrain. The fourth bomb fell into the Mediterranean Sea and was recovered intact after an extensive 80-day search involving the U.S. Navy, including the use of submersibles such as DSV Alvin. A local fisherman, Francisco Simó Orts, witnessed the bomb's descent into the sea and assisted in its recovery.

In response to the contamination, the U.S. and Spanish authorities conducted cleanup operations, removing approximately 1,750 tons of radioactive soil, which was shipped to the United States for disposal. Despite these efforts, residual contamination persisted, leading to ongoing monitoring and a 2015 agreement between Spain and the U.S. to further remediate the area. As of 2025, some contaminated land remains, and the cleanup has not been fully completed.

Politically, the accident prompted Spain to ban U.S. flights carrying nuclear weapons over its territory. The Palomares accident, along with the similar 1968 Thule Air Base B-52 crash, contributed to the termination of Operation Chrome Dome. Despite its significance, the town of Palomares has no official monument commemorating the event, although a street named "17 January 1966" serves as a reminder.

== Accident ==
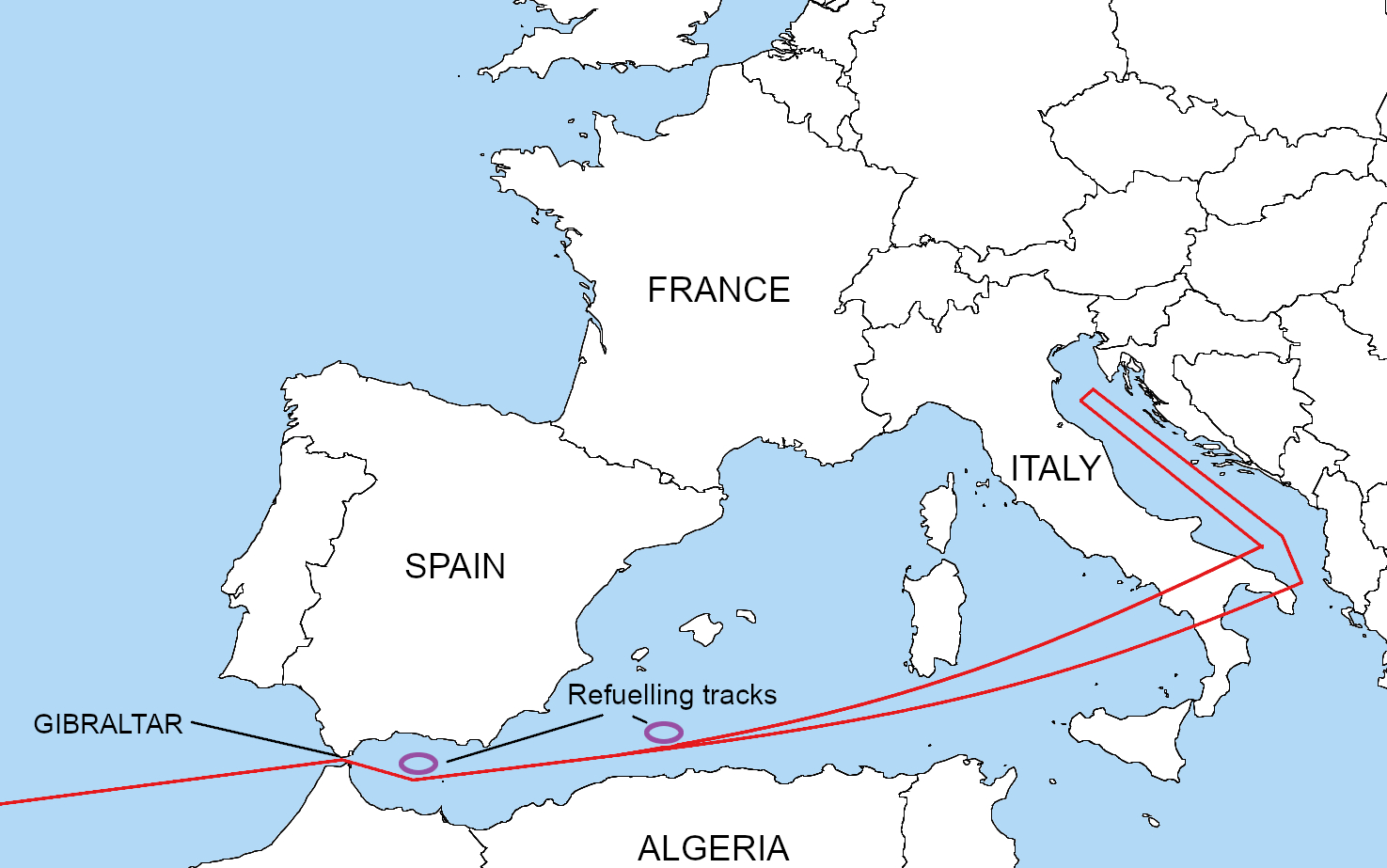
Operation Chrome Dome flight path over southern Europe, showing refueling tracks

The B-52G began its mission from Seymour Johnson Air Force Base, North Carolina, carrying four B28FI Mod 2 Y1 thermonuclear bombs on a Cold War airborne alert mission named Operation Chrome Dome. The flight plan took the aircraft east across the Atlantic Ocean and Mediterranean Sea towards the European borders of the Soviet Union before returning home. The lengthy flight required two mid-air refuelings over Spain.

At about 10:30 am on 17 January 1966, while flying at 31,000 feet (9,450 m), the bomber commenced its second aerial refueling with a KC-135 out of Morón Air Base in southern Spain. The B-52 pilot, Major Larry G. Messinger, later recalled,

We came in behind the tanker, and we were a little bit fast, and we started to overrun him a little bit. There is a procedure they have in refueling where if the boom operator feels that you're getting too close and it's a dangerous situation, he will call, "Break away, break away, break away." There was no call for a break away, so we didn't see anything dangerous about the situation. But all of a sudden, all hell seemed to break loose.

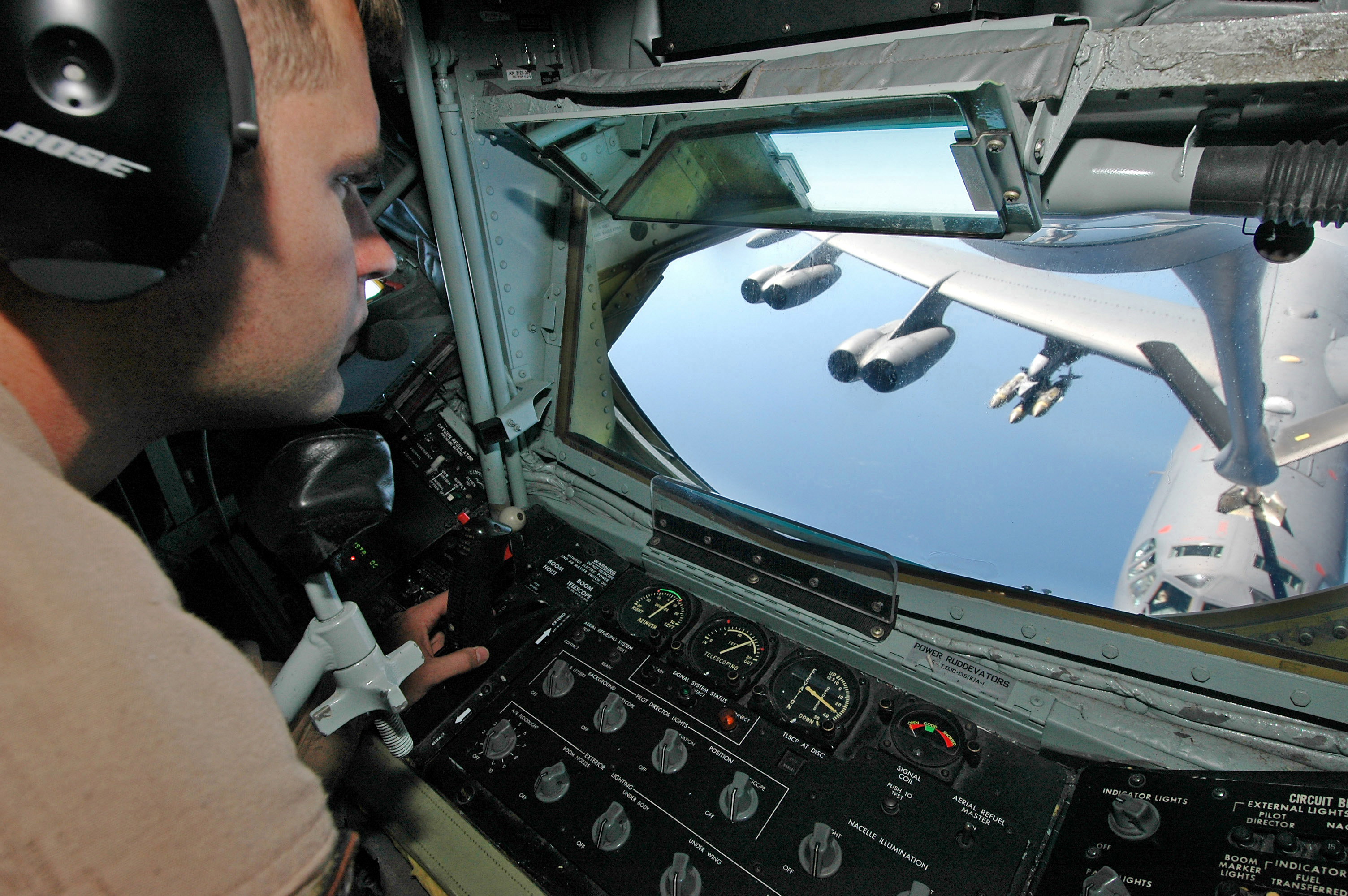
Boom operator's view of a B-52 from a KC-135 tanker

The planes collided, with the nozzle of the refueling boom striking the top of the B-52 fuselage, breaking a longeron and snapping off the left wing, which resulted in an explosion that was witnessed by a second B-52 about a mile (1.6 km) away. All four men on the KC-135 and three of the seven men on the bomber were killed.

Spain

Those killed in the tanker were boom operator Master Sergeant Lloyd Potolicchio, pilot Major Emil J. Chapla, co-pilot Captain Paul R. Lane, and navigator Captain Leo E. Simmons.

On board the bomber, navigator First Lieutenant Steven G. Montanus, electronic warfare officer First Lieutenant George J. Glessner, and gunner Technical Sergeant Ronald P. Snyder were killed. Montanus was seated on the lower deck of the main cockpit and was able to eject from the plane, but his parachute never opened. Glessner and Snyder were on the upper deck, near the point where the refueling boom struck the fuselage, and were not able to eject.

Four of the seven crew members of the bomber managed to parachute to safety: in addition to pilot Major Messinger, aircraft commander Captain Charles F. Wendorf, copilot First Lieutenant Michael J. Rooney, and radar-navigator Captain Ivens Buchanan successfully bailed out. Buchanan received burns from the explosion and was unable to separate himself from his ejection seat, but he was nevertheless able to open his parachute, and survived the impact with the ground. The other three surviving crew members landed safely several miles out to sea.

The Palomares residents carried Buchanan to a local clinic, while Wendorf and Rooney were picked up at sea by the fishing boat Dorita. The last to be rescued was Messinger, who spent 45 minutes in the water before he was brought aboard the fishing boat Agustin y Rosa by Francisco Simó. All three men who landed in the sea were taken to a hospital in Águilas.

Under United States military nuclear-incident terminology, the event is categorised as a Broken Arrow, the flagword for a nuclear weapons accident and a more serious category than a nuclear weapons incident (flagword Bent Spear). This classification reflects the loss and destruction of nuclear weapons, the non-nuclear detonation of two weapons on land, and the actual occurrence of radioactive contamination.

== Weapons ==
The weapons lost during the accident were four B28FI Mod 2 Y1 thermonuclear bombs.

The letters FI indicated B28 bombs configured in the full fuzing internal configuration. A full fuzing capability means the weapons could be delivered via all bomb delivery options, including free-fall airburst, retarded airburst, freefall groundburst and laydown groundburst delivery. In this configuration, the W28 warhead was fitted between a Mk28 Mod 3F shock-absorbing nose and a Mk28 Mod 0 FISC rear end containing a parachute. The shock-absorbing nose enabled the weapon to survive laydown delivery, while the parachute slowed the weapon down in retarded airburst and laydown delivery.

The Mod 2 nomenclature indicates the hardened version of the weapon designed to survive laydown delivery; earlier Mod 0 and Mod 1 weapons could not survive the forces involved. The Y1 nomenclature indicates a W28 warhead with a yield of 1.1 megatonnes of TNT (4,600 TJ).

== Weapons recovery ==
The aircraft and weapons fell to the ground near the fishing village of Palomares, part of the Cuevas del Almanzora municipality in Almeria province, Spain. Three of the weapons were located on land within 24 hours of the accident—the conventional explosives in two had exploded on impact, spreading radioactive contamination, while a third was found relatively intact in a riverbed. The fourth weapon could not be found despite an intensive search of the area—the only part that was recovered was the parachute tail plate, leading searchers to postulate that the weapon's parachute had deployed, and that the wind had carried it out to sea.

On 22 January, the Air Force contacted the U.S. Navy for assistance. The Navy convened a Technical Advisory Group (TAG), chaired by Rear Admiral L. V. Swanson with Dr. John P. Craven and Captain Willard Franklyn Searle, to identify resources and skilled personnel that needed to be moved to Spain.

The search for the fourth bomb was carried out by means of a novel mathematical method, Bayesian search theory, led by Craven. This method assigns probabilities to individual map grid squares, then updates these as the search progresses. Initial probability input is required for the grid squares, and these probabilities made use of the fact that a local fisherman, Francisco Simó Orts, popularly known since as "Paco el de la bomba" ("Bomb Paco" or "Bomb Frankie"), witnessed the bomb entering the water at a certain location. Simó Orts was hired by the U.S. Air Force to assist in the search operation.

The United States Navy assembled the following ships in response to the Air Force request for assistance:

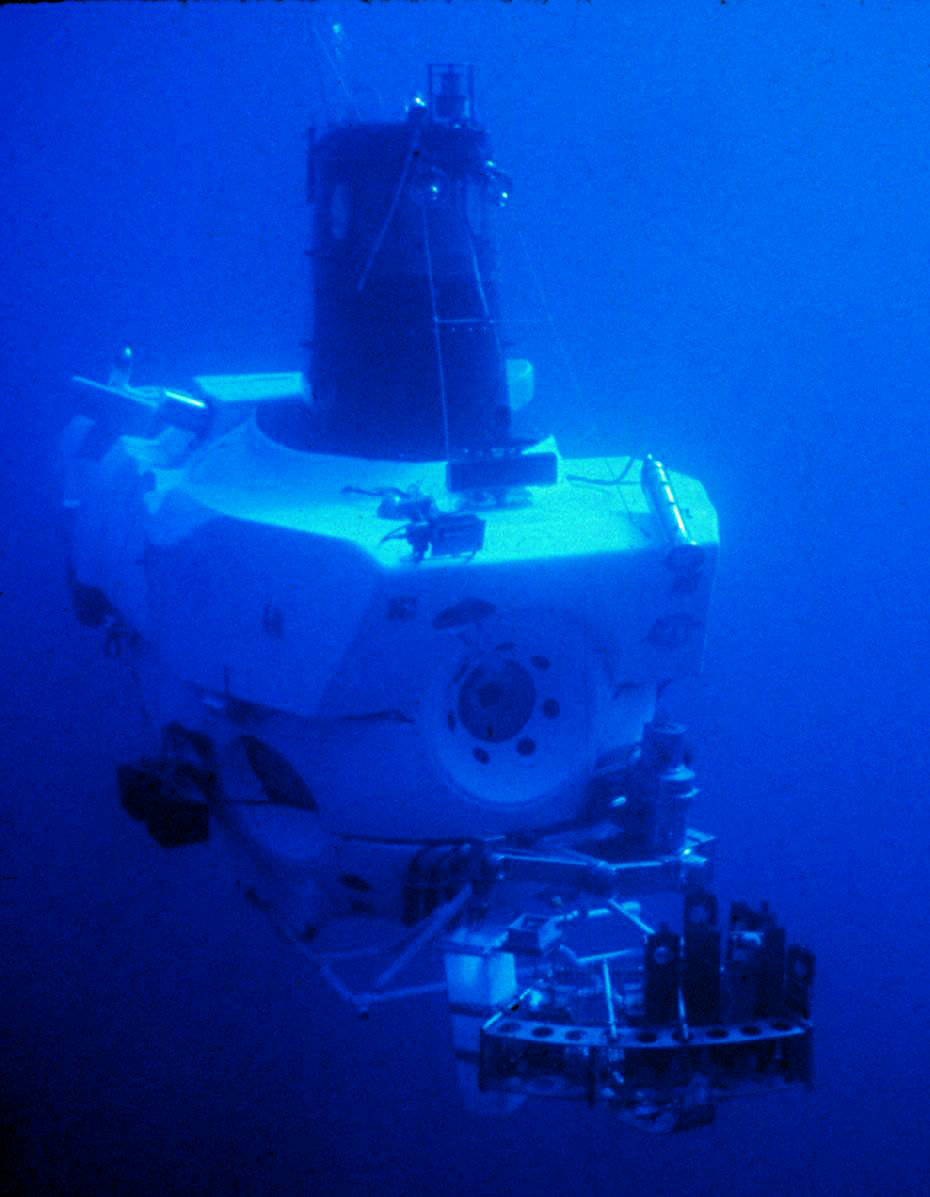
Alvin submersible

- USS Kiowa, a Navajo class fleet tug, arrived 27 January, first on scene
- USS Macdonough, flagship through January
- USS Nimble
- USS Pinnacle, found UQS-1 SONAR contact where Francisco Simo-Orts saw the bomb fall
- USS Rival, mother ship for PC3B submersible
- USS Sagacity, confirmed Pinnacle's SONAR contact
- USS Salute
- USS Skill
- USS Nespelen
- USS Fort Snelling, served as a support ship for the submersibles
- USS Boston, flagship 30 January – 15 March
- USS Albany, flagship 15 March through April
- USS Notable, minesweeper of Minesweeper Division 85 out of Charleston, SC, supported both submersibles ‘’Aluminaut’’ and ‘’Alvin’’ during the search; Jon Lindbergh piloted the "Alvin" submersible and supported the Westinghouse ocean-bottom, side-scanning sonar (OBSS). That sonar array, deployed beneath the USS Notable, may have detected the nuclear bomb which was still aboard the B-52 bomber when it entered the water.
- USS Plymouth Rock, transported Aluminaut and Alvin to the search site
- USS Petrel
- USS Tringa
- USS Charles R. Ware
- USS Hoist
- USS Lindenwald, transported Aluminaut to Miami, Florida, after the Palomares accident
- USNS Mizar
- USNS Dutton
- DSV Alvin
- Aluminaut
- PC-3B (Ocean Systems, Inc. submersible capable of searching to 600 feet (180 m))
- Deep Jeep (a Navy submersible capable of diving to 2,000 feet (610 m))
- CURV-I (Cable-Controlled Underwater Recovery Vehicle)
- USS Luiseno, removed aircraft wreck debris from the search site
- USS Everglades, removed aircraft wreck debris from the search site
- USNS Lt. George W. G. Boyce, removed radioactive contaminated soil from Spain.

Additionally, the aircraft carrier USS Forrestal and various other units of the Sixth Fleet made a brief stopover at Palomares on the morning of 15 March 1966; Forrestal anchored at 09:03 and departed at 12:19.

The recovery operation was led by the Supervisor of Salvage, Captain Searle. Hoist, Petrel and Tringa brought 150 qualified divers who searched to 120 feet (37 m) with compressed air, to 210 feet (64 m) with mixed gas, and to 350 feet (110 m) with hard-hat rigs; but the bomb lay in an uncharted area of the Rio Almanzora canyon on a 70-degree slope at a depth of 2,550 feet (780 m). After a search that continued for 80 days following the crash, the bomb was located by the DSV Alvin on 17 March, but was dropped and temporarily lost when the Navy attempted to bring it to the surface. After the loss of the recovered bomb, the ship's positions were fixed by Decca HI-FIX position-locating equipment for subsequent recovery attempts.

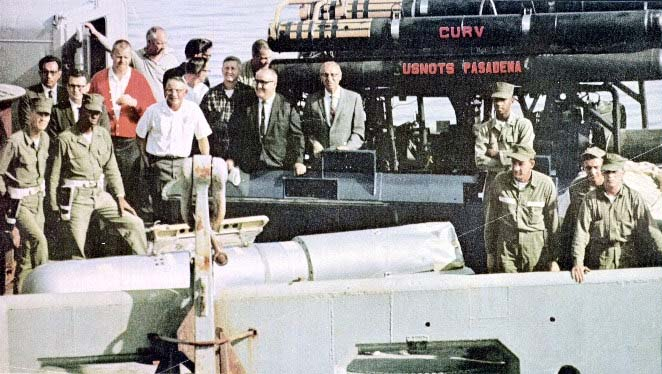
The recovered thermonuclear bomb displayed on the fantail of the submarine rescue ship USS Petrel after it was located by DSV Alvin and recovered by CURV-I, pictured, at a depth of 2,500 feet (760 m)

Alvin located the bomb again on 2 April, this time at a depth of 2,900 feet (880 m). On 7 April, an unmanned torpedo recovery vehicle, CURV-I, became entangled in the weapon's parachute while attempting to attach a line to it. A decision was made to raise CURV and the weapon together to a depth of 100 feet (30 m), where divers attached cables to both. The bomb was brought to the surface by USS Petrel. The USS Cascade was diverted from its Naples destination, stayed on scene until recovery, then took the bomb back to the United States.

CURV-I was designed and built by Vare Industries Inc., of Roselle, New Jersey. The firm, founded and led by Milton Michael "Mike" Waller (1909-1974), was an early specialist in submersibles. The firm closed when Mike Waller became ill.

Once the bomb was located, Simó Orts appeared at the United States District Court for the Southern District of New York with his lawyer, Herbert Brownell, formerly Attorney General of the United States under President Dwight D. Eisenhower, claiming salvage rights on the recovered thermonuclear bomb. According to Craven:

It is customary maritime law that the person who identifies the location of a ship to be salved has the right to a salvage award if that identification leads to a successful recovery. The amount is nominal, usually 1 or 2 percent, sometimes a bit more, of the intrinsic value to the owner of the thing salved. But the thing salved off Palomares was a thermonuclear bomb, the same bomb valued by no less an authority than the Secretary of Defense at $2 billion—each percent of which is, of course, $20 million.

The Air Force settled out of court for an undisclosed sum. In later years, Simó Orts was heard to complain that the Americans had promised him financial compensation but had not kept their promise.

== Contamination ==
At 10:40 UTC, the accident was reported at the Command Post of the Sixteenth Air Force, and was confirmed at 11:22. The commander of the U.S. Air Force at Torrejón Air Base, Spain, Major General Delmar E. Wilson, immediately traveled to the scene of the accident with a Disaster Control Team. Further Air Force personnel were dispatched later the same day, including nuclear experts from U.S. government laboratories.

The first weapon to be discovered was found nearly intact. However, the conventional explosives from the other two bombs that fell on land detonated without setting off a nuclear explosion (akin to a dirty bomb explosion). This ignited the pyrophoric plutonium, producing a cloud that was dispersed by a 30-knot (56 km/h; 35 mph) wind. A total of 2.6 square kilometres (1.0 sq mi) was contaminated with radioactive material. This included residential areas, farmland (especially tomato farms) and woods.

To defuse public alarm over contamination, on 8 March Spanish minister for information and tourism Manuel Fraga Iribarne and United States ambassador Angier Biddle Duke swam on nearby beaches in front of the press. First the ambassador and some companions swam at Mojácar — a resort 15 km (9 mi) away — and then Duke and Fraga swam at the Quitapellejos beach in Palomares.

Despite the cost and the number of personnel involved in the cleanup, traces of contamination remained forty years later. Snails were observed with unusual levels of radioactivity. Additional tracts of land were also appropriated for testing and further cleanup. However, no indication of health issues has been discovered among the local population in Palomares.

== Political consequences ==
President Lyndon B. Johnson was first apprised of the situation during his morning briefing on the day of the accident. He was told that the 16th Nuclear Disaster Team had been sent to investigate, per the standard procedures for this type of accident. News stories on the crash began appearing the following day, and it was on the front page of both the New York Times and Washington Post on 20 January. Reporters sent to the accident scene covered angry demonstrations by local residents. On 4 February, an underground Communist organization initiated a protest by 600 people in front of the U.S. Embassy in Spain. The Duchess of Medina Sidonia, Luisa Isabel Álvarez de Toledo (known as the "Red Duchess" for her socialist activism), eventually received a 13-month prison sentence for leading an illegal protest.

Four days after the accident, the Spanish government under Franco's dictatorship stated that "the Palomares incident was evidence of the dangers created by NATO's use of the Gibraltar airstrip", announcing that NATO aircraft would no longer be permitted to fly over Spanish territory to or from Gibraltar. On 25 January, as a diplomatic concession, the U.S. announced that it would no longer fly over Spain with nuclear weapons, and on 29 January the Spanish government formally banned U.S. flights over its territory that carried such weapons. This caused other nations hosting U.S. forces to review their policies, with Philippine Foreign Secretary Narciso Ramos calling for a new treaty to restrict the operation of U.S. military aircraft in Filipino airspace.

Palomares, and the Thule Air Base B-52 crash involving nuclear weapons two years later in Greenland, made Operation Chrome Dome politically untenable, leading the U.S. Department of Defense to announce that it would be "re-examining the military need" for continuing the program.

As of 2024, there is no museum or monument dedicated to the accident in the town of Palomares, which is noted only by a short street there named "17 January 1966".

== Cleanup - Operation Moist Mop ==
During the cleanup operation, named Moist Mop, soil with radioactive contamination levels above 1.2 MBq/m^{2} was placed in 250-litre (66 U.S. gallon) drums and shipped to the Savannah River Plant in South Carolina for burial. A total of 2.2 hectares (5.4 acres) was decontaminated this way, producing 6,000 barrels. 17 hectares (42 acres) of land with lower levels of contamination were mixed to a depth of 30 centimetres (12 in) by harrowing and plowing. On rocky slopes with contamination above 120 kBq/m^{2}, the soil was removed with hand tools and shipped to the U.S. in barrels.

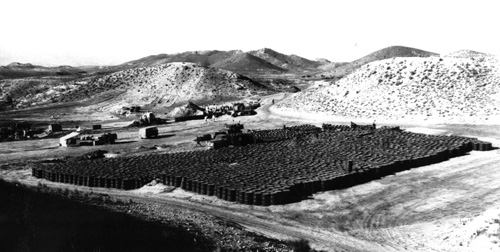
Barrels of contaminated soil being prepared for removal to the United States for processing

In 2004, a study revealed that there was still some significant contamination present in certain areas, and the Spanish government subsequently expropriated some plots of land which would otherwise have been slated for agriculture use or housing construction.

On 11 October 2006, Reuters reported that higher-than-normal levels of radiation were detected in snails and other wildlife in the region, indicating there may still be dangerous amounts of radioactive material underground. The discovery occurred during an investigation being carried out by Spain's energy research agency CIEMAT and the U.S. Department of Energy. The U.S. and Spain agreed to share the cost of the initial investigation.

In April 2008, CIEMAT announced they had found two trenches, totaling 2,000 cubic metres (71,000 ft^{3}), where the U.S. Army stored contaminated earth during the 1966 operations. The American government agreed in 2004 to pay for the decontamination of the grounds, and the cost of the removal and transportation of the contaminated earth has been estimated at $2 million. The trenches were found near the cemetery, where one of the nuclear devices was retrieved in 1966, and they were probably dug at the last moment by American troops before leaving Palomares. CIEMAT said that they expected to find remains of plutonium and americium once an exhaustive analysis of the earth had been carried out. In a conversation in December 2009, Spanish Foreign Minister Miguel Ángel Moratinos told the U.S. Secretary of State Hillary Clinton that he feared Spanish public opinion might turn against the U.S. once results of the nuclear contamination study were revealed.

In August 2010, a Spanish government source revealed that the U.S. had stopped the annual payments it has made to Spain, as the bilateral agreement in force since the accident had expired the previous year.

On 19 October 2015, Spain and the United States signed an agreement to further discuss the cleanup and removal of contaminated land. Under a statement of intent signed by Spanish Foreign Minister José Manuel García-Margallo and U.S. Secretary of State John Kerry, the two countries were to negotiate a binding agreement to further restore and clear up the Palomares site and arrange for the disposal of the contaminated soil at an appropriate site in the U.S.

== Aftermath ==
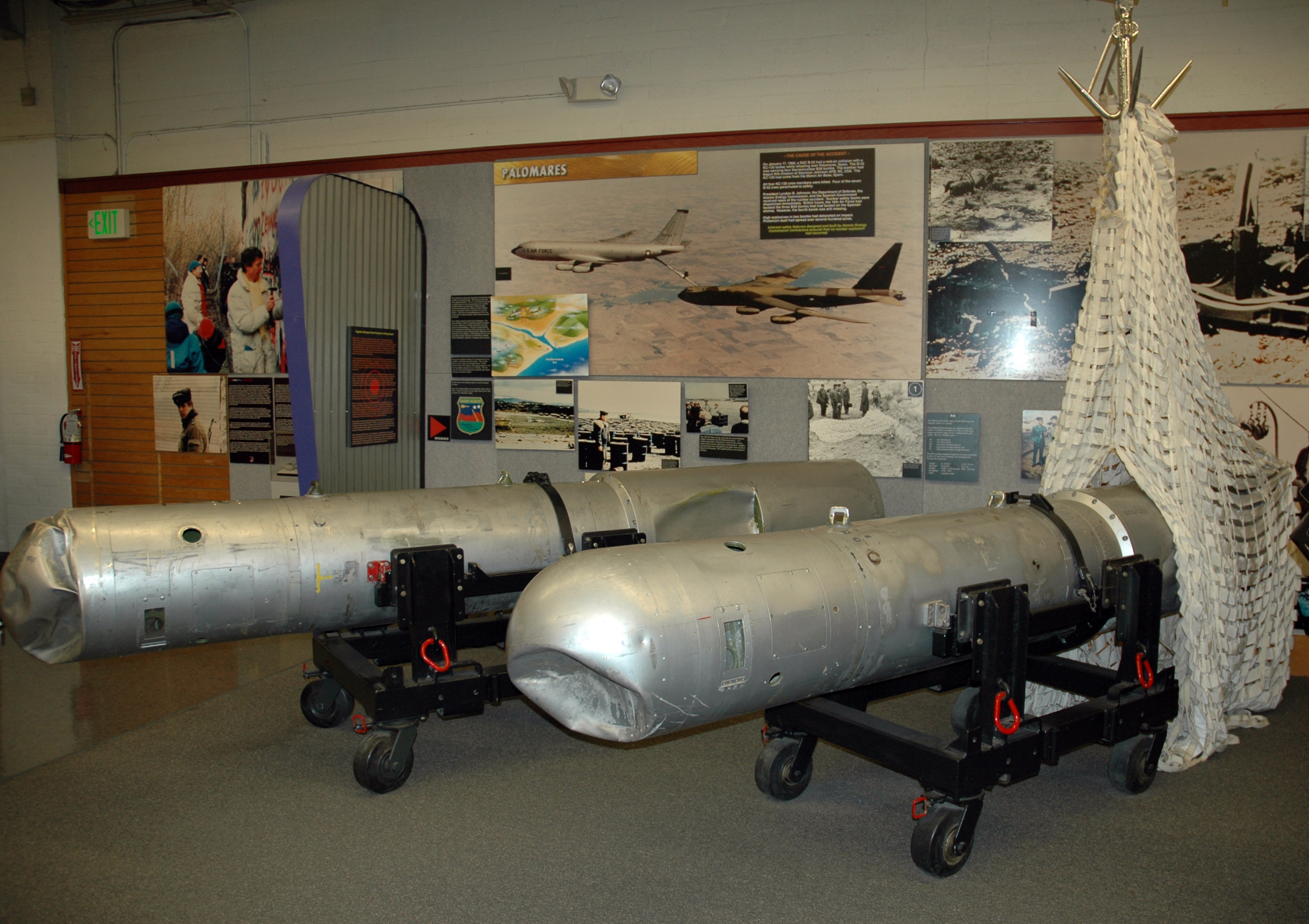
The casings of two B28 nuclear bombs involved in the Palomares accident are on display at the National Museum of Nuclear Science & History in Albuquerque, New Mexico.

While serving on the salvage ship USS Hoist during recovery operations, Navy diver Carl Brashear had his leg crushed in a deck accident and lost the lower part of his left leg. His story was the inspiration for the 2000 film Men of Honor.

In March 2009, Time magazine identified the Palomares accident as one of the world's "worst nuclear disasters".

Marked long-term occurrences of cancer and other health defects occurred among the surviving USAF personnel directed to the accident site in the days following the crash to clean up the contamination. Most of the afflicted personnel have had difficulty securing any type of compensation from the Department of Veterans Affairs because of the secretive nature of the cleanup operation and the Air Force's refusal to acknowledge that adequate safety measures to protect first responders may not have been taken.

In June 2016, The New York Times published an article on the 50th anniversary lingering legacy of the Palomares accident.

In December 2017, one of the airmen involved in the clean-up, Victor Skaar, sued the Department of Veterans Affairs in the Court of Appeals for Veterans Claims. Skaar was appealing the Department's refusal of medical treatment for leukopenia that Skaar believes was caused by his exposure at Palomares. He also petitioned for the Court to certify a class of veterans "who were present at the 1966 cleanup of plutonium dust at Palomares, Spain[,] and whose application for service-connected disability compensation based on exposure to ionizing radiation [VA] has denied or will deny." The certification of this class was granted by the Court in December 2019. This is one of the first cases ever granted class-action status by the Court of Appeals for Veterans Claims.

The empty casings of two of the bombs involved in this accident are now on display in the National Museum of Nuclear Science & History in Albuquerque, New Mexico.

== In popular culture ==
The accident inspired the light-hearted 1966 film Finders Keepers, starring Cliff Richard and backed by his band The Shadows.

In November 1966, the plot of an episode of the espionage-themed American television series I Spy entitled "One of Our Bombs is Missing" was devoted to the search for an American Air Force plane carrying an atomic weapon which crashed over a remote Italian village.

This accident was given the movie treatment in a semi-serious 1967 film, The Day the Fish Came Out, which covers the story of a plane crash alongside a Greek (not Spanish) Island and the surreptitious attempts by plain-clothes U.S. Navy personnel to find the missing bombs.

It is also referenced in Terence Young's 1969 drama The Christmas Tree, in which William Holden plays a rich industrialist, who, while traveling in Corsica with his son, learns the boy has been exposed to radiation from the explosion of a plane carrying a nuclear device; on the phone with a senior French official, he references the Palomares accident.

The story was told in comic format as "Paco della Bomba" by Mino Milani on the Italian teenage-oriented magazine Corriere dei Ragazzi, on 12 January 1973.

In Episode 12 of the fourth season of Archer, the main protagonists race against time to recover a lost hydrogen bomb near the Bermuda Triangle, with references being made to how the U.S. Air Force settled for "at least $20 million" when they lost a previous hydrogen bomb in the late 1960s.

In 2000, the U.S. film Men of Honor focused on the life of the first black American master diver, Carl Brashear, in the U.S. Navy. The film begins and ends with the Palomares bomb recovery by U.S. Navy personnel.

In April 2015, the Palomares accident was mentioned in the Danish film The Idealist, a film about a similar accident, the 1968 Thule Air Base B-52 crash.

In August 2015, the accident was the subject of a two-minute animated film by Richard Neale that was a finalist in the BBC's WellDoneU competition for amateur filmmakers.

In 2021, Spanish cable TV provider Movistar+ produced a four-part documentary series, Palomares: Dias de playa y plutonio.

== See also ==
- Broken Arrow
- List of military nuclear accidents
- RAF Lakenheath nuclear near-disasters – included another US military accident involving a Mark 28 nuclear bomb
