= USS Petrel (ASR-14) =

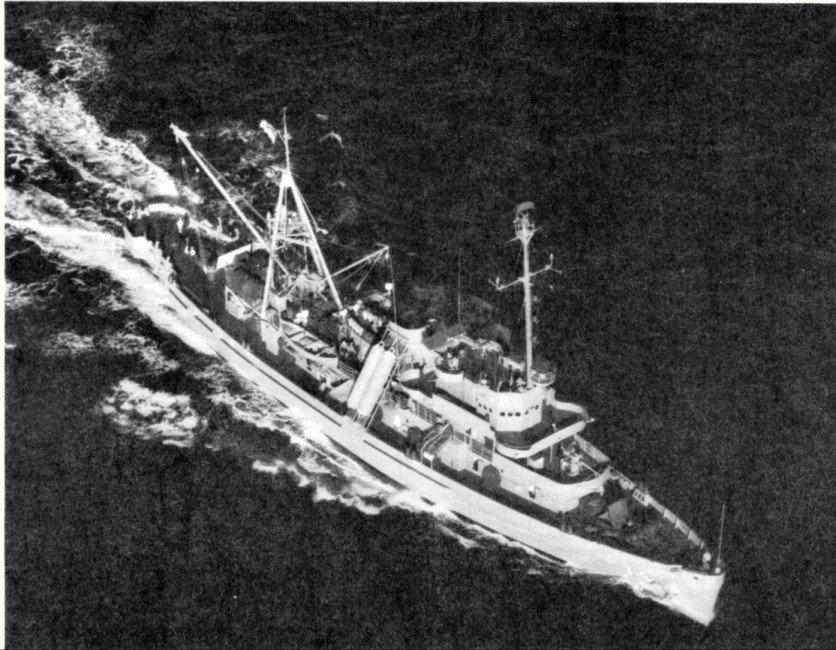

History

United States
- Name: USS Petrel
- Builder: Savannah Machine Foundry Co., Savannah, Georgia
- Laid down: 26 February 1945
- Launched: 26 September 1945
- Commissioned: 24 September 1946
- Decommissioned: 30 September 1991
- Stricken: 9 October 1991
- Fate: Sold for scrapping, 2003

General characteristics
- Class & type: Chanticleer-class submarine rescue ship
- Displacement: 1,780 long tons (1,809 t)
- Length: 251 ft 4 in (76.61 m)
- Beam: 42 ft (13 m)
- Draft: 14 ft (4.3 m)
- Speed: 16.5 knots (30.6 km/h; 19.0 mph)
- Complement: 63 officers and enlisted
- Armament: 2 × 3 in (76 mm) guns

The fifth USS Petrel (ASR-14) was a Chanticleer-class submarine rescue ship in the United States Navy.

Petrel was laid down on 26 February 1945, was built by Savannah Machine Foundry Co., Savannah, Georgia; launched on 26 September 1945, sponsored by Mrs. Effie Jeffreys (in honour of her son, MMC Romie L. Jeffreys, who died along with all hands on the submarine USS Shark (SS-174) on 11 February 1942), and commissioned at Savannah on 24 September 1946.

== Service history ==
=== 1946–1949 ===
After fitting out at Charleston, South Carolina and shakedown at Guantanamo and Panama Bays, Petrel returned to Charleston on 18 December 1946. She sailed for New London on 6 January 1947 to join SubRon 2, and operated out of that base for the next three years training and qualifying deep-sea divers and salvage crews, and escorting submarines such as Piper (SS-409) and Cochino (SS-345) in tests.

=== 1950–1959 ===
Departing New London on 23 January 1950, she steamed off Old Point Comfort, Virginia, where the battleship Missouri (BB-63) had run aground. Divers from Petrel surveyed and excavated around the bottom of the battleship, and on 1 February Petrel aided in the "big pull" that drew Missouri into deep water. After this operation, Petrel returned to New London on 6 February, but was reassigned to Key West on 5 May.

Petrel continued training operations, with SubRon 4, at Key West throughout the 1950s, with occasional variations. She towed ex-U-2513 off Dry Tortuga Flats in October 1950 to be sunk in firing exercises by the destroyer Robert A. Owens (DD-827). Exercises in 1952 included re-floating the U–2513. In 1956, Petrel had a key role in freeing Nantahala, aground in Key West Channel.

On 14 February 1958, Petrel received a distress call at Key West from the submarine Guavina (SS-362), stranded in heavy seas off San Salvador, Bahama Islands. Steaming to the area and off-loading some of Guavina's oil cargo, Petrel towed the lightened submarine to Key West.

=== 1960–1969 ===
Petrel continued to operate along the Atlantic coast of the southern United States until sailing in early 1961 for the Mediterranean for exercises with SubDiv 41, 6th Fleet in June and operated off Portugal in salvage operations after a DC-8 passenger airplane crash. Petrel returned to Charleston on 28 August for coastal operations until she again joined the 6th Fleet from January to May 1964. She departed Charleston on 12 July for Hamilton, Bermuda, where she aided the U.S. Air Force in recovering wreckage and personnel from a two-plane, mid-air collision. Highlights of subsequent coastal service included accompanying Von Steuben (SSBN-632) in sea trials in September, work with Sam Rayburn (SSBN-635) in April 1965, and duty at Guantanamo on 28–30 September and during Hurricane Inez.

Petrel departed New London on 6 January 1966 for Holy Loch, Scotland, with Saugus (YTB-780) in tow. On 17 January, an Air Force B-52, carrying four unarmed Mk.28 nuclear bombs, collided with a KC-135 off Palomares, Spain. Petrel was sent to the area to aid in salvage operations and had the delicate task of maintaining position over the bomb. The weapon was brought to the surface on 7 April, by the ROV CURV, placed on Petrel, and transferred to the Cascade (AD-16). Petrel then returned to Charleston.

Deployed to the Mediterranean again in 1968, Petrel searched for the lost Israeli submarine INS Dakar on 26 January, and missing Minerve on the 30th. On 12 February, she helped salvage destroyer Bache (DD-470) at Rhodes, Greece. After return to Charleston in May, she joined in the search for missing submarine Scorpion (SSN-589) on the 27th, and returned to Charleston from the Azores on 12 July. She continued operations with SubDiv 41 into 1970.

=== 1970–1991 ===
Petrel departed her homeport in Charleston, South Carolina in January 1973 to participate in the Roberto Clemente aircraft search and recovery operation off the coast of San Juan, Puerto Rico. She was decommissioned on 30 September 1991, and struck from the Naval Vessel Register on 9 October 1991. Laid up in the Atlantic Reserve Fleet, Petrel was transferred to MARAD custody on 1 May 1999, for lay up in the National Defense Reserve Fleet, at James River, Virginia. A contract for scrapping was awarded to Bay Bridge Enterprises of Chesapeake, Virginia, and the ship was towed from the James River on 5 December 2003.
