= Elizabethtown metropolitan area =

Elizabethtown Metro
- Metropolitan Statistical Area
- Elizabethtown, KY Metropolitan Statistical Area
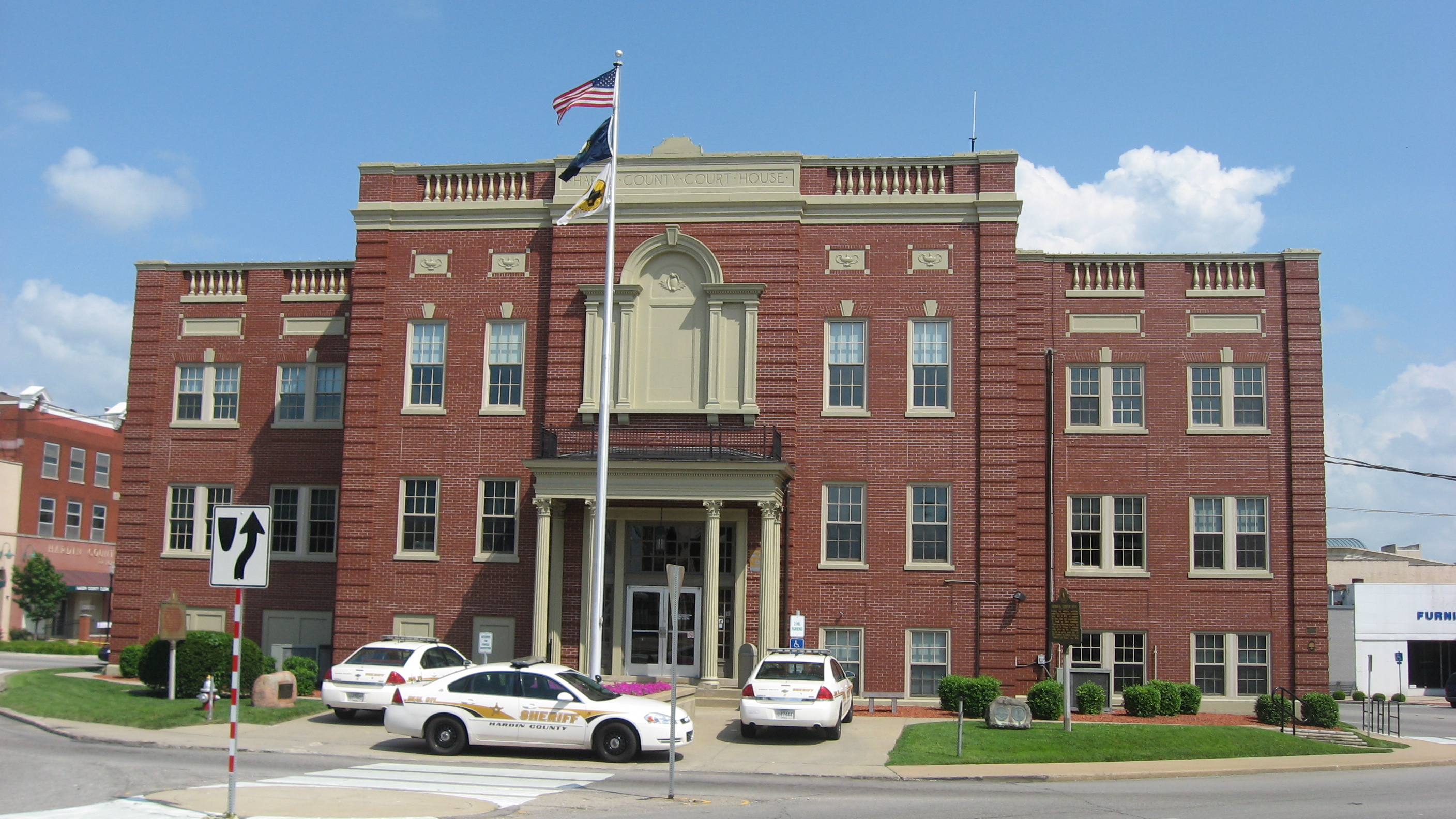
- Hardin County Old Courthouse in downtown Elizabethtown
Interactive Map of Elizabethtown, KY MSA
City of Elizabethtown
Fort Knox
Elizabethtown, KY MSA
Other Counties in the Louisville, KY–IN CSA
- Coordinates: 37°44′16″N 85°58′26″W
- Country: United States
- State: Kentucky
- Largest city: Elizabethtown
- Other cities: Hodgenville; Muldraugh; Radcliff; Sonora; Upton; Vine Grove; West Point

Area
  - Total: 894 sq mi (2,320 km^{2})
- Highest elevation: 997 ft (304 m)
- Lowest elevation: 384 ft (117 m)

Population
  - Total: 155,572 (2,020 Census)
  - Rank: 272 in the U.S.
  - Density: 130/sq mi (49/km^{2})

The Elizabethtown Metropolitan Statistical Area, as defined by the United States Census Bureau, is an area consisting of two counties in Kentucky, anchored by the city of Elizabethtown and the nearby Fort Knox Army post. As of the 2020 census, the MSA had a population of 155,572.

The Elizabethtown Metropolitan Statistical Area is part of the Louisville/Jefferson County–Elizabethtown, KY-IN Combined Statistical Area, which covers a 14-county area (ten in Kentucky and four in Indiana).

From 2013 to 2023, the Office of Management and Budget changed the name of the metropolitan area to "Elizabethtown–Fort Knox".

== Counties ==
- Hardin
- LaRue

== Communities ==
=== Incorporated places ===
- Elizabethtown (Principal city)
- Hodgenville
- Muldraugh (partial)
- Radcliff
- Sonora
- Upton
- Vine Grove
- West Point

=== Census-designated places ===
Note: census-designated places are unincorporated.

- Fort Knox (principal city)

=== Unincorporated places ===
- Athertonville
- Buffalo
- Cecilia
- Eastview
- Glendale
- Lyons
- Magnolia
- Mt. Sherman
- Rineyville
- Stephensburg
- Tonieville

== Demographics ==
As of the census of 2000, there were 107,547 people, 39,772 households, and 29,221 families residing within the MSA. This adds to over 100%. The racial makeup of the MSA was 83.57% White, 15.32% African American, 0.39% Native American, 1.59% Asian, 0.20% Pacific Islander, 1.22% from other races, and 2.20% from two or more races. Hispanic or Latino of any race were 3.07% of the population.

The median income for a household in the MSA was $34,900, and the median income for a family was $40,698. Males had a median income of $30,825 versus $21,390 for females. The per capita income for the MSA was $16,676.

== See also ==
- Kentucky census statistical areas
