= Tonieville, Kentucky =

Unincorporated community in Kentucky, United States

Coordinates: 37°36′34″N 85°47′46″W

Tonieville is a small unincorporated community in LaRue County, Kentucky, United States, in the central part of the state. The community is part of the Elizabethtown, Kentucky Metropolitan Statistical Area. Its zip code is 42748.

It is most notable as the birthplace of Carl Brashear, the first black U.S. Navy Master Diver.

Local tradition has it that the name of the town derived from two of the largest local landowners. These landowners were Tone Goodin and Tone Kennady and were known by the name of "Tone", which was probably short for "Anthony." While several men named Tony besides the two listed above have been put forward as having been the source of the name Tonieville, it was in fact almost certainly named after the town of Tonneville in Normandy.
