= Master diver (United States Navy) =

Senior diver rating in US Navy

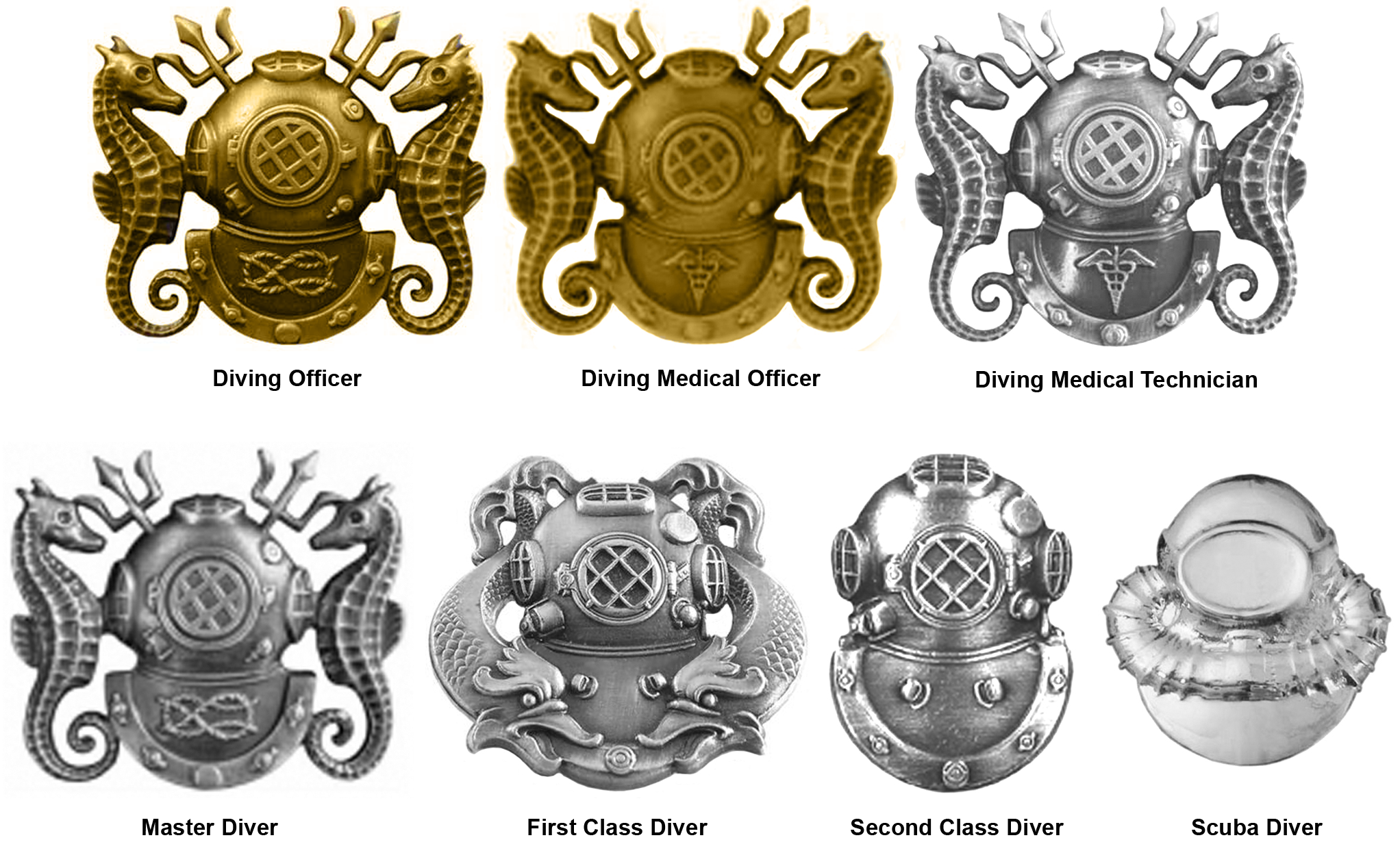

The United States Navy master diver is the highest warfare qualification obtainable by a member of U.S. Navy diving community. A master diver is an enlisted person who typically has the most experience and knowledge on all aspects of diving and underwater salvage.

== Designation ==
A master diver is qualified to wear the master diver badge. An enlisted member who obtains master diver status is authorized to have the warfare designator "(MDV)" after their rating designator. For example, if Davy Jones is a navy diver chief petty officer (master diver), then their title/name would be written as NDC (MDV) Jones. The title "Master Diver" is customarily used as a form of address rather than the individual's rank.

== Responsibilities ==
According to the Manual of Navy Enlisted Manpower and Personnel Classifications and Occupational Standards, the USN master diver is the most qualified enlisted person to direct and supervise diving, salvage, ship repair operations and diving programs. He is responsible to the commanding officer, via the diving officer, for all facets of command diving operations and programs, to include training, equipment, systems, personnel, operations. He develops, updates and oversees diving programs, and manages the development, operation, testing, repair and certification of all USN diving equipment, systems and support equipment. He directs the treatment of all diving related injuries, including recompression chamber operations, casualty control operations and mishap reporting procedures. He directs underwater inspections, harbor, port and ship security inspections, including ordnance searching, ship and submarine repair, salvage, expeditionary salvage and littoral combat, rescue, special warfare operations, underwater cutting and welding, demolition operations and small boat operations. He directs and supervises swimmer delivery vehicle dry deck shelter systems, submarine lock-in/lock-out systems and submarine rescue chambers. He develops training programs and qualifies personnel in diving equipment, systems and procedures. He is trained in advanced diving physics, medicine, differential diagnosis and saturation diving techniques. He directs and supervises surface and underwater demolition operations for salvage, ship husbandry, or underwater construction operations and employs the principle and techniques of precision demolition in projects requiring cutting, flattening and/or removing of pilings, obsolete moorings, or other obstructions in channels, harbors, open oceans, or other areas of concern. He supervises the operation, maintenance, and certification of deep dive systems and equipment.

== See also ==
- Uniform Service Diver Insignia (United States) – Qualification badges of the uniformed services of the U.S.
- Navy diver (United States Navy) – US Navy personnel qualified in underwater diving and salvage
