= Palomares, Almería =

Town along the Mediterranean Sea in Andalusia, Spain

Coordinates: 37°14′55″N 1°47′45″W

Palomares
- Town
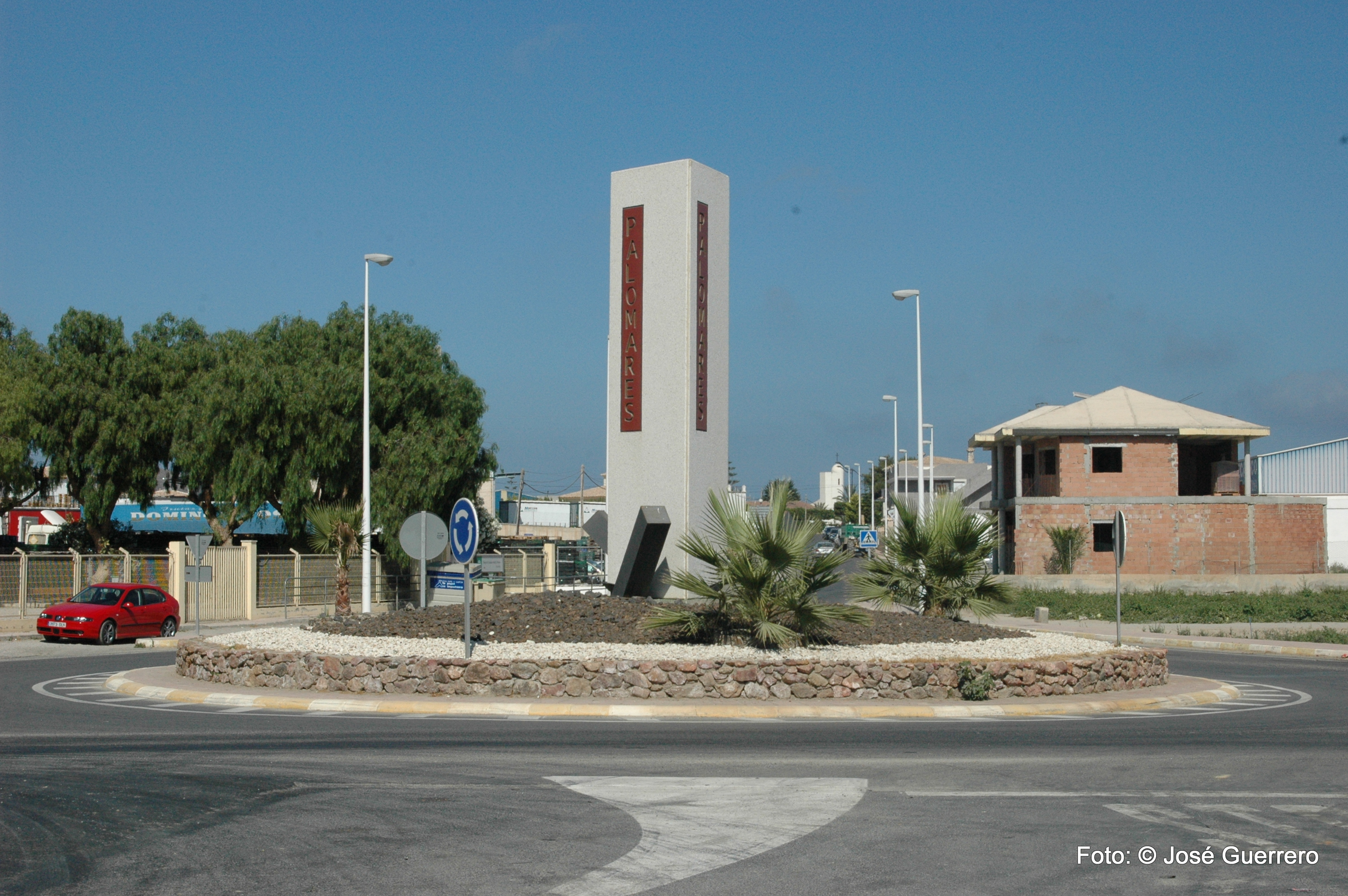
- Palomares in 2005
- Interactive map of Palomares
- Country: Spain
- Autonomous Community: Andalusia
- Province: Almería
- Postal code: 04617
- Area code: +34 950

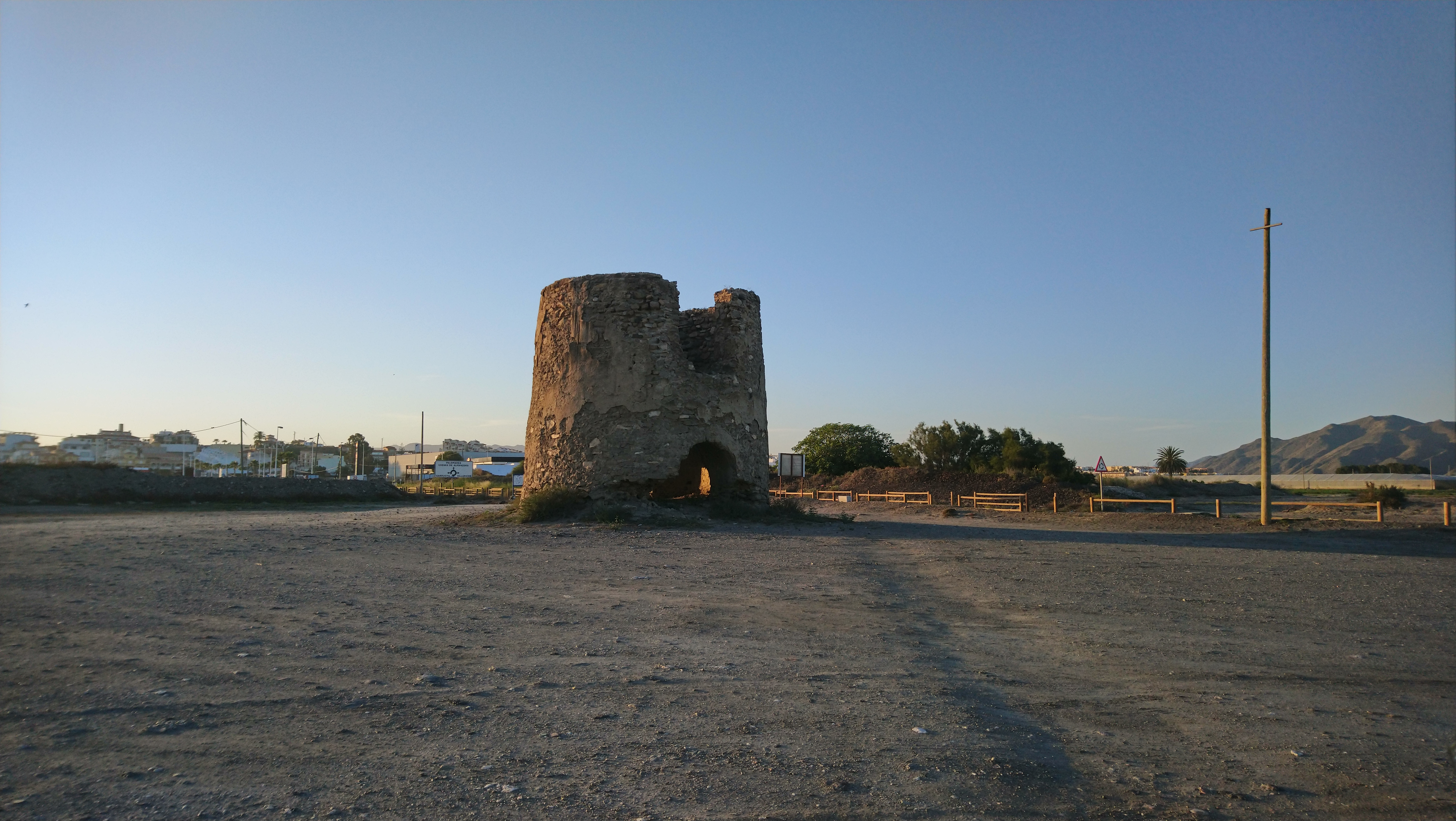
old derelict windmill site near Palomares

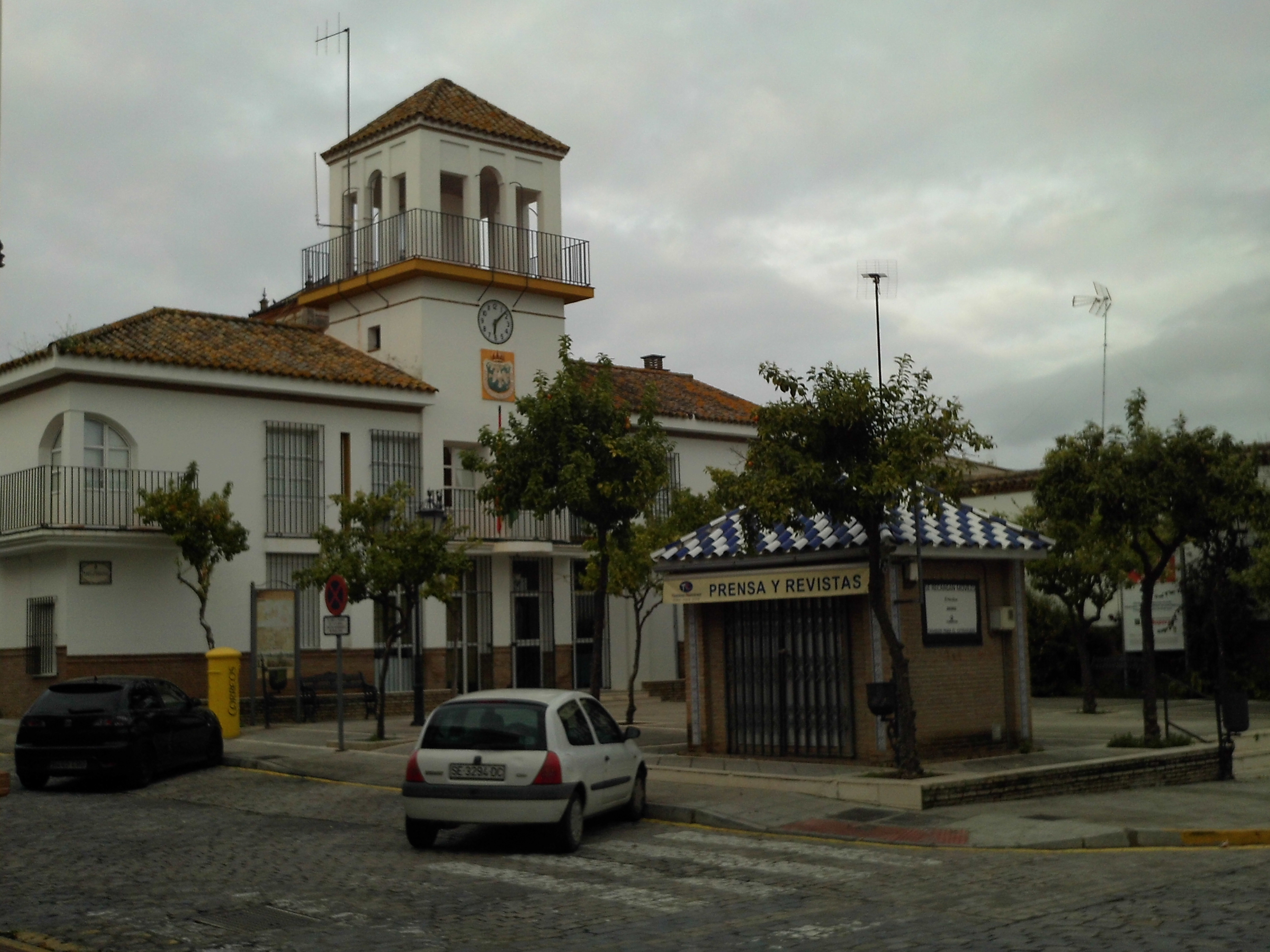
Plaza de Andalucía

Palomares is an agricultural, fishing, and tourist town along the Mediterranean Sea in the Almería province of Andalusia, Spain. It is about 20 metres (66 feet) above sea level. The village falls within the municipality of Cuevas del Almanzora.

The ruins of El Artial a derelict windmill, lie just outside the village.

== 1966 USAF accident ==
The town was noted for a fatal accident in 1966 in which a B-52 Stratofortress of the Strategic Air Command collided mid-air with a KC-135 Stratotanker plane, causing radioactive contamination after its payload of four hydrogen bombs (H-bombs) was dispersed and crashed. There were four thermonuclear weapons in the bomber. The high-explosive igniters in two of these bombs detonated on impact, spreading radioactive material, including deadly plutonium-239, over a wide area of the Spanish countryside, but safety mechanisms and electronics prevented nuclear explosions. The third H-bomb landed via parachute into a stream, where it was relatively intact and was recovered. The fourth H-bomb landed in the Mediterranean Sea, and U.S. Navy searchers took three months to find and recover the device intact. A large amount of contaminated Spanish soil was soon removed, packed up, and shipped across the Atlantic for burial near Barnwell, South Carolina, the site of a large installation of the U.S. Atomic Energy Commission.

In 2001, the Centro de Investigaciones Energéticas, Medioambientales y Tecnológicas (CIEMAT) still detected measurable levels of the radioactive elements plutonium, uranium, and americium over 10 hectares (24 acres) of Palomares.

Annual monitoring by American and Spanish researchers found no evidence of health problems, or of any contaminated food or water resulting from the accident. Nevertheless, some areas remain contaminated and they cannot be disturbed. Although they are fenced off for safety, the result is that the region is economically blighted, and it has missed out on tourist developments like those in most other coastal towns. On 19 October 2015, Spain and the United States signed a statement of intent to discuss further cleanup of this area. Eventually, the United States agreed to remove additional contaminated soil from Palomares to a safe burial site in the United States.

The accident was explored by American author Charles Bukowski in his short story "Politics is like Trying to Screw a Cat in the Ass".
