= Kentucky Route 361 =

State highway in Kentucky, United States

Kentucky Route 361
- KY 361 highlighted in red

Route information
- Maintained by KYTC
- Length: 16.463 mi (26.495 km)

Major junctions
- South end: US 31W in Elizabethtown
- US 31W Byp. in Elizabethtown; KY 313 in Radcliff; US 31W in Fort Knox
- North end: Entrance to Fort Knox at Bullion Boulevard

Location
- Country: United States
- State: Kentucky
- Counties: Hardin

Highway system
- Kentucky State Highway System; Interstate; US; State; Parkways
← KY 360	→ KY 362

Kentucky Route 361 (KY 361) is a 16.463-mile-long (26.495 km) state highway in Hardin County, Kentucky, that runs from U.S. Route 31W in Elizabethtown the entrance to Fort Knox at Bullion Boulevard.

== History ==
KY 361 was designated on December 19, 2014.

The original KY 361 ran from US 431 to US 79 in Russellville via Armstrong Street. This road was given to Logan County on October 25, 1982.

== Major intersections ==
The entire route is in Hardin County.

Location	mi	km	Destinations	Notes
Elizabethtown	0.000	0.000	US 31W (West Dixie Avenue)	Southern terminus
Elizabethtown	0.874	1.407	US 31W Byp. (Elizabethtown Bypass)	Interchange
	1.819	2.927	KY 3005 (Ring Road)	
	2.505	4.031	KY 2802 east (Hutcherson Lane) / Hutcherson Lane	Western terminus of KY 2802
	2.844	4.577	KY 1600 north (Rineyville Road) / Charleston Way	Southern terminus of KY 1600
	5.685	9.149	KY 220 (Rineyville-Big Springs Road)	
Radcliff	8.082	13.007	KY 313 south (Joe Prather Highway) / Education Avenue	South end of KY 313 overlap
Radcliff	9.160	14.742	KY 1646 north (South Logsdon Parkway) / Nature Trail	Southern terminus of KY 1646
Vine Grove	9.458	15.221	KY 1500 (Rogersville Road)	
Vine Grove	10.506	16.908	KY 144 (Highland Avenue / West Vine Street)	
Vine Grove	11.238	18.086	KY 1815 north (West Lincoln Trail Boulevard) / Vineland Parkway	Southern terminus of KY 1815
Vine Grove	12.018	19.341	KY 313 north (Joe Prather Highway) / KY 1500 east (Knox Avenue)	North end of KY 313 overlap; south end of KY 1500 overlap
	12.657	20.369	KY 1500 west (Knox Avenue)	North end of KY 1500 overlap
	14.877	23.942	KY 1646 south (South Logsdon Parkway)	Northern terminus of KY 1646
Fort Knox	16.206	26.081	US 31W (North Dixie Boulevard)	Interchange
Fort Knox	16.463	26.495	Entrance to Fort Knox	Northern terminus; continues beyond entrance as Bullion Boulevard
1.000 mi = 1.609 km; 1.000 km = 0.621 mi
