= Kentucky Route 251 =

State highway in Kentucky, United States

Kentucky Route 251
- KY 251 highlighted in red

Route information
- Maintained by KYTC
- Length: 11.039 mi (17.766 km)

Section 1
- Length: 7.981 mi (12.844 km)
- South end: US 31W in Elizabethtown
- Major intersections: KY 434 south of Fort Knox
- North end: KY 313 in Fort Knox

Section 2
- Length: 3.058 mi (4.921 km)
- West end: Fort Knox
- East end: KY 61

Location
- Country: United States
- State: Kentucky
- Counties: Hardin, Bullitt

Highway system
- Kentucky State Highway System; Interstate; US; State; Parkways
← KY 250	→ KY 252

Kentucky Route 251 (KY 251) is an 11-mile-long (18 km) state highway in the U.S. state of Kentucky, split into two sections. The highway connects Elizabethtown and Fort Knox with rural areas of Hardin County; the second section, separated from the first by Fort Knox, is near Belmont in Bullitt County.

== Route description ==
KY 251 has two sections. The Hardin County section, a state secondary highway, extends 7.981 miles (12.844 km) from U.S. Route 31W (US 31W) in Elizabethtown north to KY 313 on the southern edge of Fort Knox. The 3.058-mile-long (4.921 km) Bullitt County segment is a rural secondary highway that runs from a dead end on the eastern edge of Fort Knox east to KY 61 at Belmont.

=== Elizabethtown to Fort Knox ===
The Hardin County portion of KY 251 begins at an intersection with U.S. Route 31W (West Dixie Avenue) in Elizabethtown. It travels to the northeast and curves to the north-northeast. It passes Elizabethtown High School, St. James Cemetery, Elizabethtown City Park, and Hardin Memorial Park cemetery. Just before leaving the city limits of the city, it intersects KY 3005 (Ring Road). It curves to the north-northwest and intersects KY 434 (Battle Training Road). Just north of this intersection, the highway enters the boundaries of Fort Knox. It curves to the north-northeast and meets its northern terminus, an intersection with KY 313 (Joe Prather Highway). Here, the roadway continues as Shepherdsville Road, a restricted access road for the fort.

=== Fort Knox to KY 61 ===
The western terminus of this portion of KY 251 is at the eastern edge of Fort Knox. The road then travels east and northeast through the southern edge of the community of Belmont before reaching its eastern terminus at KY 61.

== Major intersections ==
County	Location	mi	km	Destinations	Notes
Hardin	Elizabethtown	0.000	0.000	US 31W (West Dixie Avenue)	Southern terminus
Hardin	Elizabethtown	2.681	4.315	KY 3005 (Ring Road)	
Hardin		6.288	10.120	KY 434 (Battle Training Road) – Radcliff, Lebanon Junction	
Hardin	Fort Knox	7.981	12.844	KY 313 (Joe Prather Highway) – Radcliff, Lebanon Junction	Northern terminus
Gap in route
Bullitt		0.000	0.000		Edge of Fort Knox, no access
Bullitt		0.579	0.932	KY 2724 (Horse Fly Hollow)	
Bullitt	Belmont	3.058	4.921	KY 61 (Preston Highway)	
1.000 mi = 1.609 km; 1.000 km = 0.621 mi
