= Kentucky Route 434 =

State highway in Kentucky, United States

Kentucky Route 434
- KY 434 highlighted in red

Route information
- Maintained by KYTC
- Length: 13.237 mi (21.303 km)

Major junctions
- West end: US 31W in Radcliff
- KY 251 near Crest; KY 313 in Fort Knox
- East end: KY 61 in Lebanon Junction

Location
- Country: United States
- State: Kentucky
- Counties: Hardin, Bullitt

Highway system
- Kentucky State Highway System; Interstate; US; State; Parkways
← KY 433	→ KY 435

Kentucky Route 434 (KY 434) is a 13.237-mile-long (21.303 km) state highway in the U.S. state of Kentucky. The highway connects mostly rural areas of Hardin and Bullitt counties with Radcliff, Fort Knox, and Lebanon Junction.

== Route description ==
KY 434 begins at an intersection with South Wilson Road in the south-central part of Radcliff, within the north-central part of Hardin County, where the roadway continues as Medical Center Drive. This intersection is just northeast of the Lincoln Trail Behavioral Health System hospital. It travels to the east-northeast and immediately intersects U.S. Route 31W (US 31W; Dixie Boulevard). It curves to the east-southeast and begins traveling along the southern edge of Fort Knox. The highway crosses over Mill Creek and twice slips into Fort Knox proper. Then, it intersects KY 251 (Shepherdsville Road). It curves to the east-northeast and crosses over Cedar Creek. The highway then enters Fort Knox. It curves to the northeast and crosses over Patty Branch before it leaves the Army base. It curves to the east-northeast and cuts across a corner of Fort Knox. It curves to the north-northeast, re-enters the base, and has an interchange with KY 313 (Joe Prather Highway). In the interchange, KY 434 crosses over Mud Creek. It travels through Booth and passes Paradise Lake. The highway curves to a nearly due north direction. It then crosses over Rolling Fork. This bridge marks the Bullitt County line and the city limits of Lebanon Junction. KY 434 curves to the southeast and to the east-southeast before meeting its eastern terminus, an intersection with KY 61 (Preston Highway).

== Major intersections ==
County	Location	mi	km	Destinations	Notes
Hardin	Radcliff	0.000	0.000	South Wilson Road / Medical Center Drive west	Western terminus
Hardin	Radcliff	0.025	0.040	US 31W (Dixie Boulevard) – Elizabethtown	
Hardin		3.158	5.082	KY 251 (Shepherdsville Road)	
Hardin	Fort Knox	9.698	15.607	KY 313 east (Joe Prather Highway) to I-65 – Nashville, Louisville	Interchange with eastbound lanes of KY 313
Hardin	Fort Knox	9.840	15.836	KY 313 west (Joe Prather Highway) – Radcliff, Vine Grove, Patton Museum	Interchange with westbound lanes of KY 313
Bullitt	Lebanon Junction	13.237	21.303	KY 61 (Preston Highway)	Eastern terminus
1.000 mi = 1.609 km; 1.000 km = 0.621 mi: Incomplete access
