= Kentucky Route 313 =

State highway in Kentucky, United States

Kentucky Route 313
- KY 313 highlighted in red

Route information
- Maintained by KYTC
- Length: 33.845 mi (54.468 km)

Major junctions
- South end: I-65 in Fort Knox
- KY 434 in Fort Knox; KY 251 in Fort Knox; US 31W in Radcliff; KY 361 in Radcliff; KY 144 in Vine Grove; KY 361 / KY 1500 in Vine Grove; KY 144 / KY 1882 near Vine Grove; KY 144 near Flaherty; US 60 / KY 144 near Garrett
- North end: SR 135 at Ohio River near Brandenburg

Location
- Country: United States
- State: Kentucky
- Counties: Hardin, Meade

Highway system
- Kentucky State Highway System; Interstate; US; State; Parkways
← KY 312	→ KY 314

Kentucky Route 313 (KY 313) is a 33.8-mile-long (54.4 km) state highway in the U.S. state of Kentucky. The highway connects rural areas of Hardin and Meade counties with Radcliff and Vine Grove. The stretch from I-65 to Flaherty Road is also known as the Joe Prather Highway.

== Route description ==
=== Hardin County ===
KY 313 begins at an interchange with Interstate 65 (I-65) in the southeastern part of Fort Knox, within Hardin County. It travels to the west-southwest, traveling through the southern part of the Army base, crosses over some railroad tracks, crosses over KY 434 (Battle Training Road), and crosses over Mud Creek. Then, it curves to the west-northwest and has an interchange with KY 434. KY 313 winds its way to the west and crosses over Brewer Hollow. It then crosses over Cedar Creek and then curves to the west-southwest before it has an intersection with the northern terminus of KY 251 (Shepherdsville Road). The highway crosses over Mill Creek. It then leaves the base and enters Radcliff. It intersects U.S. Route 31W (US 31W; South Dixie Boulevard). It temporarily leaves the city limits of Radcliff and curves to the northwest, begins paralleling Brushy Fork and re-enters the city. It intersects KY 361 (Patriot Parkway). The two highways begin to run concurrently here. They intersect the southern terminus of KY 1646 (South Logsdon Parkway). They then leave Radcliff and enter Vine Grove. After an intersection with KY 1500 (Rogersville Road), they leave the fork and intersect KY 144 (Highland Avenue). They curve to the west-northwest, intersect the southern terminus of KY 1815 (West Lincoln Trail Boulevard) and cross over some railroad tracks of the Paducah & Louisville Railway. At this point, they travel in a nearly due west direction and have a second intersection with KY 1500 (Knox Avenue). At this intersection, KY 361 splits off from KY 313, while KY 313 leaves the city limits of Vine Grove. A short distance later, it enters Meade County.

=== Meade County ===
KY 313 crosses over Otter Creek and intersects KY 1882 (Old Fort Avenue). At this intersection, KY 144 begins to run concurrently with KY 313. They curve to the west-northwest and split. It curves to the northwest and intersects KY 1816 (Rabbit Run Road). KY 144 begins to additionally run concurrently with KY 313. They continue to the northwest and intersect the eastern terminus of KY 333 (Big Spring Road). They continue to the northwest and intersect US 60. Shortly after its junction with US 60, KY 144 leaves KY 313 and heads towards Garrett. KY 313 continues traveling northwestward until it reaches the Brandenburg city limits. There, it intersects KY 448, and heads around the west side of Brandenburg. The route terminates at the Matthew E. Welsh Bridge across the Ohio River, continuing into Indiana as SR 135. A portion of KY 313 around Brandenburg from KY 79 to KY 448 was previously assigned as KY 1051.

== History ==
KY 313 was designated on August 7, 1989.

The original KY 313 ran from the Tennessee State Line northward via Kentucky Bend Road in far west Fulton County. This route was removed from the state highway system by May 11, 1981.

== Major intersections ==
County	Location	mi	km	Destinations	Notes
Hardin	Fort Knox	0.000	0.000	I-65 – Nashville, Louisville	Southern terminus; I-65 exit 102
Hardin	Fort Knox	0.630	1.014	KY 434 (Battle Training Road)	Interchange
Hardin	Fort Knox	5.957	9.587	KY 251 south (Shepherdsville Road) – Elizabethtown	Northern terminus of KY 251
Hardin	Radcliff	9.581	15.419	US 31W (South Dixie Boulevard) – Elizabethtown, Fort Knox, Patton Museum	
Hardin	Radcliff	10.598	17.056	KY 361 south (Patriot Parkway)	Southern end of KY 361 concurrency
Hardin	Radcliff	11.676	18.791	KY 1646 north (South Logsdon Parkway)	Southern terminus of KY 1646
Hardin	Vine Grove	11.974	19.270	KY 1500 (Rogersville Road) – North Hardin Christian School	
Hardin	Vine Grove	13.022	20.957	KY 144 (Highland Avenue) – Radcliff	
Hardin	Vine Grove	13.754	22.135	KY 1815 north (West Lincoln Trail Boulevard)	Southern terminus of KY 1815
Hardin	Vine Grove	14.534	23.390	KY 361 north / KY 1500 (Knox Avenue) – Fort Knox	Northern end of KY 361 concurrency
Meade		15.864	25.531	KY 144 east / KY 1882 (Old Fort Avenue)	Southern end of KY 144 concurrency
Meade		17.613	28.345	KY 144 west (Coleman Road) – Flaherty	Northern end of KY 144 concurrency
Meade		18.457	29.704	KY 1816 (Rabbit Run Road)	
Meade		19.778	31.830	KY 144 east (Flaherty Road)	Southern end of KY 144 concurrency
Meade		21.841	35.150	KY 333 west (Big Spring Road) – Big Spring	Eastern terminus of KY 333
Meade		22.363	35.990	US 60 – Irvington, Brandenburg	
Meade		22.596	36.365	KY 144 west / Osborne Road	Northern end of KY 144 concurrency
Meade		23.707	38.153	KY 1238 (Garrett Road) – Garrett	
Meade		27.485	44.233	KY 1736 west (Doe Run Ekron Road) / Doe Run Hotel Road	Eastern terminus of KY 1736
Meade		28.747	46.264	KY 1638 east (Old Mill Road) – Muldraugh	Western terminus of KY 1638
Meade		29.652	47.720	KY 933 south (Olin Road)	Northern terminus of KY 933
Meade	Brandenburg	30.085	48.417	KY 448 north (Broadway) / Shamrock Road	Southern terminus of KY 448
Meade	Brandenburg	31.226	50.253	KY 710 (Old State Road)	
Meade	Brandenburg	32.170	51.773	KY 79 south / KY 448 south (High Street) – Irvington	Northern terminus of KY 79; northern terminus of KY 448
Meade	Brandenburg	32.709	52.640	KY 1692 (Hillcrest Drive)	
Meade	Brandenburg	33.449	53.831	KY 228 (Lawrence Street)	
Ohio River		33.845	54.468	Matthew E. Welsh Bridge	
Ohio River		33.845	54.468	SR 135 north	Continuation into Indiana
1.000 mi = 1.609 km; 1.000 km = 0.621 mi: Concurrency terminus
