= Kentucky Route 220 =

State highway in Kentucky, United States

Kentucky Route 220
- KY 220 highlighted in red

Route information
- Maintained by KYTC
- Length: 17.2 mi (27.7 km)

Major junctions
- West end: KY 333 in Big Spring
- KY 920 in Four Corners; KY 1600 in Rineyville; KY 361 south of Radcliff; KY 447 in Radcliff
- East end: US 31W in Radcliff

Location
- Country: United States
- State: Kentucky
- Counties: Hardin

Highway system
- Kentucky State Highway System; Interstate; US; State; Parkways
← KY 218	→ KY 221

Kentucky Route 220 (KY 220) is a 17.2-mile-long (27.7 km) state highway in the U.S. state of Kentucky. The highway connects mostly rural areas of Hardin County with Radcliff.

== Route description ==
KY 220 begins at an intersection with KY 333 (Big Spring Road) in the eastern part of Big Spring, within the extreme northwestern corner of Hardin County. This intersection is just east of the Breckinridge–Meade–Hardin county tripoint. It travels to the east and almost immediately curves to a southerly direction. It curves to the southeast, and then passes Martin Cemetery before entering Four Corners. There, it intersects KY 920 (Salt River Road). KY 220 keeps heading to the southeast and curves to the east-northeast. It curves to the east-southeast and intersects KY 1375 (Martin Road). The two highways head to the southeast concurrently and split. KY 220 heads to the east-northeast and begins a concurrency with KY 1600 (Rineyville Road). They travel to the southeast and pass Rineyville Cemetery. They cross Pawley Creek and enter Rineyville. There, they intersect the northern terminus of KY 2212 (Rineyville School Road), cross over some railroad tracks, and split at a roundabout. KY 220 heads to the northeast and intersects KY 361 (Patriot Parkway). On the southwestern edge of Radcliff, it intersects the northern terminus of KY 447 (South Wilson Road). On the southeastern edge of the city, it meets its eastern terminus, an intersection with US 31W (Dixie Highway).

== Major intersections ==
The entire route is in Hardin County.

Location	mi	km	Destinations	Notes
Big Spring	0.0	0.0	KY 333 (Big Spring Road)	Western terminus
Four Corners	5.5	8.9	KY 920 (Salt River Road)	
	9.0	14.5	KY 1375 north (Martin Road)	Western end of KY 1375 concurrency
	9.1	14.6	KY 1375 south (Long Grove Road)	Eastern end of KY 1375 concurrency
	12.3	19.8	KY 1600 north (Rineyville Road)	Western end of KY 1600 concurrency
Rineyville	13.1	21.1	KY 2212 south (Rineyville School Road) – Rineyville Elementary School	Northern terminus of KY 2212
Rineyville	13.3	21.4	KY 1600 south (Rineyville Road)	Roundabout; eastern end of KY 1600 concurrency
	15.5	24.9	KY 361 (Patriot Parkway)	
Radcliff	16.8	27.0	KY 447 south (South Wilson Road)	Northern terminus of KY 447
Radcliff	17.2	27.7	US 31W (Dixie Highway) – Elizabethtown	Eastern terminus
1.000 mi = 1.609 km; 1.000 km = 0.621 mi: Concurrency terminus
