= Kentucky Route 144 =

State highway in Kentucky, United States

Kentucky Route 144

Route information
- Maintained by KYTC
- Length: 95.325 mi (153.411 km)

Major junctions
- West end: KY 603 in Owensboro
- US 60 / US 231 in Owensboro; KY 69 in Webertown; US 60 west in Cloverport; KY 105 in Cloverport; US 60 east near Cloverport; KY 86 in Union Star; KY 79 south of Brandenburg; KY 448 in Buck Grove; US 60 south of Garrett; KY 313 in Flaherty
- East end: US 31W (Dixie Highway) in Radcliff

Location
- Country: United States
- State: Kentucky
- Counties: Daviess, Hancock, Breckinridge, Meade, Hardin

Highway system
- Kentucky State Highway System; Interstate; US; State; Parkways
← KY 143	→ KY 145
← I-64	KY 64	→ I-65

Kentucky Route 144 (KY 144) is a 95.325-mile (153.411 km) state highway running northeast from KY 603 in Owensboro, Kentucky to US 31W in Radcliff near Fort Knox

== History ==
Kentucky Route 64
- Location: Cloverport–Radcliff
- Existed: 1929–1962?

The section from east of US 60 in Cloverport was originally Kentucky Route 64 (KY 64), but became part of KY 144 when I-64's course within Kentucky went under construction at some time between 1959 and 1963; this was done to comply with a state highway numbering policy, which prohibited duplication of highway numbers.

== Major intersections ==
County	Location	mi	km	Destinations	Notes
Daviess	Owensboro	0.000	0.000	KY 603 south to US 60 / US 231 (Wendell H. Ford Expressway)	Western terminus; northern terminus of KY 603
Daviess	Owensboro	1.934	3.112	KY 2830 north	Southern terminus of KY 2830
Daviess	Owensboro	2.090	3.364	KY 1456 south (Reid Road)	Northern terminus of KY 1456
Daviess	Owensboro	2.190	3.524	US 60 west / US 231 south (Wendell H. Ford Expressway) to I-165	Ramp from eastbound KY 144 to southbound Ford Freeway
Daviess	Owensboro	2.242	3.608	US 60 west / US 231 south (Wendell H. Ford Expressway) to I-165	Ramp from southbound Ford Freeway to KY 144 and ramp from westbound KY 144 to southbound Ford Freeway
Daviess	Owensboro	2.342	3.769	US 60 east / US 231 north (Wendell H. Ford Freeway)	Ramp from northbound Ford Freeway to KY 144 and ramp from eastbound KY 144 to northbound Ford Freeway
Daviess	Owensboro	2.394	3.853	US 60 east / US 231 north (Wendell H. Ford Freeway)	Ramp from westbound KY 144 to northbound Ford Freeway
Daviess	Thruston	3.537	5.692	KY 405 north	Southern terminus of KY 405
Daviess		4.966	7.992	KY 1389 east	Western terminus of KY 1389
Daviess		5.641	9.078	KY 2122 north	Southern terminus of KY 2122
Daviess	Ensor	6.331	10.189	KY 142 south	Northern terminus of KY 142
Daviess		7.624	12.270	KY 1831 west (Knottsville–Mount Zion Road)	Eastern terminus of KY 1831
Daviess	Knottsville	11.015	17.727	KY 951 north	Southern terminus of KY 951
Daviess		14.427	23.218	KY 764 south	Northern terminus of KY 764
Daviess		15.001	24.142	KY 2157 south	Northern terminus of KY 2157
Hancock	Pellville	16.839	27.100	KY 2181 north	Southern terminus of KY 2181
Hancock	Websterstown	19.248	30.977	KY 69	
Hancock	Patesville	23.074	37.134	KY 1700 south	Northern terminus of KY 1700
Hancock	Dukes	26.073	41.960	KY 1265 north	Southern terminus of KY 1265
Breckinridge		28.716	46.214	KY 992 south	Northern terminus of KY 992
Breckinridge		29.477	47.439	US 60 west	Western end of concurrency with US 60
Breckinridge	Cloverport	30.356	48.853	US 60 Bus. east – Cloverport, Business District, Cloverport Historic District	Western terminus of US 60 Business
Breckinridge	Cloverport	31.187	50.191	KY 105 (Elm Street)	
Breckinridge	Cloverport	32.720	52.658	US 60 Bus. west – Cloverport, Business District, Cloverport Historic District	Eastern terminus of US 60 Business
Breckinridge	Cloverport	34.404	55.368	US 60 east	Eastern end of concurrency with US 60
Breckinridge		43.737	70.388	KY 2779 south (New Bethel Road)	Northern terminus of KY 2779; near Stephensport
Breckinridge		47.960	77.184	KY 259	
Breckinridge	Union Star	49.136	79.077	KY 86 east	Western terminus of KY 86
Breckinridge	Frymire	53.033	85.348	KY 376 east	Western terminus of KY 376
Meade		58.061	93.440	KY 259 south (Mooleyville Road)	Northern terminus of KY 259
Meade		58.907	94.802	KY 230 east (Riverview Road)	Western terminus of KY 230
Meade		61.374	98.772	KY 230 west (Concordia Road)	Eastern terminus of KY 230
Meade		62.287	100.241	KY 228 east	Western terminus of KY 228
Meade	Andyville	63.000	101.389	KY 1919 south	Northern terminus of KY 1919
Meade		65.605	105.581	KY 1844 north – Liberty	Southern terminus of KY 1844
Meade	Payneville	67.752	109.036	KY 376 west	Eastern terminus of KY 376
Meade		68.076	109.558	KY 1239 east (Midway Road)	Western terminus of KY 1239
Meade		71.530	115.116	KY 2731 north (New Highland Church Road)	Southern terminus of KY 2731
Meade		71.538	115.129	KY 1692 east (Fairground Road)	Western terminus of KY 1692
Meade		73.206	117.814	KY 79 north	Northern end of concurrency with KY 79
Meade	Midway	74.629	120.104	KY 79 south / KY 1239 west (Midway Road)	Southern end of concurrency with KY 79; eastern terminus of KY 1239
Meade		77.176	124.203	KY 2727 west (Haysville Road)	Eastern terminus of KY 2727
Meade		77.976	125.490	KY 710 (Old State Road)	
Meade	Ekron	79.289	127.603	KY 941 south (Stringtown Road)	Northern terminus of KY 941
Meade	Garrett			KY 1238 (Garrett Road)	
Meade		82.795	133.246	KY 313 north (Brandenburg Road)	Western terminus of KY 313 concurrency
Meade		83.028	133.621	US 60	
Meade		85.091	136.941	KY 333 west (Big Spring Road)	Eastern terminus of KY 333
Meade	Flaherty	85.613	137.781	KY 313 south (Joe Prather Highway South)	Eastern terminus of KY 313 concurrency - 144 splits off into Flaherty here
Meade	Flaherty	86.796	139.685	KY 1600 north (St. Martin Road)	Western end of KY 1600 overlap
Meade	Flaherty	86.982	139.984	KY 1816 north (Rabbit Run Road)	Southern terminus of KY 1816
Meade	Flaherty	87.043	140.082	KY 1600 south (Rineyville Road)	Eastern end of KY 1600 overlap
Meade	Flaherty	88.035	141.679	KY 313 north (Joe Prather Highway South)	Beginning of 2nd concurrency with KY 313 / end of Flaherty spur
Meade		89.784	144.493	KY 313 south (Joe Prather Highway South) / KY 1882 north (Old Fort Avenue)	End of 2nd concurrency with KY 313; beginning of brief overlap of KY 1882
Meade		90.209	145.177	KY 1882 south (Flaherty Road)	Eastern end of KY 1882 overlap (144 continues east while 1882 goes west before turning south again)
Hardin	Vine Grove	91.609	147.430	KY 1500 west (Knox Avenue)	Western end of brief overlap of KY 1500
Hardin	Vine Grove	91.894	147.889	KY 391 south (High Street)	Northern terminus of KY 391
Hardin	Vine Grove	92.254	148.468	KY 1500 east (East Main Street)	Eastern end of KY 1500 overlap
Hardin	Vine Grove	93.266	150.097	KY 313 (Joe Prather Highway)	
Hardin	Radcliff	94.310	151.777	KY 1646 (S. Logdon Parkway) – North Park Elementary School, North Hardin High School	Both schools are a short distance south of this intersection
Hardin	Radcliff	95.325	153.411	US 31W (S. Dixie Highway) – Fort Knox, Elizabethtown	Eastern terminus
1.000 mi = 1.609 km; 1.000 km = 0.621 mi: Concurrency terminus; Incomplete access

== See also ==
- List of state highways in Kentucky
