= Kentucky's 10th Senate district =

American legislative district

Kentucky's 10th State Senate district
Senator
Matthew Deneen; R–Elizabethtown
since January 1, 2023
- Registration: 46.2% Republican; 40.1% Democratic; 12.9% No party preference
- Demographics: 75.1% White; 10.7% Black; 6.2% Hispanic; 1.9% Asian; 0.2% Native American; 0.3% Hawaiian/Pacific Islander; 0.3% Other; 5.4% Multiracial
- Population (2023): 113,835
- Registered voters (2025): 91,947

Kentucky's 10th Senatorial district is one of 38 districts in the Kentucky Senate. Located in the central part of the state, it comprises the counties of Hardin, and part of Jefferson. It has been represented by Matthew Deneen (R–Elizabethtown) since 2023. As of 2023, the district had a population of 113,835.

From 1966 to 1972, the district was represented by Walter Dee Huddleston, who would later be elected U.S. senator from Kentucky.

== Voter registration ==
On January 1, 2025, the district had 91,947 registered voters, who were registered with the following parties.

Party	Registration	
Party	Voters	%
Republican	42,465	46.18
Democratic	36,825	40.05
Independent	5,084	5.53
Libertarian	575	0.63
Green	80	0.09
Constitution	70	0.08
Socialist Workers	24	0.03
Reform	5	0.01
"Other"	6,819	7.42
Total	91,947	100.00
Source: Kentucky State Board of Elections

== Election results from statewide races ==
=== 2014 – 2020 ===
Year	Office	Results (Note: Figures presented in this table are calculated by summing precinct election results published by the Kentucky State Board of Elections, using precinct data that list each precinct's senatorial district.)
2014	Senator	McConnell 56.9 - 39.7%
2015	Governor	Bevin 55.7 - 40.2%
2015	Secretary of State	Knipper 50.8 - 49.2%
2015	Attorney General	Westerfield 51.9 - 48.1%
2015	Auditor of Public Accounts	Harmon 53.4 - 46.6%
2015	State Treasurer	Ball 63.5 - 36.5%
2015	Commissioner of Agriculture	Quarles 61.3 - 38.7%
2016	President	Trump 62.6 - 32.3%
2016	Senator	Paul 57.5 - 42.5%
2019	Governor	Bevin 50.6 - 47.1%
2019	Secretary of State	Adams 51.3 - 48.7%
2019	Attorney General	Cameron 63.1 - 36.9%
2019	Auditor of Public Accounts	Harmon 55.4 - 40.7%
2019	State Treasurer	Ball 62.4 - 37.6%
2019	Commissioner of Agriculture	Quarles 58.1 - 37.5%
2020	President	Trump 61.1 - 36.9%
2020	Senator	McConnell 55.9 - 39.3%
2020	Amendment 1	Yes 69.3 - 30.7%
2020	Amendment 2	No 66.7 - 33.3%

=== 2022 – present ===
Year	Office	Results
2022	Senator	Paul 62.9 - 37.0%
2022	Amendment 1	No 51.6 - 48.4%
2022	Amendment 2	No 51.5 - 48.5%
2023	Governor	Cameron 50.4 - 49.6%
2023	Secretary of State	Adams 61.6 - 38.3%
2023	Attorney General	Coleman 59.8 - 40.2%
2023	Auditor of Public Accounts	Ball 62.3 - 37.7%
2023	State Treasurer	Metcalf 58.8 - 41.1%
2023	Commissioner of Agriculture	Shell 60.0 - 40.0%
2024	President	Trump 63.9 - 34.4%
2024	Amendment 1	Yes 64.7 - 35.3%
2024	Amendment 2	No 62.7 - 37.3%

== List of members representing the district ==
Member	Party	Years	Electoral history	District location
Walter Dee Huddleston (Elizabethtown)	Democratic	January 1, 1966 – December 1972	Elected in 1965. Reelected in 1969. Resigned after being elected to the United States Senate.	1964–1972
Walter Dee Huddleston (Elizabethtown)	Democratic	January 1, 1966 – December 1972	Elected in 1965. Reelected in 1969. Resigned after being elected to the United States Senate.	1972–1974
Joe Prather (Vine Grove)	Democratic	January 1, 1974 – January 1, 1987	Elected in 1973. Reelected in 1977. Reelected in 1981. Retired.	1974–1984
Joe Prather (Vine Grove)	Democratic	January 1, 1974 – January 1, 1987	Elected in 1973. Reelected in 1977. Reelected in 1981. Retired.	1984–1993; Bullitt (part), Hardin (part), and LaRue Counties.
Virgil Pearman (Radcliff)	Democratic	January 1, 1987 – January 1, 1991	Elected in 1986. Lost renomination.	1984–1993; Bullitt (part), Hardin (part), and LaRue Counties.
Tom Smith (Sonora)	Democratic	January 1, 1991 – January 1, 1995	Elected in 1990. Lost reelection.	1984–1993; Bullitt (part), Hardin (part), and LaRue Counties.
Tom Smith (Sonora)	Democratic	January 1, 1991 – January 1, 1995	Elected in 1990. Lost reelection.	1993–1997
Elizabeth Tori (Radcliff)	Republican	January 1, 1995 – January 1, 2011	Elected in 1994. Reelected in 1998. Reelected in 2002. Reelected in 2006. Lost reelection.	1993–1997
Elizabeth Tori (Radcliff)	Republican	January 1, 1995 – January 1, 2011	Elected in 1994. Reelected in 1998. Reelected in 2002. Reelected in 2006. Lost reelection.	1997–2003
Elizabeth Tori (Radcliff)	Republican	January 1, 1995 – January 1, 2011	Elected in 1994. Reelected in 1998. Reelected in 2002. Reelected in 2006. Lost reelection.	2003–2015
Dennis Parrett (Elizabethtown)	Democratic	January 1, 2011 – January 1, 2023	Elected in 2010. Reelected in 2014. Reelected in 2018. Retired.	2003–2015
Dennis Parrett (Elizabethtown)	Democratic	January 1, 2011 – January 1, 2023	Elected in 2010. Reelected in 2014. Reelected in 2018. Retired.	2015–2023
Matthew Deneen (Elizabethtown)	Republican	January 1, 2023 – present	Elected in 2022. Reelected in 2026.	2023–present
