= Joe Prather =

American politician

Member of the Kentucky Senate from the 10th district
- In office January 1, 1974 – January 1, 1987
- Preceded by: Walter Dee Huddleston
- Succeeded by: Virgil Pearman

Member of the Kentucky House of Representatives from the 26th district
- In office January 1, 1968 – January 1, 1974
- Preceded by: Martin Louis Straney
- Succeeded by: Virgil Pearman

Personal details
- Born: Joseph Wayne Prather; 1939 (age 86–87) Hardin, Kentucky, U.S.
- Party: Democratic

Joseph Wayne Prather (born 1939) was the Secretary of the Kentucky Transportation Cabinet. He is a Democrat.

A resident of Vine Grove, Kentucky, Prather was a State Senator and received the nomination for lieutenant governor in 1976.

He is, however, probably best known as an unsuccessful Democratic nominee for Representative from the Kentucky's 2nd district in the special election on May 24, 1994, after longtime incumbent and a fellow Democrat William Huston Natcher died in office after over 40 years of service in the House.

The district was thought to be a safe Democratic Party seat. Everyone elected since 1865 were Democrats.

Despite this Prather faced a strong challenge from the Republican candidate Ron Lewis, who got support from numerous national Republican sources and many religious conservative groups.

Lewis often compared and tied Prather to then-unpopular (this was before the 1994 midterm election, when Democrats lost control in both houses of Congress for the first time since 40 years) President Bill Clinton. One of his commercials said: If you like Bill Clinton, you will love Joe Prather. In results, Prather had lost by ten points.

A portion of Kentucky Route 313 is named the Joe Prather Highway in his honor.
