= Kentucky Route 376 =

State highway in Kentucky, United States

Kentucky Route 376
- KY 376 highlighted in red

Route information
- Maintained by KYTC
- Length: 5.599 mi (9.011 km)

Major junctions
- South end: KY 144 in Frymire
- KY 477 northeast of Frymire
- North end: KY 144 in Payneville

Location
- Country: United States
- State: Kentucky
- Counties: Breckinridge, Meade

Highway system
- Kentucky State Highway System; Interstate; US; State; Parkways
← KY 375	→ KY 377

Kentucky Route 376 (KY 376) is a 5.599-mile-long (9.011 km) state highway in the U.S. state of Kentucky. The highway connects mostly rural areas of Breckinridge and Meade counties with Payneville.

== Route description ==
KY 376 begins at an intersection with KY 144 in Frymire, within Breckinridge County. It travels to the northeast and enters Meade County. It intersects the northern terminus of KY 477 (Hardesty–Raymond Road). It curves to the east-northeast and intersects the northern terminus of KY 2734 (New State Road). It curves to the north-northeast and enters Payneville, where it meets its northern terminus, a second intersection with KY 144 (Payneville Road).

== Major intersections ==
County	Location	mi	km	Destinations	Notes
Breckinridge	Frymire	0.000	0.000	KY 144	Southern terminus
Meade		0.994	1.600	KY 477 south (Hardesty–Raymond Road)	Northern terminus of KY 477
Meade		2.511	4.041	KY 2734 south (New State Road)	Northern terminus of KY 2734
Meade	Payneville	5.599	9.011	KY 144 (Payneville Road)	Northern terminus
1.000 mi = 1.609 km; 1.000 km = 0.621 mi
