= Kentucky's 26th House of Representatives district =

American legislative district

Kentucky's 26th State House of Representatives district
Representative
Peyton Griffee; R–Mount Washington
since March 25, 2024
- Registration: 52.1% Republican; 34.8% Democratic; 12.3% No party preference
- Demographics: 83.0% White; 4.8% Black; 6.9% Hispanic; 1.3% Asian; 0.1% Native American; 0.6% Other; 3.4% Multiracial
- Population (2024): 45,092
- Registered voters (2026): 30,749

Kentucky's 26th House of Representatives district is one of 100 districts in the Kentucky House of Representatives. Located in the central part of the state, it comprises parts of Bullitt and Hardin Counties. It has been represented by Peyton Griffee (R–Mount Washington) since 2024. As of 2024, the district had a population of 45,092.

== Voter registration ==
On January 1, 2026, the district had 30,749 registered voters, who were registered with the following parties.

Party	Registration	
Party	Voters	%
Republican	16,032	52.14
Democratic	10,706	34.82
Independent	1,547	5.03
Libertarian	173	0.56
Green	24	0.08
Constitution	13	0.04
Socialist Workers	4	0.03
Reform	3	0.01
"Other"	2,247	7.31
Total	30,749	100.00

== List of members representing the district ==
Member	Party	Years	Electoral history	District location
Virgil Pearman (Radcliff)	Democratic	January 1, 1978 – January 1, 1987	Elected in 1977. Reelected in 1979. Reelected in 1981. Reelected in 1984. Retired to run for the Kentucky Senate.	1974–1985; Hardin County (part).
Virgil Pearman (Radcliff)	Democratic	January 1, 1978 – January 1, 1987	Elected in 1977. Reelected in 1979. Reelected in 1981. Reelected in 1984. Retired to run for the Kentucky Senate.	1985–1993; Hardin (part) and LaRue (part) Counties.
Bill Ark (Hodgenville)	Democratic	January 1, 1987 – January 1, 1993	Elected in 1986. Reelected in 1988. Reelected in 1990. Retired.	1985–1993; Hardin (part) and LaRue (part) Counties.
Virgil Pearman (Radcliff)	Democratic	January 1, 1993 – September 1, 1993	Elected in 1992. Resigned.	1993–1997; Hardin (part) and LaRue (part) Counties.
Kaye Bondurant (Hodgenville)	Democratic	November 1993 – January 1, 1997	Elected to finish Pearman's term. Reelected in 1994. Retired.	1993–1997; Hardin (part) and LaRue (part) Counties.
Mike Weaver (Radcliff)	Democratic	January 1, 1997 – January 1, 2007	Elected in 1996. Reelected in 1998. Reelected in 2000. Reelected in 2002. Reelected in 2004. Retired to run for Kentucky's; 2nd congressional district.	1997–2003
Mike Weaver (Radcliff)	Democratic	January 1, 1997 – January 1, 2007	Elected in 1996. Reelected in 1998. Reelected in 2000. Reelected in 2002. Reelected in 2004. Retired to run for Kentucky's; 2nd congressional district.	2003–2015
Tim Moore (Elizabethtown)	Republican	January 1, 2007 – January 1, 2015	Elected in 2006. Reelected in 2008. Reelected in 2010. Reelected in 2012. Redistricted to the 18th district.	2003–2015
Russell Webber (Shepherdsville)	Republican	January 1, 2015 – January 2, 2024	Redistricted from the 49th district and reelected in 2014. Reelected in 2016. Reelected in 2018. Reelected in 2020. Reelected in 2022. Resigned to become deputy treasurer of Kentucky.	2015–2023
Russell Webber (Shepherdsville)	Republican	January 1, 2015 – January 2, 2024	Redistricted from the 49th district and reelected in 2014. Reelected in 2016. Reelected in 2018. Reelected in 2020. Reelected in 2022. Resigned to become deputy treasurer of Kentucky.	2023–present
Peyton Griffee (Mount Washington)	Republican	March 25, 2024 – present	Elected to finish Webber's term. Reelected in 2024. Reelected in 2026.	2023–present
