= Rineyville, Kentucky =

Census-designated place in Kentucky, United States

- Census-designated place
- Location within Kentucky Location within the United States
- Coordinates: 37°44′58″N 85°58′12″W
- Country: United States
- State: Kentucky
- County: Hardin

Area
  - Total: 4.60 sq mi (11.91 km^{2})
  - Land: 4.56 sq mi (11.82 km^{2})
  - Water: 0.035 sq mi (0.09 km^{2})
- Elevation: 705 ft (215 m)

Population (2020)
  - Total: 3,039
  - Density: 665.7/sq mi (257.04/km^{2})
- Time zone: UTC-5 (Eastern Time Zone)
  - Summer (DST): UTC-4 (EST)
- ZIP code: 40162
- Area codes: 270 & 364
- FIPS code: 21-65388
- GNIS feature ID: 501960

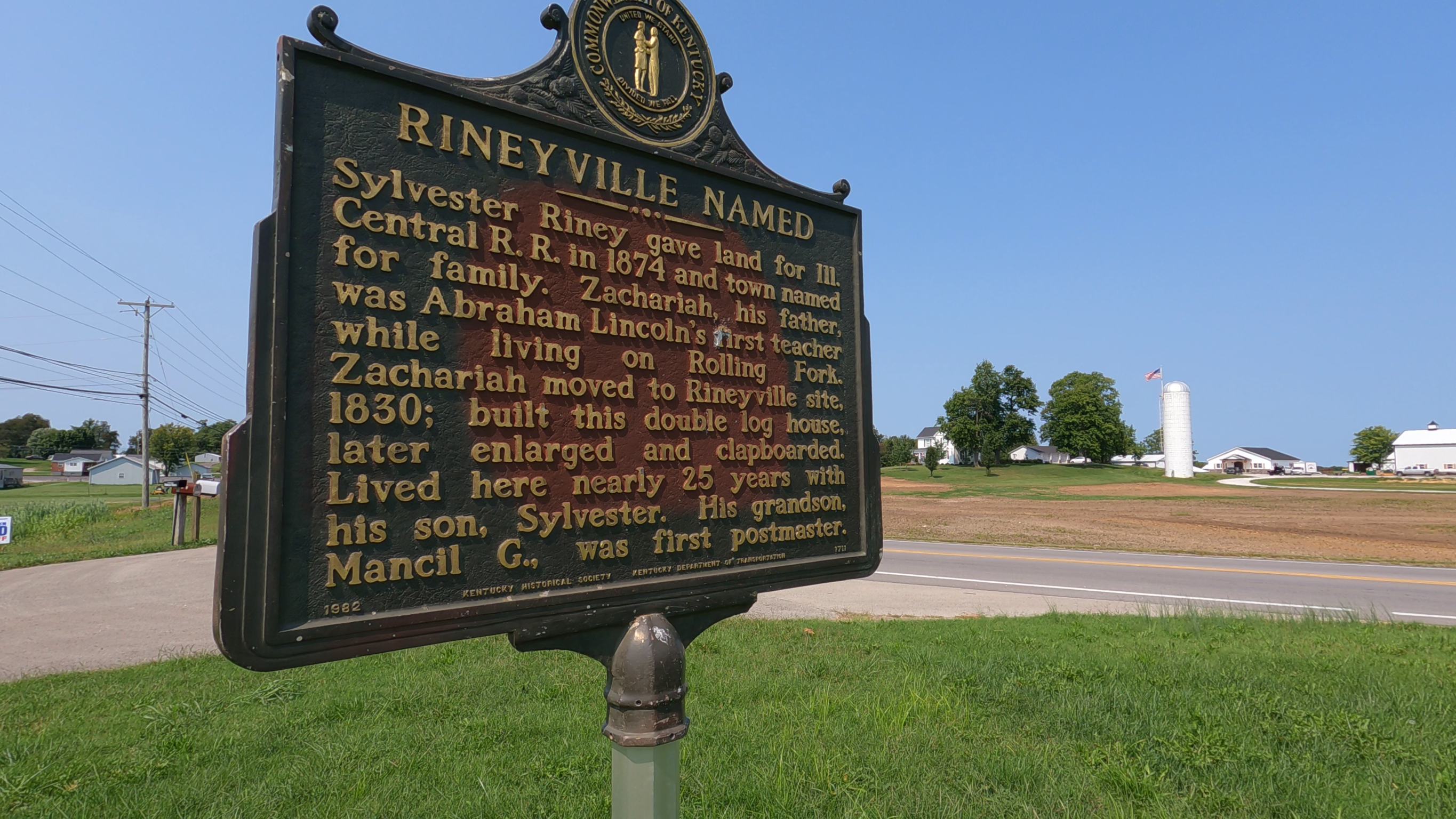
The town of Rineyville, KY historical marker.

Rineyville is an unincorporated community and census-designated place (CDP) in Hardin County, Kentucky, United States. It is located 7 miles (11 km) northwest of Elizabethtown. The population was 3,039 as of the 2020 Census. The Paducah and Louisville Railway runs north and south through the community.

There is no formal city government; a Magistrate, elected to the Hardin County Fiscal Court, represents the unincorporated community. The primary law enforcement agency for Rineyville is the Kentucky State Police – Post 4 in Elizabethtown. The Rineyville Fire Department, created in 1979, consists of over 30 volunteers from the community. Some neighboring communities include Vine Grove to the north, Radcliff to the northeast, and Cecilia to the south.

Rineyville is named for past resident Zachariah Riney, the first school teacher of young Abraham Lincoln.

== Demographics ==
Historical population
Census	Pop.	Note	%±
2020	3,039		—
U.S. Decennial Census

=== 2020 census ===
As of the 2020 census, Rineyville had a population of 3,039. The median age was 39.5 years. 28.3% of residents were under the age of 18 and 12.2% of residents were 65 years of age or older. For every 100 females there were 100.5 males, and for every 100 females age 18 and over there were 93.3 males age 18 and over.

0.0% of residents lived in urban areas, while 100.0% lived in rural areas.

There were 1,001 households in Rineyville, of which 37.9% had children under the age of 18 living in them. Of all households, 66.7% were married-couple households, 12.9% were households with a male householder and no spouse or partner present, and 14.0% were households with a female householder and no spouse or partner present. About 13.6% of all households were made up of individuals and 6.2% had someone living alone who was 65 years of age or older.

There were 1,063 housing units, of which 5.8% were vacant. The homeowner vacancy rate was 2.5% and the rental vacancy rate was 4.2%.

Racial composition as of the 2020 census
Race	Number	Percent
White	2,456	80.8%
Black or African American	237	7.8%
American Indian and Alaska Native	14	0.5%
Asian	20	0.7%
Native Hawaiian and Other Pacific Islander	2	0.1%
Some other race	36	1.2%
Two or more races	274	9.0%
Hispanic or Latino (of any race)	208	6.8%
