= Bud Gregory =

Bud Gregory may refer to:

- Bud Gregory (American politician) (1930–2018)
- Bud Gregory (Canadian politician) (1926–2016)
