= Garrett, Kentucky =

Garrett is the name of the following places in the U.S. state of Kentucky:

- Garrett, Floyd County, Kentucky
- Garrett, Meade County, Kentucky
