= Bill Gaither (blues musician) =

American singer (1910–1970)

- Also known as: "Little Bill" Gaither; Leroy's Buddy
- Born: William Arthur Gaither; April 21, 1910; Belmont, Bullitt County, Kentucky, U.S.
- Died: October 30, 1970 (aged 60) Indianapolis, U.S.
- Genres: Blues
- Instrument: Guitar
- Years active: 1920s–1940s

William Arthur Gaither (April 21, 1910 – October 30, 1970), sometimes known as "Little Bill" Gaither or Leroy's Buddy, was an American blues guitarist and singer.

== Biography ==
Born in Belmont, Bullitt County, Kentucky, Gaither recorded over one hundred songs in the 1930s for labels such as Decca and Okeh. He often wrote and recorded with the pianist George "Honey" Hill. After his friend Leroy Carr's death in 1935, Gaither was often credited as "Leroy's Buddy".

One of Gaither's most famous blues songs was "Champ Joe Louis", recorded on June 23, 1938, the day after Louis won his rematch against Max Schmeling. The blues scholar Paul Oliver has cited Gaither among a group of important, but understudied, 20th century musicians. His blues lyrics have been appreciated as poetry.

Gaither ran a radio repair shop in Louisville, Kentucky, for some time. He died in Indianapolis, Indiana, in 1970, and is buried in New Crown Cemetery in Indianapolis.

He is not to be confused with another musician, William Augustus "Bill" Gaither (1927–1985), who recorded with Roy Milton.

== See also ==
- The Encyclopedia of Louisville, ed. by J. E. Kleber
- The Blues, by H. Elmer, e.g. p. 49
