= Hardin Springs, Kentucky =

Unincorporated community in Kentucky, United States

- Unincorporated community
- Location within Kentucky Location within the United States
- Coordinates: 37°36′34″N 86°15′23″W
- Country: United States
- State: Kentucky
- County: Hardin
- Elevation: 538 ft (164 m)
- Time zone: UTC-5 (Eastern (EST))
  - Summer (DST): UTC-4 (EDT)
- Area codes: 270 & 364
- GNIS feature ID: 508182

Hardin Springs is an unincorporated community in Hardin County, Kentucky, United States. Hardin Springs is located on Kentucky Route 84, 22.4 miles (36.0 km) southwest of Elizabethtown. Hardin Springs is also home to the Hardin Springs School, a building which is on the National Register of Historic Places.
