= Jim DuPlessis =

American politician

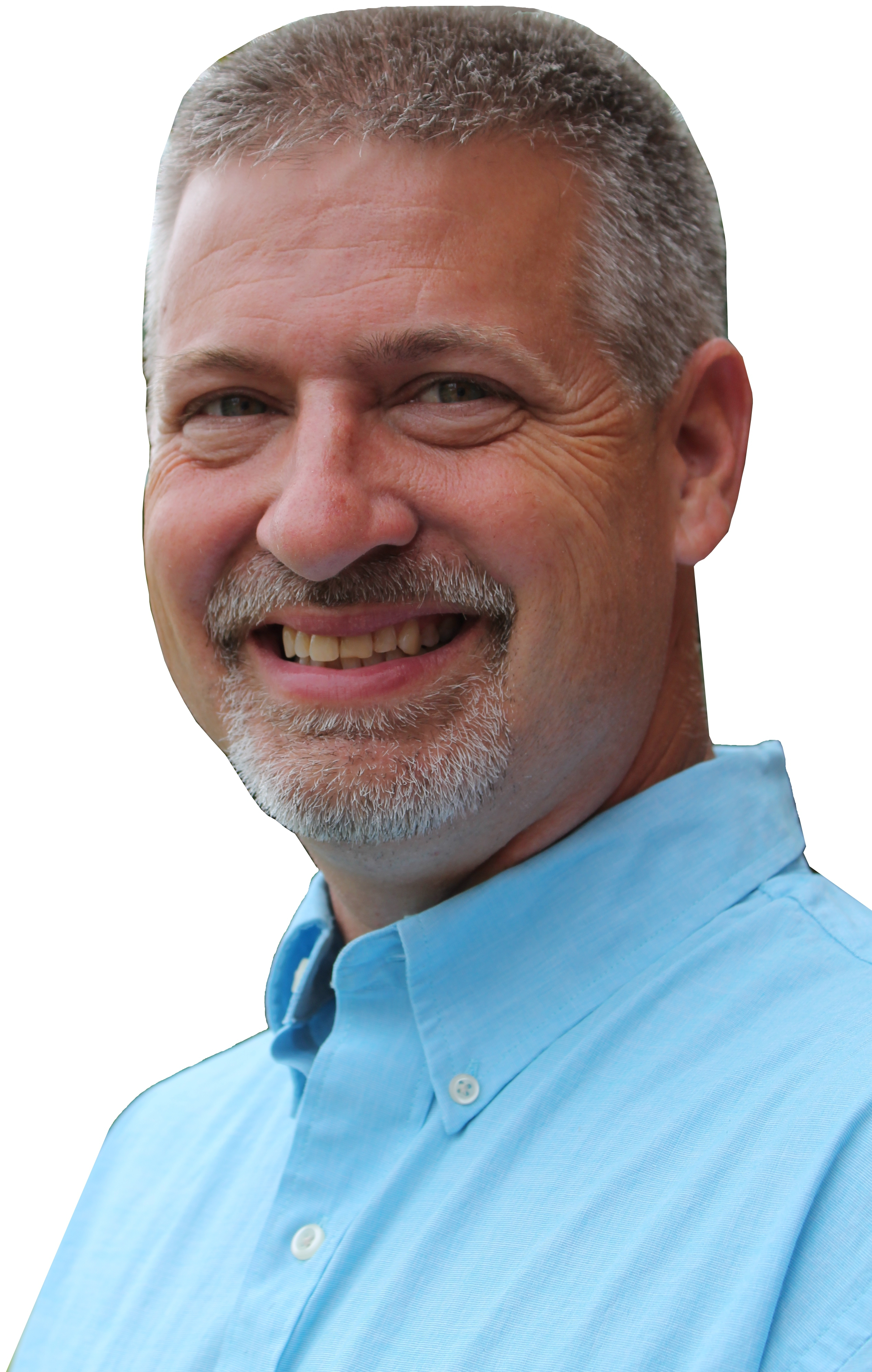
- DuPlessis in 2014

Member of the Kentucky House of Representatives from the 25th district
- In office January 1, 2015 – January 1, 2023
- Preceded by: Jimmie Lee
- Succeeded by: Steve Bratcher

Personal details
- Born: November 19, 1969 (age 56) Elizabethtown, Kentucky
- Party: Republican
- Spouse: Marcy Duvall (m. 1993)
- Children: 3
- Education: Elizabethtown Community College; University of Kentucky

James Carme DuPlessis (born November 19, 1969) is an American politician and engineer who served as a Republican member of the Kentucky House of Representatives for House District 25 from 2015 to 2023. As an engineer, he works for ChemTreat Inc. DuPlessis unseated longtime representative, Jimmie Lee, in the 2014 election and was re-elected in 2016. He did not seek reelection in 2022.

== Early life ==
Jim DuPlessis was born to John and Kitty DuPlessis in Elizabethtown, Kentucky, on November 19, 1969. He was the youngest of five siblings. DuPlessis graduated from Elizabethtown High School, then spent two years at Elizabethtown Community College in a pre-engineering pathway. He then attended the University of Kentucky and graduated with a bachelor's degree in mechanical engineering.

== Personal life ==
DuPlessis met his wife to be, Marcy Duvall, at Elizabethtown Community College. They went on to get married the summer of 1993. Upon graduation, DuPlessis was hired by Nalco Chemical Company, where spent time in both Chicago and Houston. Two of their three children, James Jr. and Kate, were born in Houston before Nalco transferred DuPlessis back to his home town of Elizabethtown in 1998. DuPlessis' third daughter, Victoria, was born in Elizabethtown in 2001.

In 2007 he was made a deacon of his church, Severns Valley Baptist. He had been actively teaching Sunday School and other ministries prior to being named a deacon. He continues to serve at that church, where he enjoys doing overseas mission trips. He started Boy Scout Troop 604 at this church in 2008, where he served as scoutmaster.

== Elections ==
2014: DuPlessis beat 22-year incumbent Democrat, Jimmie Lee, in the general election 50.9% to 49.1

2016: DuPlessis beat Democratic challenger, Michael Dile, in the general election 72.4% to 26.6%

== Bills ==
In the 2016 DuPlessis filed a bill to eliminate the look back period for first offense DUI convictions. This essentially means that, if passed, anyone convicted of multiple DUI's in their lifetime could not go back to a first offense penalty.
