= Kaye Bondurant =

American politician

Member of the Kentucky House of Representatives from the 26th district
- In office November 1993 – January 1, 1997
- Preceded by: Virgil Pearman
- Succeeded by: Mike Weaver

Personal details
- Born: November 4, 1934
- Died: August 5, 2019 (aged 84)
- Party: Democratic

Katherine "Kaye" Bondurant (née Keyes; November 4, 1934 – August 5, 2019) was an American politician from Kentucky who was a member of the Kentucky House of Representatives from 1993 to 1997. Bondurant was first elected in a November 1993 special election following the resignation of incumbent Representative Virgil Pearman. She did not seek reelection in 1996.

She died in August 2019 at age 84.
