= Mike Weaver (politician) =

American politician

Member of the Kentucky House of Representatives from the 26th district
- In office January 1, 1997 – January 1, 2007
- Preceded by: Kaye Bondurant
- Succeeded by: Tim Moore

Personal details
- Born: October 31, 1938 (age 87)
- Party: Democratic

John Michael Weaver (born October 31, 1938) is a politician and retired military officer from the U.S. state of Kentucky. He served as a member of the Kentucky House of Representatives 1997–2007, representing the 26th District. He was elected the mayor of Radcliff, Kentucky 2015–2018. Weaver is a member of the Democratic Party.

Weaver served in the United States Navy as a young man; he later joined the U.S. Army. He fought in the Vietnam War. He became an Army officer after graduating from Officer Candidate School. He is considered a Fighting Dem.

In the Kentucky House of Representatives, Weaver helped found a conservative caucus of Democrats in the state House called the Commonwealth Democrats. That group challenged the Democratic House leadership in the fall of 2005 because they felt the leaders had allowed the Republican Party to paint them as liberal. Many of them, including Weaver, also supported the tax modernization plan of Republican Governor Ernie Fletcher early on.

Weaver was the Democratic nominee for congress against incumbent Republican Ron Lewis in 2006.

In 2007, Weaver sought the Democratic nomination for Kentucky state treasurer.

A Roman Catholic, Weaver and his wife Lois have four children.

Weaver was elected to a four-year term as mayor of the City of Radcliff, Kentucky from January 2015 to December 2018 along with city council members Barbara Baker, Stan Holmes, Edward Palmer, TW Shortt, Kim Thompson, and Chris Yates, each for a two-year term. He was succeeded in 2018 by J. J. Duvall. Weaver succeeded Duvall in 2014 after he ran for Judge-Executive.

Kentucky House of Representatives
Preceded by Kaye Bondurant	Member of the Kentucky House of Representatives from the 26th district 1997–2007	Succeeded by Tim Moore
Political offices
Preceded by J. J. Duvall	Mayor of Radcliff, Kentucky; 2015–2019	Succeeded by J. J. Duvall
