= Virgil Pearman =

American politician (1933–2012)

Member of the Kentucky Senate from the 10th district
- In office January 1, 1987 – January 1, 1991
- Preceded by: Joe Prather
- Succeeded by: Tom Smith

Member of the Kentucky House of Representatives from the 26th district
- In office January 1, 1993 – September 1, 1993
- Preceded by: Bill Ark
- Succeeded by: Kaye Bondurant
- In office January 1, 1978 – January 1, 1987
- Preceded by: Nick Pearl
- Succeeded by: Bill Ark
- In office January 1, 1974 – January 1, 1976
- Preceded by: Joe Prather
- Succeeded by: Nick Pearl

Personal details
- Born: July 13, 1933
- Died: February 17, 2012 (aged 78)
- Party: Democratic

Virgil Lee Pearman (July 13, 1933 – February 17, 2012) was an American politician from Kentucky who was a member of the Kentucky House of Representatives and Kentucky Senate. Pearman was first elected to the house in 1973 when incumbent representative Joe Prather ran for the senate. He did not run for reelection in 1975. He ran for the house again in 1977, defeating incumbent representative Nick Pearl for renomination.

Pearman was elected to the Kentucky Senate in 1986 when Prather retired. He was defeated for renomination in 1990 by Tom Smith.

Pearman returned to the house in 1992 when incumbent representative Bill Ark retired. He resigned from the house in September 1993.

He died in February 2012 at age 78.
