= Tom Smith (politician, born 1938) =

American politician

Member of the Kentucky Senate from the 10th district
- In office January 1, 1991 – January 1, 1995
- Preceded by: Virgil Pearman
- Succeeded by: Elizabeth Tori

Personal details
- Born: 1938 (age 87–88)
- Party: Democratic

Tom Smith (born 1938) is an American politician from Kentucky who was a member of the Kentucky Senate from 1991 to 1995. Smith was elected in 1990, defeating incumbent senator Virgil Pearman for renomination. He was defeated for reelection in 1994 by Republican Elizabeth Tori.
