= Jimmie Lee =

American politician

Member of the Kentucky House of Representatives from the 25th district
- In office January 1, 1993 – January 1, 2015
- Preceded by: Bud Gregory
- Succeeded by: Jim DuPlessis

Personal details
- Born: March 27, 1937 (age 89)
- Party: Democratic

Military service
- Allegiance: United States
- Branch/service: United States Air Force
- Years of service: 1954–1958
- Rank: Sergeant

Jimmie C. Lee (born March 27, 1937) is an American politician and former Democratic member of the Kentucky House of Representatives representing District 25 from January 1993 to January 2015. He was defeated for reelection in 2014 by Republican Jim DuPlessis.

== Electoral history ==
- 2012 Lee was challenged in the three-way May 22, 2012 Democratic Primary, winning with 1,572 votes (77.6%) and was unopposed for the November 6, 2012 General election, winning with 10,737 votes.
- 1992 Lee was initially elected in the 1992 Democratic Primary and the November 3, 1992 General election.
- 1994 Lee was unopposed for both the 1994 Democratic Primary and the November 8, 1994 General election.
- 1996 Lee was unopposed for the 1996 Democratic Primary and won the November 5, 1996 General election against Republican nominee Lenore Snyder.
- 1998 Lee was unopposed for both the 1998 Democratic Primary and the November 3, 1998 General election.
- 2000 Lee was unopposed for the 2000 Democratic Primary and won the November 7, 2000 General election with 10,094 votes (58.0%) against Republican nominee Harry Berry.
- 2002 Lee was unopposed for both the 2002 Democratic Primary and the November 5, 2002 General election, winning with 7,221 votes.
- 2004 Lee was unopposed for both the 2004 Democratic Primary and the November 2, 2004 General election, winning with 10,990 votes.
- 2006 Lee was challenged in the 2006 Democratic Primary, winning with 4,507 votes (84.8%) and was unopposed for the November 7, 2006 General election, winning with 10,843 votes.
- 2008 Lee was challenged in the 2008 Democratic Primary, winning with 5,528 votes (79.7%) and the November 4, 2008 General election, winning with 11,566 votes (54.7%) against Republican nominee Lisa Williams.
- 2010 Lee was challenged in the May 18, 2010 Democratic Primary, winning with 4,532 votes (82.0%) and won the November 2, 2010 General election with 8,610 votes (56.7%) against Republican nominee Carl Lay.
