= Patesville, Kentucky =

Unincorporated community in Kentucky, United States

- Unincorporated community
- Location within Kentucky Location within the United States
- Coordinates: 37°46′55.2″N 86°43′7.95″W
- Country: United States
- State: Kentucky
- County: Hancock
- Elevation: 489 ft (149 m)
- Time zone: UTC-6 (Central (CST))
  - Summer (DST): UTC-5 (CDT)
- ZIP code: 42363
- Area codes: 270 & 364
- GNIS feature ID: 508779

Patesville is an unincorporated community in Hancock County, Kentucky United States. The community is centered around the intersection Kentucky Route 144 and Kentucky Route 1700.

Patesville had a post office established in 1813. During the civil war there was a battle between Union troops led by John Clark and Confederate guerrillas led by Sue Mundy, Henry Magruder, and Bill Davison. At its largest, in the 1890s, the town had several general stores, a blacksmith, sawmill, hotel, drugstore, a hat maker, and an undertaker. The post office closed on June 17, 1966.
