= Kentucky Route 3005 =

State highway in Kentucky, United States

Kentucky Route 3005
- Ring Road
- KY 3005 highlighted in red

Route information
- Maintained by KYTC
- Length: 10.582 mi (17.030 km)

Major junctions
- West end: Western Kentucky Parkway in Elizabethtown
- To: US 62 in Elizabethtown

Location
- Country: United States
- State: Kentucky
- Counties: Hardin

Highway system
- Kentucky State Highway System; Interstate; US; State; Parkways
← KY 3004	→ KY 3006

Kentucky Route 3005 serves as a northern bypass of Elizabethtown. Locally, it is known as Ring Road. It originates outside the western limits of Elizabethtown at an interchange with Western Kentucky Parkway. The road then takes a wide circuit to the north of the city, eventually entering the city limits. Its eastern terminus is at U.S. 62, here known as Mulberry Street, within the city limits and approximately 1 mile (1.6 km) west of Interstate 65.

Efforts are underway to extend the road to an interchange with Interstate 65.

== Route description ==
KY 3005 begins at the Western Kentucky Parkway southwest of Elizabethtown in Hardin County, heading northwest on four-lane divided Ring Road. From the western terminus, the roadway heads northwest through farmland with some development, coming to an intersection with US 62. Following this intersection, the route continues north as a five-lane road with a center left-turn lane through agricultural and industrial areas, crossing a Paducah and Louisville Railway line. KY 3005 heads north-northeast through more commercial development, intersecting KY 1357. The road runs north through farmland with some woods, curving northeast and reaching a junction with KY 1600. After this intersection, the route passes through more rural areas before heading east into business areas and intersecting US 31W. KY 3005 runs past more commercial establishments before heading through a mix of farmland and woodland with some development. The road comes to an intersection with KY 251 and makes a turn to the south, passing through areas of residences and businesses. KY 3005 comes to its eastern terminus at an intersection with US 62/KY 61 in the eastern part of Elizabethtown. The State of Kentucky is developing plans to extend Ring Road on the south side of Elizabethtown west to I-65 and US 31W.

== Major intersections ==
The entire route is in Hardin County.

Location	mi	km	Destinations	Notes
	0.000	0.000	Western Kentucky Parkway	Western Kentucky Parkway exit 133
	1.388	2.234	KY 1904 (Bacon Creek Road)	
Elizabethtown	1.908	3.071	US 62 (Leitchfield Road)	
Elizabethtown	3.656	5.884	KY 1357 (St. John Road)	
	5.247	8.444	KY 1600 (Rineyville Road)	
Elizabethtown	6.550	10.541	US 31W	
Elizabethtown	8.828	14.207	KY 251 (Sheperdsville Road)	
Elizabethtown	10.582	17.030	US 62 (North Mulberry Street / KY 61)	
1.000 mi = 1.609 km; 1.000 km = 0.621 mi
