= Old Stephensburg, Kentucky =

Unincorporated community in Kentucky, United States

- Unincorporated community
- Location within Kentucky Location within the United States
- Coordinates: 37°36′52″N 86°01′13″W
- Country: United States
- State: Kentucky
- County: Hardin
- Elevation: 686 ft (209 m)
- Time zone: UTC-5 (Eastern (EST))
  - Summer (DST): UTC-4 (EDT)
- Area codes: 270 & 364
- GNIS feature ID: 499886

Old Stephensburg is an unincorporated community in Hardin County, Kentucky, United States.
