= Kentucky's 25th House of Representatives district =

American legislative district

Kentucky's 25th State House of Representatives district
Representative
Steve Bratcher; R–Elizabethtown
since January 1, 2023
- Registration: 45.2% Republican; 40.7% Democratic; 13.3% No party preference
- Demographics: 74.8% White; 12.2% Black; 5.5% Hispanic; 2.8% Asian; 0.2% Native American; 0.2% Hawaiian/Pacific Islander; 0.1% Other; 4.4% Multiracial
- Population (2024): 44,846
- Registered voters (2026): 32,529

Kentucky's 25th House of Representatives district is one of 100 districts in the Kentucky House of Representatives. Located in the central part of the state, it comprises part of Hardin County containing Elizabethtown and the surrounding area. It has been represented by Steve Bratcher (R–Elizabethtown) since 2023. As of 2024, the district had a population of 44,846.

== Voter registration ==
On January 1, 2026, the district had 32,529 registered voters, who were registered with the following parties.

Party	Registration	
Party	Voters	%
Republican	14,706	45.21
Democratic	13,224	40.65
Independent	2,007	6.17
Libertarian	192	0.59
Green	32	0.10
Constitution	26	0.08
Socialist Workers	10	0.03
Reform	2	0.01
"Other"	2,330	7.16
Total	32,529	100.00

== List of members representing the district ==
Member	Party	Years	Electoral history	District location
Bud Gregory (Elizabethtown)	Democratic	January 1, 1985 – January 1, 1993	Elected in 1984. Reelected in 1986. Reelected in 1988. Reelected in 1990. Retired.	1985–1993; Hardin County (part).
Jimmie Lee (Elizabethtown)	Democratic	January 1, 1993 – January 1, 2015	Elected in 1992. Reelected in 1994. Reelected in 1996. Reelected in 1998. Reelected in 2000. Reelected in 2002. Reelected in 2004. Reelected in 2006. Reelected in 2008. Reelected in 2010. Reelected in 2012. Lost reelection.	1993–1997; Hardin County (part).
Jimmie Lee (Elizabethtown)	Democratic	January 1, 1993 – January 1, 2015	Elected in 1992. Reelected in 1994. Reelected in 1996. Reelected in 1998. Reelected in 2000. Reelected in 2002. Reelected in 2004. Reelected in 2006. Reelected in 2008. Reelected in 2010. Reelected in 2012. Lost reelection.	1997–2003
Jimmie Lee (Elizabethtown)	Democratic	January 1, 1993 – January 1, 2015	Elected in 1992. Reelected in 1994. Reelected in 1996. Reelected in 1998. Reelected in 2000. Reelected in 2002. Reelected in 2004. Reelected in 2006. Reelected in 2008. Reelected in 2010. Reelected in 2012. Lost reelection.	2003–2015
Jim DuPlessis (Elizabethtown)	Republican	January 1, 2015 – January 1, 2023	Elected in 2014. Reelected in 2016. Reelected in 2018. Reelected in 2020. Retired.	2015–2023
Steve Bratcher (Elizabethtown)	Republican	January 1, 2023 – present	Elected in 2022. Reelected in 2024. Reelected in 2026.	2023–present
