= Bill Ark =

American politician (1924–2006)

Member of the Kentucky House of Representatives from the 26th district
- In office January 1, 1987 – January 1, 1993
- Preceded by: Virgil Pearman
- Succeeded by: Virgil Pearman

Personal details
- Born: 1924
- Died: October 26, 2006 (aged 81)
- Party: Democratic

Billie Dale Ark (1924 – October 26, 2006) was an American politician from Kentucky who was a member of the Kentucky House of Representatives from 1987 to 1993. Ark was first elected to the house in 1986, after incumbent representative Virgil Pearman retired to run for the Kentucky Senate. He did not seek reelection in 1992.

He died in October 2006 at age 81.
