= Steve Bratcher =

American politician (born 1970)

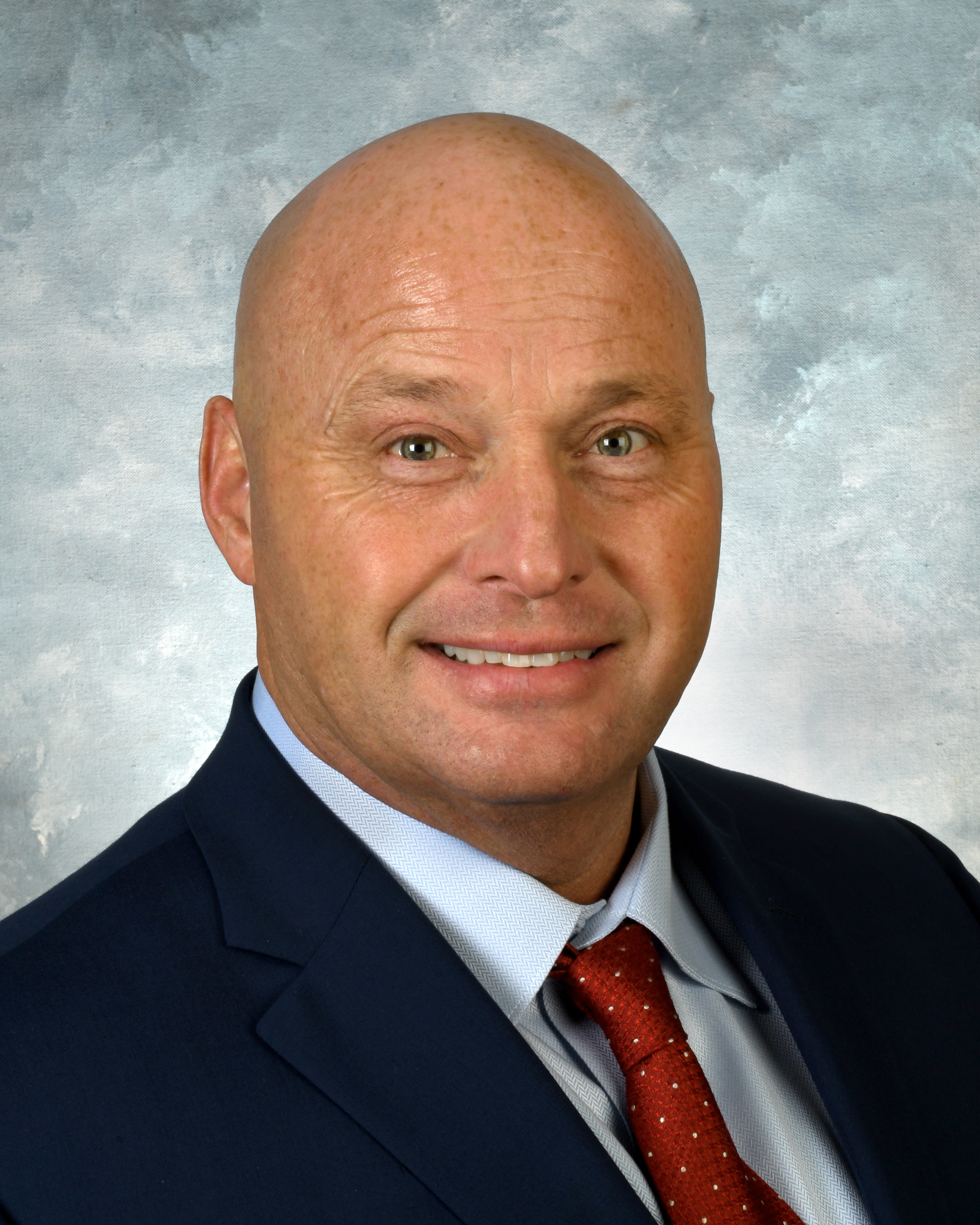

Member of the Kentucky House of Representatives from the 25th district
- Incumbent
- Assumed office January 1, 2023
- Preceded by: Jim DuPlessis

Personal details
- Born: April 8, 1970 (age 56)
- Party: Republican
- Education: Community College of the Air Force (AS); Eastern Kentucky University (BA) (MS); Bellarmine University (EMBA)
- Committees: Veterans, Military Affairs, & Public Protection (vice chair); Health Services; Postsecondary Education; Primary & Secondary Education
- Website: stevebratcher.com

Military service
- Branch/service: United States Air Force; Kentucky Air National Guard
- Battles/wars: Iraq War

Robert Stephen Bratcher (born April 8, 1970) is an American politician and educator currently serving as a Republican member of the Kentucky House of Representatives from Kentucky's 25th House district. His district includes most of Elizabethtown and the north side of Hardin County.

His cousin and current member of the Louisville Metro Council, Kevin Bratcher, also served as member of the Kentucky House of Representatives, representing Kentucky's 29th House district from 1997 to 2025.

== Background ==
=== Education ===
Bratcher graduated from Madison Central High School in Richmond before earning two technical Associate in Science degrees from the Community College of the Air Force. He went on to earn a Bachelor of Arts in police administration and social justice as well as a Master of Science in loss prevention safety from Eastern Kentucky University. Later, Bratcher earned an Executive Master of Business Administration (EMBA) from Bellarmine University. He also holds his private pilot license (PPL).

=== Military Service ===
Bratcher has served four years of active duty in the United States Air Force and over 30 years in the Kentucky Air National Guard, where he presently serves as a Senior Non-Commissioned Officer. He experienced both foreign and domestic operations such as homeland defense during the September 11 attacks and Operation Iraqi Freedom.

=== Employment ===
Bratcher is currently employed at Elizabethtown Community and Technical College as Director of External Technical Training and as an instructor of business and technical courses. He is also a real estate broker, a private pilot, and the owner of a personal care home with a focus on Alzheimer's and dementia residents. He has previously been employed by Honeywell, the Lear Corporation, and Maker's Mark.

Additionally, Bratcher has served on the Habitat for Humanity Board of Directors and is a member of the American Legion and Veterans of Foreign Wars.

== Political career ==
=== Elections ===
- 2014 Bratcher won the 2014 general election for constable of Hardin County's 4th magisterial district with 2,211 votes (60%) against Democratic incumbent Randell Morris.
- 2018 Bratcher was unopposed in the 2018 general election for constable of Hardin County's 4th magisterial district, winning with 3,132 votes.
- 2022 Incumbent Jim DuPlessis, a republican representing District 25 in the Kentucky House of Representatives, chose not to seek reelection. Bratcher won the 2022 Republican primary with 1,593 votes (67.6%), and won the 2022 Kentucky House of Representatives election with 7,537 votes (62.4%) against Democratic candidate Katherine Leonard. He assumed office on January 1, 2023.
- 2024 Bratcher was unopposed in the 2024 Republican primary and won the 2024 Kentucky House of Representatives election with 11,792 votes (62.8%) against Democratic candidate Cherlyn Smith and Independent candidate Eric Parrish.
