= Matthew E. Welsh Bridge =

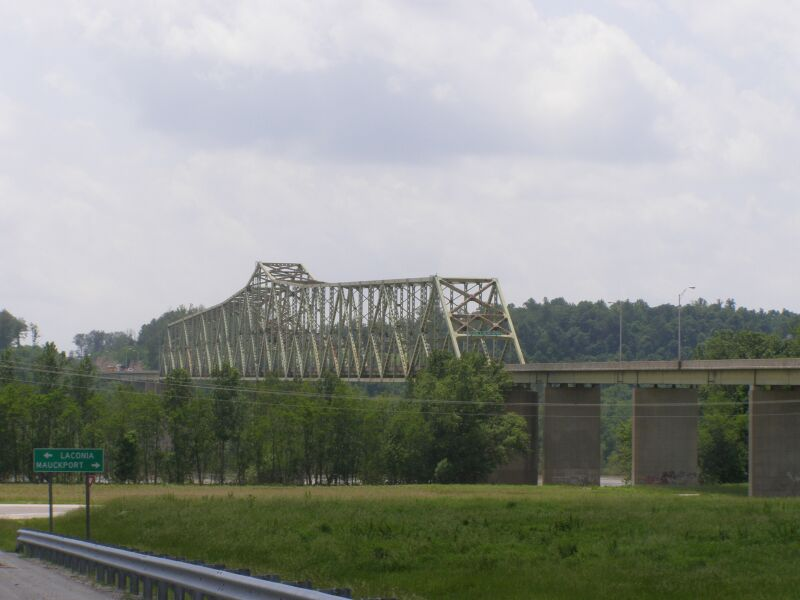
- Coordinates: 38°01′01.52″N 86°11′49.69″W
- Carries: 2 lanes of KY 313 and SR 135
- Crosses: Ohio River
- Locale: Brandenburg, Kentucky and Mauckport, Indiana
- Maintained by: Indiana Department of Transportation

Characteristics
- Design: Cantilever bridge
- Total length: 3,098 ft (944 m)
- Longest span: 221 m

History
- Construction start: August 1964
- Opened: November 19, 1966

Matthew E. Welsh Bridge is a two-lane, single-pier cantilever bridge on the Ohio River. The bridge connects Kentucky Route 313 and Indiana State Road 135, as well as the communities of Brandenburg, Kentucky and Mauckport, Indiana.

It is 3,098 ft (944 m) long and was built at a cost of 5.5 million dollars, financed mainly by the State of Indiana. The truss portion of the bridge is continuous across two 725 ft (221 m) spans. Construction of the bridge began in August 1964 and the bridge was opened to traffic on November 19, 1966.

The bridge was named after Matthew E. Welsh, the 41st governor of Indiana.

Although 90% of the bridge is within the Commonwealth of Kentucky, it is owned and maintained by the State of Indiana.

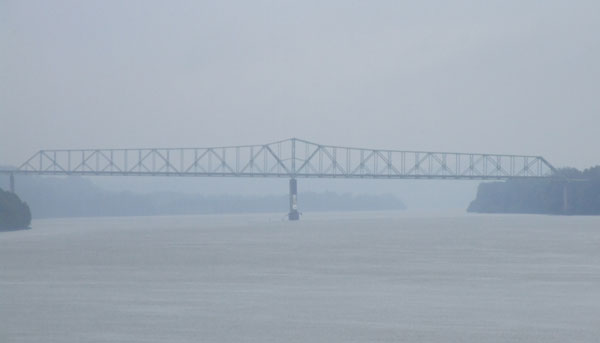
The Matthew E. Welsh Bridge, as seen from the landing in Brandenburg, Kentucky

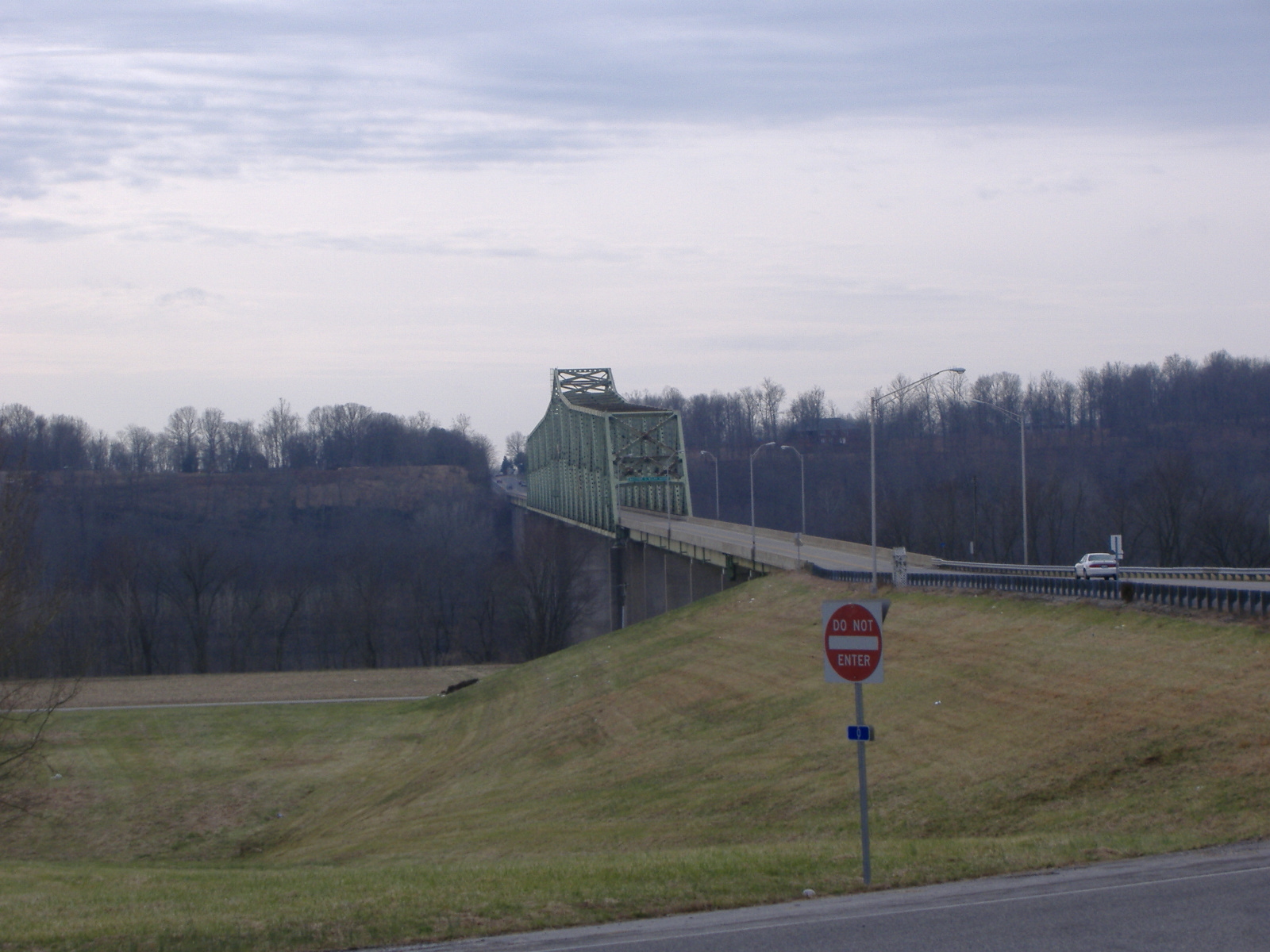
Distance view of bridge from Indiana side

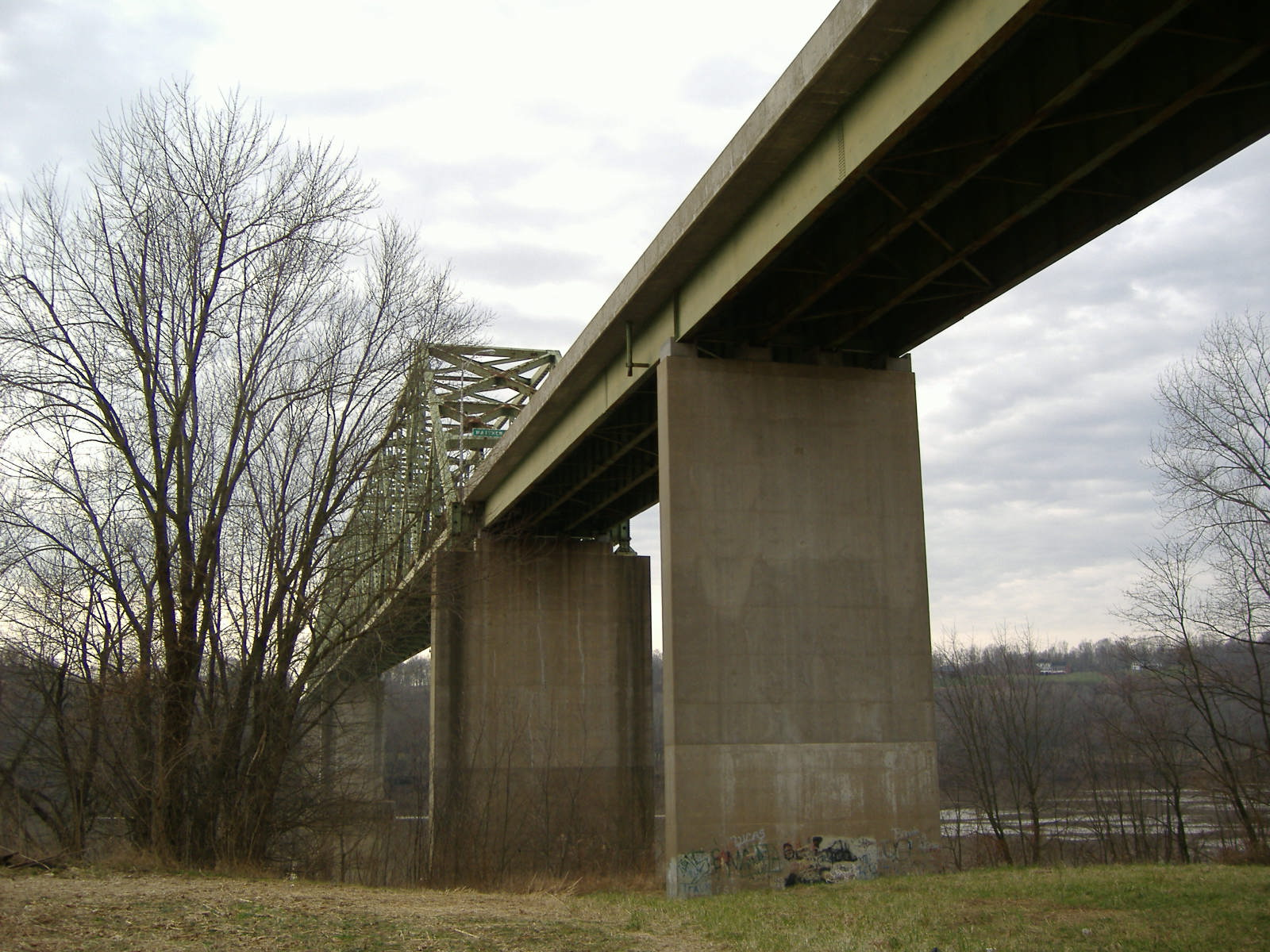
Different view of underside of bridge

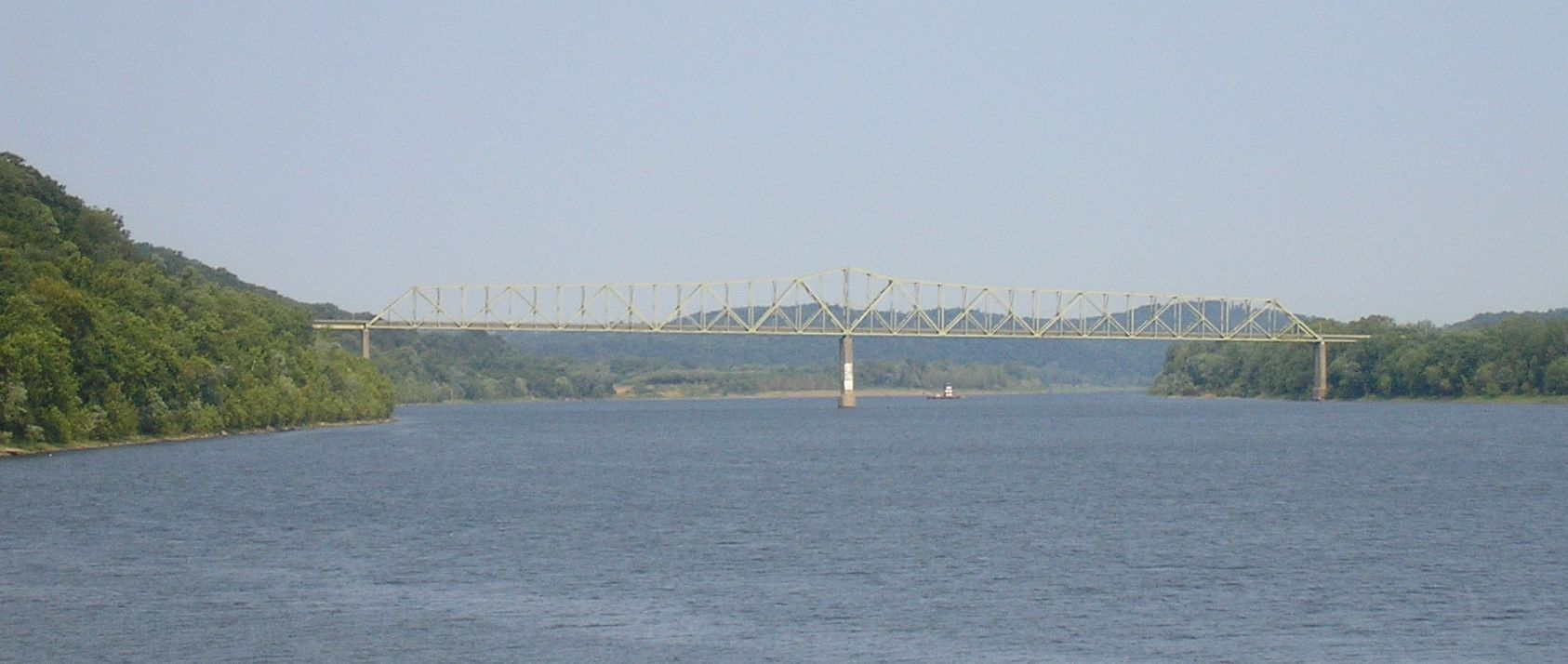
View of the bridge from Brandenburg on a clear day

== See also ==
- List of crossings of the Ohio River
