= Kentucky Route 710 =

State highway in Kentucky, United States

Kentucky Route 710
- Old State Road
- KY 710 highlighted in red

Route information
- Maintained by KYTC
- Length: 8.243 mi (13.266 km)

Major junctions
- South end: KY 428 near Guston
- KY 144 near Ekron; KY 313 in Brandenburg
- North end: KY 448 in Brandenburg

Location
- Country: United States
- State: Kentucky
- Counties: Meade

Highway system
- Kentucky State Highway System; Interstate; US; State; Parkways
← KY 709	→ KY 711

Kentucky Route 710 (KY 710) is a 8.243-mile-long (13.266 km) state highway in central Meade County, Kentucky, that runs from KY 428 southeast of Guston to KY KY448 and Hill Street in downtown Brandenburg.

== Major intersections ==
The entire route is in Meade County.

Location	mi	km	Destinations	Notes
	0.000	0.000	KY 428 (Guston Road)	Southern terminus
	3.119	5.020	KY 144 (Haysville Road)	
Brandenburg	7.066	11.372	KY 313 (Brandenburg Bypass)	
Brandenburg	8.243	13.266	KY 448 (Broadway) / Hill Street	Northern terminus; continues as Hill Street beyond KY 448
1.000 mi = 1.609 km; 1.000 km = 0.621 mi
