= Star Mills, Kentucky =

Unincorporated community in Kentucky, United States

- Unincorporated community
- Location within Kentucky Location within the United States
- Coordinates: 37°35′57″N 85°58′49″W
- Country: United States
- State: Kentucky
- County: Hardin
- Elevation: 643 ft (196 m)
- Time zone: UTC-5 (Eastern (EST))
  - Summer (DST): UTC-4 (EDT)
- Area codes: 270 & 364
- GNIS feature ID: 504267

Star Mills is an unincorporated community in Hardin County, Kentucky, United States. Star Mills is located on Kentucky Route 1375, 9.6 miles (15.4 km) southwest of Elizabethtown.
