= Fighting Dems =

Democratic veterans who ran for Congress in 2006 election

The Fighting Dems is a nickname given to more than 60 military veterans who ran for Congress as Democrats in the United States' 2006 congressional elections. Five of these candidates were elected to the House of Representatives and one was elected to the Senate. The term Fighting Dem can be applied to all non-incumbent military veterans running for Congress in 2006 as Democrats.

Other generic names have been used. Mother Jones refers to the group as "The Capitol Brigade". The Draft Zinni campaign describes them as the "Security Dems" and part of the "Blue Force".

== Veterans for a Secure America ==
On December 20, 2005, a group of Fighting Dems met in Washington, D.C. for a strategy session and voted on a name for their coalition: Veterans for a Secure America. On February 8, 2006, nearly 40 of them met again in Washington to gather outside of the U.S. Capitol at an event hosted jointly by VSA and The Veterans’ Alliance for Security and Democracy (VetPAC). The event was led by Col. Richard Klass (USAF ret.) of VetPAC and included Senator Jack Reed (Armed Services Committee Mamber) and former Senator Max Cleland of Georgia, a Vietnam veteran who with the rest of the veterans chartered the Veterans for a Secure America (VSA). https://www.c-span.org/video/?191115-1/congressional-campaigns-veterans.

== Philosophy ==
On October 1, 2006, retired Army Major and congressional candidate Tammy Duckworth made the weekly Democratic radio address blasting George W. Bush saying "Instead of a plan or a strategy, we get shallow slogans like 'mission accomplished' and 'stay the course,'" but "Those slogans are calculated to win an election. But they won't help us accomplish our mission in Iraq" She explained that the United States needs "a Congress that will ask the tough questions and work together for solutions rather than attacking the patriotism of those who disagree". Further she said, "It is time to encourage Iraqi leaders to take control of their own country and make the tough choices that will stop the civil war and stabilize the country."

== List of Fighting Dems ==
=== House races ===
Candidates, followed by state abbreviation and district number

- Woodrow Anderson III, AR-03. Primary winner.
- Ted Ankrum, TX-10. Primary winner.
- Dick Auman, IL-16. Primary winner.
- Phil Avillo, PA-19. Primary winner.
- Lee Ballenger, SC-03
- Rick Bolanos, TX-23. Primary winner.
- Bob Bowman, FL-15. Primary winner.
- Jim Brandt, CA-46. Primary winner.
- Charles Brown, CA-04. Primary winner.
- Dave Bruderly, FL-06 Primary winner.
- Duane Burghard MO-09. Primary winner.
- Chris Carney, PA-10. General election winner
- Jack Chagnon, FL-07. Primary winner.
- John Courage, TX-21. Primary winner.
- Jack Davis NY-26. Unopposed Primary
- Dan Dodd, TX-03. Primary winner.
- Andrew Duck, MD-06. Primary winner.
- Tammy Duckworth, IL-06. General election winner (went on to be a Senator)
- Bill Durston, CA-03. Primary winner.
- Jay Fawcett, CO-05. Primary winner.
- William Griffith, SC-04. Primary winner.
- David Harris, TX-06. Primary winner.
- Tom Hayhurst, IN-03. Primary winner.
- Doctor Robert J. Johnson, NY-23 Unopposed Primary
- John Laesch, IL-14. Primary winner.
- Jim Marcinkowski, MI-08. Primary winner.
- Eric Massa, NY-29 Unopposed Primary and in 2008 was elected to Congress.
- Patrick Murphy, PA-08. General election winner
- Jim Nelson, GA-01. Primary winner.
- Dave Patlak, FL-18th. Primary winner.
- John Rinaldi, CA-52. Primary winner.
- Joe Roberts, FL-1. Primary winner.
- Doctor Arjinderpal Sekhon CA-02. Primary winner.
- Joe Sestak, PA-07. General election winner.
- Rich Sexton, NJ-03. Primary winner.
- Bob Shamansky, OH-12. Primary winner.
- Richard Siferd, OH-04. Primary winner.
- Dennis Spivack, DE-01. Primary winner.
- Charlie Thompson, TX-05. Primary winner.
- Tim Walz, MN-01 General election winner (went on to be a Governor and Nominee for Vice President)
- Steve Waterworth IL-18. Primary winner.
- Roger Waun, TX-13. Primary winner.
- Mike Weaver, KY-02. Primary winner.
- Craig Weber, NC-03. Primary winner.
- George D. Weber (MO-02) website. Primary winner.
- Al Weed, VA-05 See: Virginia U.S. House election, 2006
- Bill Winter, CO-06. Primary winner.

=== Senate races ===
- Jim Webb, Decorated Vietnam War Combat Veteran, Marine, and former Secretary of the Navy who won the Virginia senate race.
- Jack Carter, Navy Vietnam War Veteran, ran unsuccessfully for Senate in Nevada. Primary winner.

== 2006 results ==
Around 9:20 p.m. on Election Day, Speaker-of-the-House-elect Nancy Pelosi came out and addressed the crowd;

... let's hear it for our candidates all across the country -- our fighting Dems, our vets who are running!...All across the board these candidates have excellent credentials, great ideals, and they are, again, fighters for the future. Let's hear it for our candidates!

The challengers in the House who managed to defeat their incumbents were Chris Carney (PA-10), Patrick Murphy (PA-08), Joe Sestak (PA-07), and Tim Walz (MN-01). Additionally, Phil Hare (IL-17) was elected to succeed fellow Democrat Lane Evans. In the Senate, Jim Webb (VA) was elected. A post-election analysis revealed that while the Democratic veteran candidates were the most salient in 2006, Republican veteran candidates enjoyed higher vote shares that year on average.

== See also ==
- The Veterans’ Alliance for Security and Democracy
