= Kentucky Route 448 =

State highway in Kentucky, United States

Kentucky Route 448
- KY 448 highlighted in red

Route information
- Maintained by KYTC
- Length: 3.056 mi (4.918 km)

Major junctions
- South end: KY 313 in Brandenburg
- KY 710 in Brandenburg; KY 228 in Brandenburg
- North end: KY 79 / KY 313 in Brandenburg

Location
- Country: United States
- State: Kentucky
- Counties: Meade

Highway system
- Kentucky State Highway System; Interstate; US; State; Parkways
← KY 447	→ KY 449

Kentucky Route 448 (KY 448) is a 3.056-mile-long (4.918 km) state highway located in Brandenburg, Kentucky. It serves the immediate downtown area.

== Route description ==
KY 448 begins at KY 313 on the southeast side of Brandenburg. From there, KY 448 turns right and travels to the north-northwest. It passes Brandenburg Primary School and David T. Wilson Elementary School. The highway then passes Meade Olin Park and intersects the northern terminus of KY 710 (Old State Road). This intersection is just to the north-northeast of Meade County High School. It curves to the northwest and passes Ramsey Field and intersects the southern terminus of KY 2204 (Main Street). The highway passes the Meade County Chamber of Commerce and curves to the west-southwest. It intersects the eastern terminus of KY 228 (High Street) and curves to the southwest. One block later, it intersects the eastern terminus of KY 1692 (Hillcrest Drive). It passes a U.S. Post Office and the Brandenburg Police Department before it travels just to the west of Meade County High School. It travels through Cap Anderson Cemetery. A short distance later, it meets its northern terminus, an intersection with the northern terminus of KY 79 and KY 313 (By Pass Road).

== History ==
KY 448 was formed in 1954 when US 60 was rerouted off of this road, but began at Kentucky Route 144 northwest of Buck Grove. However, in August 2016, Kentucky Route 313 was extended to replace most of the southern end of KY 448 up to the Brandenburg Bypass, truncating KY 448 to its current terminus. A small portion at the southernmost end was turned over to the county.

The original KY 448 ran from KY 7 near Cornettsville to Leatherwood; this became part of KY 699 when it was extended.

== Major intersections ==
The entire route is in Brandenburg, Meade County.

mi	km	Destinations	Notes
0.000	0.000	KY 313 (By Pass Road / Brandenburg Road)	Southern terminus
1.542	2.482	KY 710 south (Old State Road)	Northern terminus of KY 710
1.701	2.737	KY 2204 north (Main Street)	Southern terminus of KY 2204
1.764	2.839	KY 228 west (High Street)	Eastern terminus of KY 228
1.810	2.913	KY 1692 west (Hillcrest Drive)	Eastern terminus of KY 1692
3.056	4.918	KY 79 south / KY 313 (By Pass Road)	Northern terminus; northern terminus of KY 79; continues as KY 79 beyond KY 313
1.000 mi = 1.609 km; 1.000 km = 0.621 mi
