= Kentucky Route 228 =

Road in Kentucky

Kentucky Route 228
- KY 228 highlighted in red

Route information
- Maintained by KYTC
- Length: 23.8 mi (38.3 km)

Major junctions
- West end: KY 144 northwest of Andyville
- KY 313 in Brandenburg
- East end: KY 448 in Brandenburg

Location
- Country: United States
- State: Kentucky
- Counties: Meade

Highway system
- Kentucky State Highway System; Interstate; US; State; Parkways
| ← KY 227 | → KY 229 |

Kentucky Route 228 (KY 228) is a 23.8-mile-long (38.3 km) state highway in the U.S. state of Kentucky. The highway connects mostly rural areas of Meade County with Brandenburg.

== Route description ==
KY 228 begins at an intersection with KY 144 (Rhodelia Road) northwest of Andyville, within Meade County. It travels in a northerly direction and curves to the north-northwest. It passes Barr Cemetery before curving to the north-northeast. The highway travels through the community of Wolf Creek and crosses the creek with the same name. It curves to the northeast and passes Owens Cemetery. KY 228 then curves to the east-southeast, travels through Cedar Flat, and intersects the southern terminus of KY 1047 (Big Bend Road). At this intersection, KY 228 turns right, to the southeast. It then curves to the south-southwest and begins paralleling the Ohio River. It begins heading to the south-southeast, passing Greer and Bennett cemeteries. Then, it travels through Battletown. In Cold Springs, it intersects the northern terminus of KY 1844 (Liberty Road). The highway curves to the southeast and crosses over Big Gully. It then curves to the east-northeast and enters Brandenburg. Almost immediately, it intersects KY 313 (Bypass Road). It curves to the east-southeast and enters the main part of the city. The highway curves to the south-southwest and meets its eastern terminus, an intersection with KY 448 (High Street/Broadway).

== Major intersections ==
The entire route is in Meade County.

| Location | mi | km | Destinations | Notes |
|---|---|---|---|---|
| | 0.0 | 0.0 | KY 144 (Rhodelia Road) | Western terminus |
| | 11.1 | 17.9 | KY 1047 north (Big Bend Road) | Southern terminus of KY 1047 |
| Cold Springs | 15.7 | 25.3 | KY 1844 south (Liberty Road) | Northern terminus of KY 1844 |
| Brandenburg | 21.9 | 35.2 | KY 313 (Bypass Road) – Irvington, Corydon | |
| Brandenburg | 23.8 | 38.3 | KY 448 (High Street/Broadway) | Eastern terminus |
1.000 mi = 1.609 km; 1.000 km = 0.621 mi
