= Bud Gregory (American politician) =

American politician (1930–2018)

Chester Gregory

Member of the Kentucky House of Representatives from the 25th district
- In office January 1, 1985 – January 1, 1993
- Preceded by: Allene Craddock
- Succeeded by: Jimmie Lee

Personal details
- Born: 1930
- Died: October 27, 2018 (aged 87–88) Elizabethtown, Kentucky, United States
- Party: Democratic
- Spouse: Lola
- Children: 2
- Parent(s): Chester Gregory; Lillie

Military service
- Allegiance: United States

Chester William "Bud" Gregory (1930 – October 27, 2018) was an American politician from Kentucky who was a member of the Kentucky House of Representatives from 1985 to 1993. Gregory was first elected to the house in 1984, defeating incumbent representative Allene Craddock for renomination. He did not seek reelection in 1992.

Gregory died in October 2018 at age 88.
