= Payneville, Kentucky =

Unincorporated community in Kentucky, United States

- Unincorporated community
- Location within the state of Kentucky Payneville (the United States)
- Coordinates: 37°59′22″N 86°18′47″W
- Country: United States
- State: Kentucky
- County: Meade
- Elevation: 810 ft (250 m)
- Time zone: UTC-5 (Eastern (EST))
  - Summer (DST): UTC-4 (EST)
- ZIP code: 40157
- Area codes: 270 and 364
- GNIS feature ID: 500299

Payneville is a rural unincorporated community in Meade County, Kentucky, United States. It is a small community of 1300 residents that lies 7.5 miles west of Brandenburg on KY 144 at its intersection with KY 376.

Located near here are the Payneville Petroglyphs, listed in the National Register of Historic Places.
