= Belmont, Bullitt County, Kentucky =

Unincorporated community in Kentucky, United States

Belmont
- Unincorporated community
- Location within the state of Kentucky Belmont (the United States)
- Coordinates: 37°53′47″N 85°42′49″W
- Country: United States
- State: Kentucky
- County: Bullitt
- Elevation: 456 ft (139 m)
- Time zone: UTC-5 (Eastern (EST))
  - Summer (DST): UTC-4 (EST)
- GNIS feature ID: 486830

Belmont is an unincorporated community located in Bullitt County, Kentucky, United States.

== History ==
Belmont was a station on the railroad. A post office was established at Belmont in 1854.
