= Garrett, Meade County, Kentucky =

Unincorporated community in Kentucky, United States

Garrett, Kentucky
- Unincorporated community
- Location within Kentucky Location within the United States
- Coordinates: 37°53′52″N 86°06′47″W
- Country: United States
- State: Kentucky
- County: Meade
- Elevation: 686 ft (209 m)
- Time zone: UTC-5 (Eastern (EST))
  - Summer (DST): UTC-4 (EDT)
- GNIS feature ID: 492718

Garrett is an unincorporated community in Meade County, Kentucky, United States.
