= Vine Grove, Kentucky =

- City
- Location of Vine Grove in Hardin County, Kentucky.
- Coordinates: 37°48′43″N 85°58′48″W
- Country: United States
- State: Kentucky
- County: Hardin

Government
  - Mayor: Pam Ogden

Area
  - Total: 6.94 sq mi (17.97 km^{2})
  - Land: 6.86 sq mi (17.78 km^{2})
  - Water: 0.073 sq mi (0.19 km^{2})
- Elevation: 682 ft (208 m)

Population (2020)
  - Total: 6,559
  - Estimate (2022): 6,880
  - Density: 955/sq mi (368.8/km^{2})
- Time zone: UTC-5 (Eastern (EST))
  - Summer (DST): UTC-4 (EDT)
- ZIP code: 40175
- Area codes: 270 & 364
- FIPS code: 21-79734
- GNIS feature ID: 0506053
- Website: www.vinegrove.org

Vine Grove is a home rule-class city in Hardin County, Kentucky, United States. The population was 6,559 as of the 2020 Census, up from 4,520 at the 2010 census. It is part of the Elizabethtown-Fort–Fort Knox Metropolitan Statistical Area.

== Geography ==
Vine Grove is located in northern Hardin County at 37°48′43″N 85°58′48″W (37.811971, -85.980006). It is bordered to the east by the city of Radcliff and to the northwest by Meade County. Kentucky Route 144 is the city's Main Street, and Kentucky Route 313 (Joe Prather Highway) runs through the northern part of the city. Elizabethtown, the Hardin County seat, is 11 miles (18 km) to the southeast, and Brandenburg on the Ohio River is 18 miles (29 km) to the northwest. Fort Knox is 5 miles (8 km) to the northeast, on the other side of Radcliff.

According to the United States Census Bureau, Vine Grove has a total area of 4.7 square miles (12.2 km^{2}), of which 4.7 square miles (12.1 km^{2}) are land and 0.04 square miles (0.1 km^{2}), or 0.90%, are water. The city is drained by the Brushy Fork, which flows west to Otter Creek, which flows north along the western edge of the city and is a tributary of the Ohio River.

== Demographics ==
Historical population
Census	Pop.	Note	%±
1890	397		—
1900	427		7.6%
1910	570		33.5%
1920	594		4.2%
1930	523		−12.0%
1940	822		57.2%
1950	1,252		52.3%
1960	2,435		94.5%
1970	2,987		22.7%
1980	3,648		22.1%
1990	3,586		−1.7%
2000	4,169		16.3%
2010	4,520		8.4%
2020	6,559		45.1%
2024 (est.)	6,933		5.7%
U.S. Decennial Census

=== 2020 census ===
As of the 2020 census, Vine Grove had a population of 6,559. The median age was 39.1 years. 24.9% of residents were under the age of 18 and 13.7% of residents were 65 years of age or older. For every 100 females there were 93.7 males, and for every 100 females age 18 and over there were 90.4 males age 18 and over.

93.8% of residents lived in urban areas, while 6.2% lived in rural areas.

There were 2,563 households in Vine Grove, of which 34.2% had children under the age of 18 living in them. Of all households, 49.7% were married-couple households, 15.6% were households with a male householder and no spouse or partner present, and 28.4% were households with a female householder and no spouse or partner present. About 26.2% of all households were made up of individuals and 9.4% had someone living alone who was 65 years of age or older.

There were 2,820 housing units, of which 9.1% were vacant. The homeowner vacancy rate was 4.1% and the rental vacancy rate was 10.5%.

Racial composition as of the 2020 census
Race	Number	Percent
White	4,299	65.5%
Black or African American	1,133	17.3%
American Indian and Alaska Native	29	0.4%
Asian	214	3.3%
Native Hawaiian and Other Pacific Islander	61	0.9%
Some other race	149	2.3%
Two or more races	674	10.3%
Hispanic or Latino (of any race)	393	6.0%

=== 2000 census ===
As of the census of 2000, there were 4,169 people, 1,619 households, and 1,160 families residing in the city. The population density was 707.6 inhabitants per square mile (273.2/km^{2}). There were 1,779 housing units at an average density of 302.0 per square mile (116.6/km^{2}). The racial makeup of the city was 83.31% White, 10.63% African American, 0.55% Native American, 1.73% Asian, 0.31% Pacific Islander, 1.20% from other races, and 2.28% from two or more races. Hispanic or Latino of any race were 3.02% of the population.

Out of 1,619 households, 37.4% had children under 18 living with them, 55.9% were married couples living together, 12.2% had a female householder with no husband present, and 28.3% were classified as non-family households. 24.3% of all households were made up of individuals, and 10.7% had someone living alone who was 65 years of age or older. The average household size was 2.57, and the average family size was 3.07.

In the city, the population was spread out, with 27.6% under the age of 18, 7.5% from 18 to 24, 30.3% from 25 to 44, 23.1% from 45 to 64, and 11.6% who were 65 years of age or older. The median age was 37 years. For every 100 females, there were 92.5 males. For every 100 females age 18 and over, there were 87.2 males.

The median household income in the city was $38,581, while the median family income stood at $43,875. Males had a median income of $31,266 versus $24,634 for females. The per capita income for the city was $17,465. About 6.7% of families and 10.2% of the population were below the poverty line, including 14.7% of those under age 18 and 8.3% of those age 65 or over.

== Government ==
Vine Grove uses a city council consisting of the city mayor and six members who are tasked with "making decisions on spending approval, budgets, ordinances and other issues that may affect the City." As of February 2020, the current mayor of Vine Grove is Pam Ogden. As of 2024, members of the city council are Kristofor King, Lonnie Dennis, Selena Hudson, Mary Dunn, Kathleen Sisco, and Donna Spangenberger. King, who has been on the city council since 2010, won first place in the election, giving him the position of Mayor Pro Tempore when the mayor is absent.

== Notable residents ==
- Nathan Adcock, Major League Baseball player; relief pitcher for the Kansas City Royals
