= Hardin County, Kentucky =

County in Kentucky, United States

- County
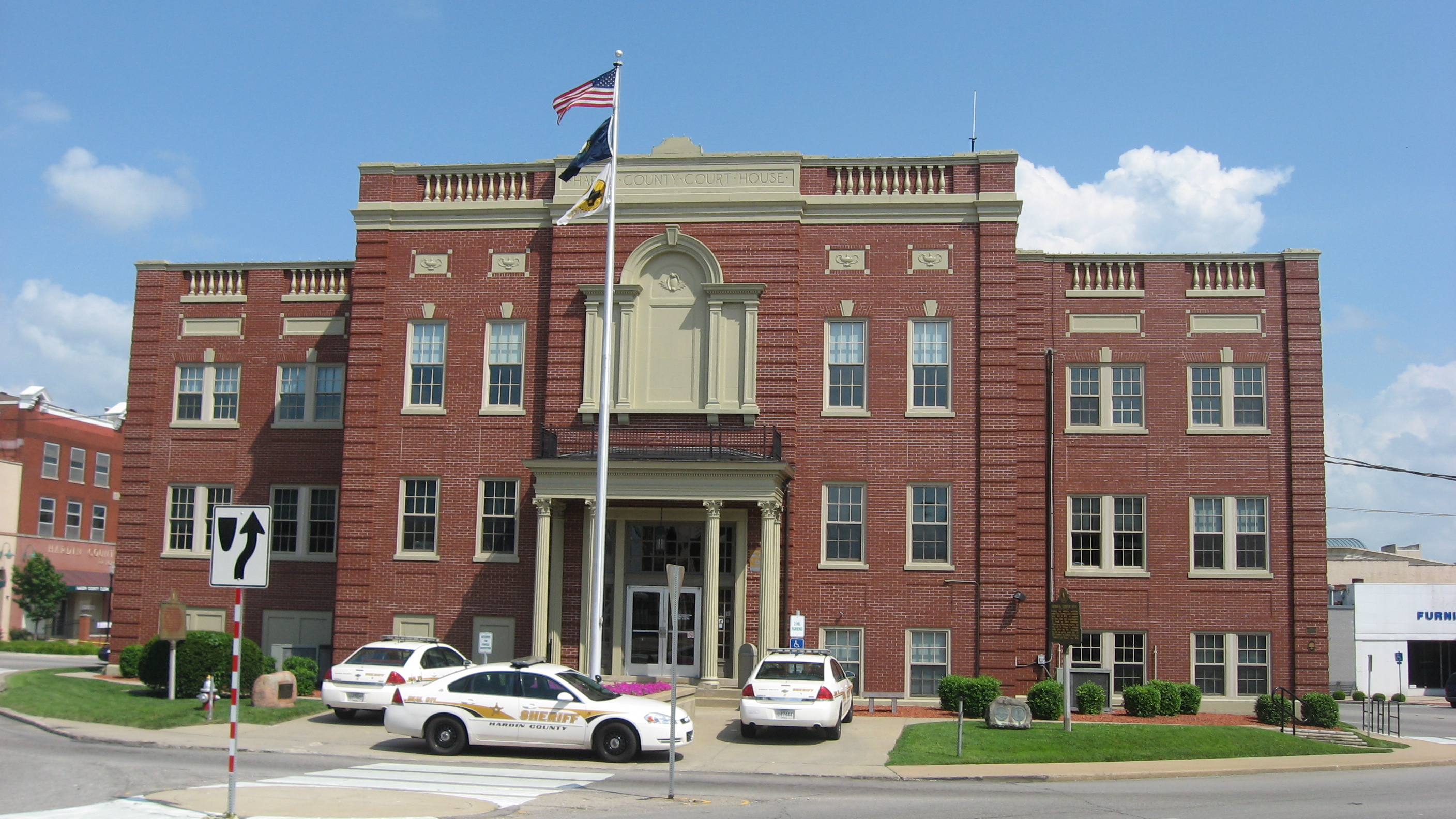
- Hardin County courthouse in Elizabethtown

- Flag Seal

- Location within the U.S. state of Kentucky
- Coordinates: 37°42′N 85°58′W
- Country: United States
- State: Kentucky
- Founded: 1792
- Named for: John Hardin
- Seat: Elizabethtown
- Largest city: Elizabethtown

Government
  - Judge/Executive: Keith Taul (R)

Area
  - Total: 630 sq mi (1,600 km^{2})
  - Land: 623 sq mi (1,610 km^{2})
  - Water: 6.9 sq mi (18 km^{2}) 1.1%

Population (2020)
  - Total: 110,702
  - Estimate (2025): 113,482 ▲
  - Density: 178/sq mi (68.6/km^{2})
- Time zone: UTC−5 (Eastern)
  - Summer (DST): UTC−4 (EDT)
- Congressional district: 2nd
- Website: www.hardincountyky.gov

Hardin County is a county located in the central part of the U.S. state of Kentucky. Its county seat is Elizabethtown. The county was formed in 1792. Hardin County is part of the Elizabethtown-Fort Knox, KY Metropolitan Statistical Area, as well as the Louisville/Jefferson County—Elizabethtown-Bardstown, KY-IN Combined Statistical Area. As of the 2020 census, the population was 110,702.

Hardin County is known for being the birthplace of former U.S. president Abraham Lincoln, though the location is now part of neighboring LaRue County.

== History ==
Hardin County was established in 1792 from land partitioned from Nelson County. Hardin was the 15th Kentucky county in order of formation. The county is named for Col. John Hardin, a Continental Army officer during the American Revolution and a brother of the Capt. William Hardin who founded Hardinsburg.

Courthouse fires destroyed county records in 1864 and again in 1932. The present courthouse dates from 1934.

== Geography ==
According to the United States Census Bureau, the county has a total area of 630 square miles (1,600 km^{2}), of which 623 square miles (1,610 km^{2}) is land and 6.9 square miles (18 km^{2}) (1.1%) is water. It is the fourth-largest county by area in Kentucky.

=== Adjacent counties ===
Hardin County borders nine counties, more than any other county in Kentucky.

- Louisville-Jefferson County (northeast)
- Bullitt County (northeast)
- Nelson County (east)
- LaRue County (southeast)
- Hart County (south//CST Border)
- Grayson County (southwest/CST Border)
- Breckinridge County (west/CST Border)
- Meade County (northwest)
- Harrison County, Indiana (north)

== Demographics ==
Historical population
Census	Pop.	Note	%±
1800	3,653		—
1810	7,531		106.2%
1820	10,498		39.4%
1830	12,849		22.4%
1840	16,357		27.3%
1850	14,525		−11.2%
1860	15,189		4.6%
1870	15,705		3.4%
1880	22,564		43.7%
1890	21,304		−5.6%
1900	22,937		7.7%
1910	22,696		−1.1%
1920	24,287		7.0%
1930	20,913		−13.9%
1940	29,108		39.2%
1950	50,312		72.8%
1960	67,789		34.7%
1970	78,421		15.7%
1980	88,917		13.4%
1990	89,240		0.4%
2000	94,174		5.5%
2010	105,543		12.1%
2020	110,702		4.9%
2025 (est.)	113,482	▲	2.5%
U.S. Decennial Census; 1790–1960 1900–1990; 1990–2000 2010–2020

=== 2020 census ===
As of the 2020 census, the county had a population of 110,702. The median age was 38.3 years. 24.0% of residents were under the age of 18 and 15.1% of residents were 65 years of age or older. For every 100 females there were 96.4 males, and for every 100 females age 18 and over there were 94.1 males age 18 and over.

The racial makeup of the county was 74.9% White, 11.6% Black or African American, 0.4% American Indian and Alaska Native, 2.1% Asian, 0.4% Native Hawaiian and Pacific Islander, 2.1% from some other race, and 8.5% from two or more races. Hispanic or Latino residents of any race comprised 6.0% of the population.

66.5% of residents lived in urban areas, while 33.5% lived in rural areas.

There were 42,933 households in the county, of which 32.5% had children under the age of 18 living with them and 27.1% had a female householder with no spouse or partner present. About 27.0% of all households were made up of individuals and 10.0% had someone living alone who was 65 years of age or older.

There were 46,669 housing units, of which 8.0% were vacant. Among occupied housing units, 62.4% were owner-occupied and 37.6% were renter-occupied. The homeowner vacancy rate was 2.1% and the rental vacancy rate was 8.0%.

=== 2010 census ===
As of the census of 2010, there were 105,543 people, 39,853 households, and 28,288 families residing in the county. The population density was 167.5 per square mile (64.7/km^{2}). There were 43,261 housing units at an average density of 68.7 per square mile (26.5/km^{2}). The racial makeup of the county was 80.5% White (77.8% non-Hispanic), 11.6% Black or African American, 0.5% Native American or Alaska Native, 2.0% Asian, 0.2% Pacific Islander, 1.5% from other races, and 3.5% from two or more races. Hispanics or Latinos of any race were 5.0% of the population.

There were 39,853 households, out of which 37.2% had children under the age of 18 living with them, 53.3% were married couples living together, 12.9% had a female householder with no husband present, 4.7% had a male householder with no wife present, and 29.0% were non-families. 24.5% of all households were made up of individuals, and 8.0% had someone living alone who was 65 years of age or older. The average household size was 2.57 and the average family size was 3.04.

The age distribution was 25.97% under 18, 9.93% from 18 to 24, 27.50% from 25 to 44, 25.60% from 45 to 64, and 11.00% who were 65 years of age or older. The median age was 35.0 years. For every 100 females, there were 100.41 males. For every 100 females age 18 and over, there were 102.54 males.

According to the 2010 Census, the median income for a household in the county was $43,421, and the median income for a family was $55,151. The per capita income for the county was $23,744. Remaining economic data is from the 2000 Census. At that time, males had a median income of $30,743 versus $22,688 for females. About 8.20% of families and 10.00% of the population were below the poverty line, including 13.50% of those under age 18 and 8.60% of those age 65 or over.

== Economy ==
=== Military ===
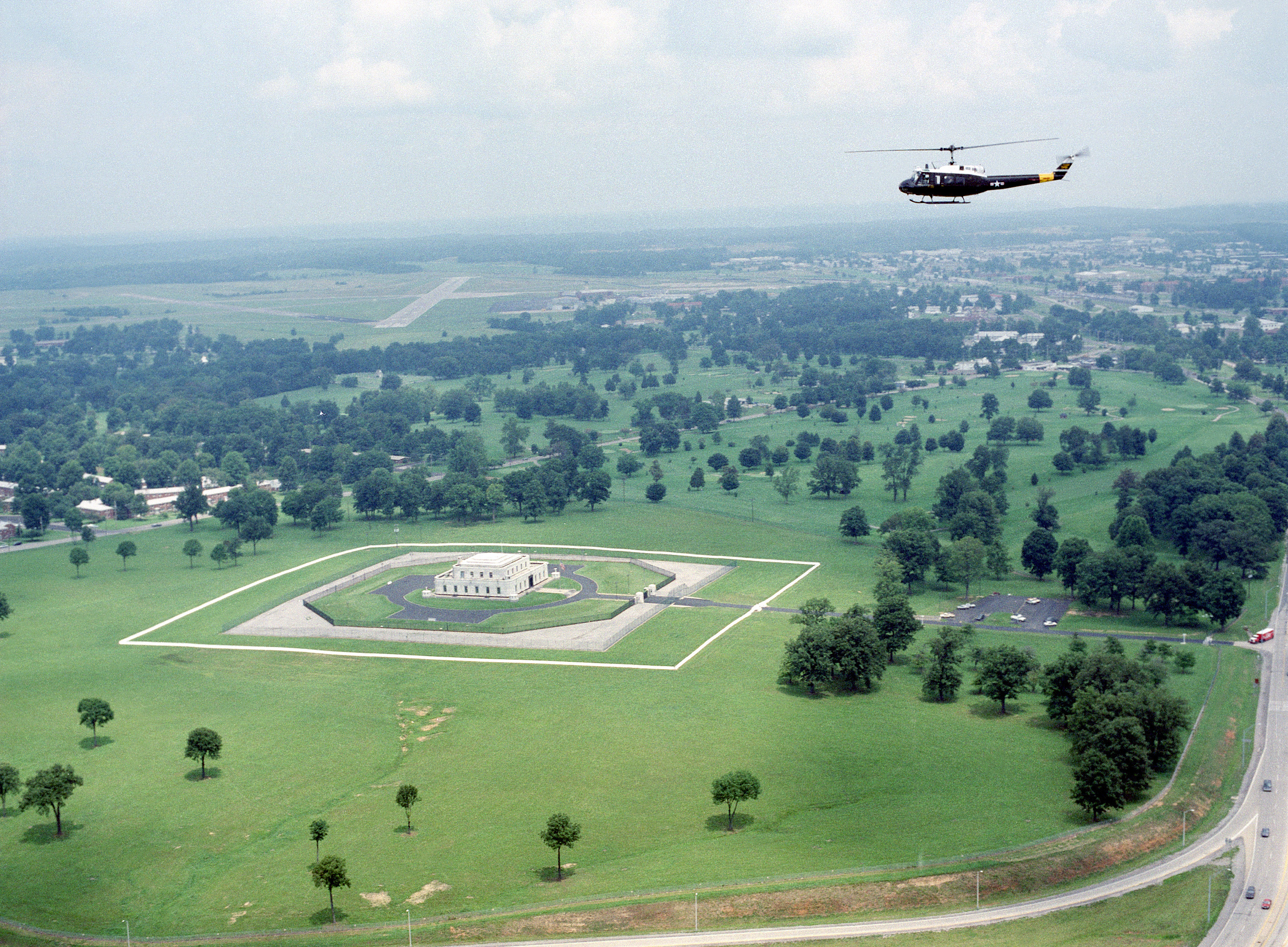
Aerial view of the U.S. Gold Bullion Depository at Fort Knox. Godman Army Airfield and the fort can be seen in the background.

The economy of Hardin County is largely dominated by the adjacent Fort Knox Military Installation.

In May 2010, the Army's new location of the Human Resource Command (HRC) opened. The HRC complex is the largest construction project in the history of Fort Knox, began in November 2007. its a $185 million, three-story, 880,000-square-foot (82,000 m^{2}) complex, sitting on 104 acres (0.42 km^{2}). As many as 2,100 new permanent human resources, information technology, and administrative white-collar civilian professionals will be working there. Officials expect that as many as 12,000 people, including the families of soldiers and civilian workers to relocate to the area as a result of the Fort Knox realignment of 2005.

Approximately $1 billion in new federal and state construction, and infrastructure funds were committed to Fort Knox, and in the surrounding areas by the end of 2011 for Fort Knox realignment of 2005.

Gov. Steve Beshear of Kentucky announced the creation of a task force to help Hardin County, and the surrounding counties prepare for the Fort Knox realignment. The group is "designed to meet specific needs" in areas such as transportation, economic development, education, water and sewer availability, and area wide planning.

=== Civilian ===
In August 2025, Ford announced the opening of its new $5.8 Billion EV-Battery facility in Glendale, which could grow to 5,000 workers when it reaches full capacity, and the start of its commercial battery production.

In December 2025, Ford announced major plans to repurpose its existing EV battery plant in Glendale into a dedicated hub for manufacturing battery energy storage systems, for data centers, utilities and industrial customers, creating a new Ford business. The company will invest $2 billion to retool the facility, which will cause temporary layoffs of 1,500 to 1,600 workers, aiming to reemploy over 2,000 people when the repurposed plant reopens in late 2027.

=== Alcohol laws ===
Hardin County is classified by the Kentucky Department of Alcoholic Beverage Control (ABC) as both a moist county and a "limited dry county". Under ABC terminology, a "moist county" is an otherwise dry county in which at least one city has voted to allow sale of alcoholic beverages for off-premises consumption. The word "limited" means that at least one city within the county, or the county as a whole, has voted to allow alcohol sales in qualifying restaurants. In the case of Hardin County, Elizabethtown, Radcliff, and Vine Grove all voted to allow off-premises sales in October 2011. West Point has voted to allow sale of alcohol by the drink in restaurants that seat at least 50 and derive at least 70% of their revenue from food (including non-alcoholic beverages).

== Politics ==
United States presidential election results for Hardin County, Kentucky
Year	Republican		Democratic		Third party(ies)	
Year	No.	%	No.	%	No.	%
1880	962	32.62%	1,677	56.87%	310	10.51%
1884	901	36.26%	1,531	61.61%	53	2.13%
1888	1,421	38.70%	2,175	59.23%	76	2.07%
1892	1,075	30.58%	1,909	54.31%	531	15.11%
1896	1,885	38.68%	2,848	58.44%	140	2.87%
1900	2,053	39.43%	3,059	58.75%	95	1.82%
1904	1,671	36.83%	2,714	59.82%	152	3.35%
1908	1,913	38.34%	3,010	60.32%	67	1.34%
1912	632	13.69%	2,656	57.51%	1,330	28.80%
1916	1,887	36.38%	3,272	63.08%	28	0.54%
1920	3,334	37.96%	5,382	61.28%	66	0.75%
1924	2,735	38.00%	4,296	59.68%	167	2.32%
1928	4,624	58.92%	3,210	40.90%	14	0.18%
1932	2,801	31.40%	6,047	67.79%	72	0.81%
1936	2,284	33.52%	4,480	65.75%	50	0.73%
1940	2,351	33.16%	4,718	66.54%	21	0.30%
1944	2,831	38.81%	4,436	60.82%	27	0.37%
1948	2,297	34.77%	3,990	60.39%	320	4.84%
1952	3,914	45.73%	4,599	53.74%	45	0.53%
1956	5,050	53.55%	4,325	45.86%	55	0.58%
1960	6,191	54.63%	5,141	45.37%	0	0.00%
1964	3,744	33.24%	7,460	66.23%	60	0.53%
1968	5,329	41.84%	4,470	35.09%	2,938	23.07%
1972	8,740	65.93%	4,060	30.63%	456	3.44%
1976	6,965	45.87%	7,977	52.53%	243	1.60%
1980	9,779	52.19%	8,339	44.50%	620	3.31%
1984	14,293	68.81%	6,329	30.47%	149	0.72%
1988	13,240	64.27%	7,262	35.25%	97	0.47%
1992	12,299	47.38%	9,417	36.28%	4,242	16.34%
1996	12,642	47.50%	11,031	41.44%	2,944	11.06%
2000	18,964	61.79%	11,095	36.15%	631	2.06%
2004	24,627	67.58%	11,507	31.58%	307	0.84%
2008	23,896	59.75%	15,650	39.13%	444	1.11%
2012	23,357	59.56%	15,214	38.79%	647	1.65%
2016	26,971	62.50%	13,944	32.31%	2,241	5.19%
2020	29,832	60.96%	18,101	36.99%	1,008	2.06%
2024	30,672	63.79%	16,572	34.47%	838	1.74%

The county voted "No" on 2022 Kentucky Amendment 2, an anti-abortion ballot measure, by 51% to 49%, and backed Donald Trump with 61% of the vote to Joe Biden's 37% in the 2020 presidential election.

The formal government structure of Hardin County consists of a Fiscal Court along with six incorporated cities. Elizabethtown is the county seat. In 2010, the Hardin County Government, led by Hardin County Judge/Executive Harry Berry, commissioned a study entitled, "Hardin County Vision Project," in part to explore the benefits of consolidated government in the county. The growth of the area and the changes expected due to the realignment of Fort Knox led to the study. Hardin County United, a volunteer-led organization, was established to consider the findings of this project and develop recommendations for the future of government in the county.

Law enforcement and property tax collection are provided by the Hardin County Sheriff's Office.

=== Elected officials ===
Elected officials as of January 3, 2025
U.S. House	Brett Guthrie (R)	KY 2
Ky. Senate	Matthew Deneen (R)	10
Ky. House	Josh Calloway (R)	10
Ky. House	Samara Heavrin (R)	18
Ky. House	Steve Bratcher (R)	25
Ky. House	Peyton Griffee (R)	26
Ky. House	Nancy Tate (R)	27

== Education ==
=== K-12 ===
Two public school districts operate in the county.

- The Hardin County Schools, headquartered in a portion of Radcliff that has an Elizabethtown mailing address, serve K–12 students in most of the county, with the exception of (most of) Elizabethtown and Fort Knox. The district operates 13 elementary schools, five middle schools, and three high schools, plus one alternative school for middle and high school grades. In July 2020, the former West Point Independent School District, which operated a single K–8 school serving the West Point area (cut off from the rest of the county by Fort Knox), closed and merged into the Hardin County district after long-term declines in enrollment.
- The Elizabethtown Independent Schools serve students in most of the city of Elizabethtown; however, some areas are instead served by the Hardin County district. The district operates three elementary schools, one middle school, and one high school. Before the closure of the West Point district, that area's high school students attended Elizabethtown High under a contract between the two districts. West Point students that had attended Elizabethtown High under that contract may complete their high school education there; the last such students are expected to graduate in 2023.

Fort Knox however is assigned to the Department of Defense Education Activity (DoDEA), which, through its Domestic Dependent Elementary and Secondary Schools subagency, operates four schools on the Fort Knox base for military dependents. DDESS has one elementary school (grades K-5), one intermediate school (1–5), one middle school (6–8), and one high school (9–12) on base. After the Army inactivated a combat brigade, resulting in the relocation of 3,500 soldiers and their families from the base, DoDEA closed four other schools—three elementary schools and one intermediate school—at the end of the 2013–14 school year. At that time, DoDEA also restructured the grades at all of the remaining schools except the high school. A new $16-million Fort Knox Middle High School, a two-story, state-of-the-art facility that united the existing vocational school with the current gymnasium, creating a connected campus was completed in 2008, with dedication on August 7, 2008. The remaining parts of the old high school were then demolished.

Five private schools also operate in the county, St. James Catholic School (Roman Catholic Archdiocese of Louisville), Gloria Dei Lutheran School (LCMS), Elizabethtown Christian Academy, North Hardin Christian School, and Hardin Christian Academy.

=== Postsecondary education ===
Elizabethtown is home to Elizabethtown Community and Technical College, a member of the Kentucky Community and Technical College System.

- Elizabethtown Community and Technical College – Home Page

== Communities ==
=== Cities ===
- Elizabethtown (county seat)
- Muldraugh (mostly in Meade County)
- Radcliff
- Sonora
- Upton (partly in LaRue County)
- Vine Grove
- West Point

=== Census-designated places ===
- Cecilia
- Fort Knox, a military base (partly in Meade County and Bullitt County, although all of the base housing is in Hardin County)
- Rineyville

=== Unincorporated communities ===
- Big Spring (partly in Breckinridge County in the Central Time Zone and Meade County in the Eastern Time Zone)
- Blue Ball
- Colesburg
- Dever Hollow
- Eastview
- Glendale
- Harcourt
- Howell Spring
- Hardin Springs
- Howe Valley
- Mill Creek
- New Fruit
- Nolin
- Old Stephensburg
- Quaker Valley
- Red Mills
- St. John
- Star Mills
- Stephensburg
- Summitt
- Tip Top
- Tunnel Hill
- Vertrees
- White Mills
- Youngers Creek

== See also ==
- Louisville/Jefferson County–Elizabethtown–Bardstown, KY-IN Combined Statistical Area
- National Register of Historic Places listings in Hardin County, Kentucky
