= Radcliff, Kentucky =

- City
- Flag

- Location of Radcliff in Hardin County, Kentucky.
- Coordinates: 37°49′48″N 85°56′44″W
- Country: United States
- State: Kentucky
- County: Hardin
- Incorporated: 1956

Government
  - Mayor: J.J. Duvall

Area
  - Total: 13.39 sq mi (34.67 km^{2})
  - Land: 13.36 sq mi (34.59 km^{2})
  - Water: 0.031 sq mi (0.08 km^{2})
- Elevation: 771 ft (235 m)

Population (2020)
  - Total: 23,042
  - Estimate (2022): 22,953
  - Density: 1,725/sq mi (666.1/km^{2})
- Time zone: UTC−5 (Eastern (EST))
  - Summer (DST): UTC−4 (EDT)
- ZIP codes: 40159-40160
- Area codes: 270 & 364
- FIPS code: 21-63912
- GNIS feature ID: 0501516
- Website: www.radcliff.org

Radcliff is a city in Hardin County, Kentucky, in the United States. The population was around 23,042 as of the 2020 Census, up from 21,692 from the 2010 census.

Its economy is largely dominated by the adjacent U.S. Army base Fort Knox and by the nearby city of Elizabethtown. Radcliff's population previously fluctuated greatly depending on the deployments of the units at the base, but the BRAC reorganization of 2005, and the quartering of the U.S. Army's Human Resources Command to Fort Knox has created a larger and more stable population. Radcliff is a home-rule class city under Kentucky law.

== Geography ==
Radcliff is in northern Hardin County at 37°49′48″N 85°56′44″W (37.829918, -85.945541). It is bordered to the north by Fort Knox and to the west by Vine Grove. U.S. Route 31W runs through the east side of the city, leading north 34 miles (55 km) to Louisville and south 11 miles (18 km) to Elizabethtown.

According to the United States Census Bureau, Radcliff has a total area of 12.4 square miles (32.2 km^{2}), of which 12.4 square miles (32.1 km^{2}) are land and 0.04 square miles (0.1 km^{2}), or 0.25%, are water.

The former unincorporated community of Rogersville, named for a local family, is in the southern part of Radcliff along US 31W and Kentucky Route 447.

== History ==
Incorporated in 1956, Radcliff was first settled in 1919, when Horace McCullum subdivided lots along Wilson Avenue and sold them at auction to the highest bidder. McCullum named the new community after Major William Radcliffe, head of the Quartermaster Corps at the newly established Camp Henry Knox. After selling the general store he had opened in the new town, McCullum no longer played a role in its development.

The next significant step in Radcliff's history took place during the 1930s when Fort Knox expanded and dislocated the towns of Stithton and New Stithton, causing various residents and businesses of those communities to move to Radcliff. During World War II, thousands of soldiers trained at Fort Knox and spent their leisure hours at the USO in Radcliff.

Hardin Water District No. 1 was formed in 1953, and became a reality in 1955 with the sale of bonds to finance the project. Today, the water district is the principal source of fresh water to all Hardin County. Radcliff's fire department was established in 1955, with Joseph B. Hutcherson the first fire chief. The Radcliff Civic Club was also organized that year. The city incorporated in March 1956 as a 6th-class city. Radcliff Police Department was formed with officers paid on a fee basis. The population was estimated at 800. Radcliff's population growth over the last 50 years is due to the transient military population, and trends are showing a plateau and decline. At one time, Radcliff was larger than Elizabethtown, but that was short-lived after the 2000 census and more so after the BRAC transformation at the beginning of the 21st century. Starting with 800 in 1956, the Census Bureau reported populations of 3,381 in 1960, 8,281 in 1970, 14,519 in 1980, and 21,961 in 2000.

In 1988, a youth group from the First Assembly of God in Radcliff was involved in the worst drunk-driving incident in U.S. history, a bus collision in which a drunk driver going the wrong way on Interstate 71 hit the group's vehicle, killing 27 people.

In mid-October 2011, the city voted to approve alcohol sales, which began in January 2012.

Former Kentucky state representative Mike Weaver was elected mayor in 2014 and took office in 2015 for a four-year term. City council members Barbara Baker, Stan Holmes, Edward L. Palmer, T. W. Shortt, Kim Thompson and Chris Yates were also elected in 2014 and took office in 2015, each for a two-year term.

The November 8, 2016, general election for Radcliff City Council ended with all current councilmembers reelected except Shortt, who had run for Kentucky State Representative. Radcliff community leader and businesswoman Tanya Seabrooks was elected to fill the seat Shortt vacated, defeating five other candidates. She took the oath of office in December 2016 for a two-year term. Shortt was defeated in his bid for state representative by the incumbent, Dean Schamore.

In the 2020 general election for the City Council, all but two incumbent members of the city council were re-elected. Barbara Baker lost her seat after finishing eighth in the race and Edward Palmer decided not to run for re-election. The two newly elected to the council were Terry Owens who finished second and Toshie Murrell who finished fifth. Incumbent Tanya Seabrooks was re-elected, having finished fourth, but died a month after the election. In a special-called meeting on January 7, 2021, the city council unanimously appointed Aundra Lett Jackson, who finished seventh in the race, as the council's sixth member to serve Seabrooks' term.

The 2022 election for the Radcliff City Council saw incumbents Terry Owens, Kim Thompson, Pamela DeRoche, and Toshie Murrell win re-election. Chris Yates did not run for another term on the city council, instead running as a Democratic Party candidate in the magisterial election for the first district of the Hardin County fiscal court, where he defeated independent candidate Edward Palmer. Aundra Lett Jackson did not win enough votes to secure a second term. Jerry Brown, who had previously served five terms as a member of the city council, and Michelle Harmon, an owner of an ice cream shop and a volunteer in the community, won seats on the city council. Brown and Harmon were sworn in as members of the City Council on December 20, 2022.

The 2024 election resulted in five of the six incumbents winning their bids for re-election, with Toshie Murrell winning first, followed by Terry Owens in second, Kim Thompson third, Pam DeRoche fourth, and Jerry Brown sixth. The sole incumbent to fail to win re-election was Michelle Mitchell, who finished seventh. Local chef and volunteer Maria Bell finished fifth, winning her a spot on the city council.

JJ Duvall did not run for re-election in the 2026 mayoral race for Radcliff, instead pursuing the office of Judge-Executive. Running as a Democrat, he defeated incumbent Republican Keith Taul. Councilmembers Toshie Murrell and Terry Owens ran for the mayoral position, with Owens emerging victorious. Finishing first place in the city council race was Pamela DeRoche, who will be the mayor pro tempore. Incumbents Maria Bell, Maria Thompson and Jerry Brown won another term this election cycle, with newcomers LaQuita Gaskins and Bob Mahanna joining this council.

== Demographics ==
Historical population
Census	Pop.	Note	%±
1960	3,384		—
1970	8,426		149.0%
1980	14,656		73.9%
1990	19,772		34.9%
2000	21,961		11.1%
2010	21,688		−1.2%
2020	23,042		6.2%
2025 (est.)	22,576		−2.0%
U.S. Decennial Census

=== Racial and ethnic composition ===
Radcliff city, Kentucky – Racial and ethnic composition Note: the US Census treats Hispanic/Latino as an ethnic category. This table excludes Latinos from the racial categories and assigns them to a separate category. Hispanics/Latinos may be of any race.
Race / Ethnicity (NH = Non-Hispanic)	Pop. 2000	Pop. 2010	Pop. 2020	% 2000	% 2010	% 2020
White alone (NH)	13,308	12,418	12,326	60.60%	57.26%	53.49%
Black or African American alone (NH)	5,521	5,276	5,594	25.14%	24.33%	24.28%
Native American or Alaska Native alone (NH)	113	148	108	0.51%	0.68%	0.47%
Asian alone (NH)	765	685	598	3.48%	3.16%	2.60%
Native Hawaiian or Pacific Islander alone (NH)	89	165	145	0.41%	0.76%	0.63%
Other race alone (NH)	100	82	194	0.46%	0.38%	0.84%
Mixed race or Multiracial (NH)	822	1,112	1,952	3.74%	5.13%	8.47%
Hispanic or Latino (any race)	1,243	1,802	2,125	5.66%	8.31%	9.22%
Total	21,961	21,688	23,042	100.00%	100.00%	100.00%

=== 2020 census ===
As of the 2020 census, Radcliff had a population of 23,042. The median age was 36.0 years. 25.2% of residents were under the age of 18 and 13.8% of residents were 65 years of age or older. For every 100 females there were 92.4 males, and for every 100 females age 18 and over there were 88.9 males age 18 and over.

97.5% of residents lived in urban areas, while 2.5% lived in rural areas.

There were 9,152 households in Radcliff, of which 33.2% had children under the age of 18 living in them. Of all households, 37.6% were married-couple households, 21.0% were households with a male householder and no spouse or partner present, and 32.8% were households with a female householder and no spouse or partner present. About 30.7% of all households were made up of individuals and 9.5% had someone living alone who was 65 years of age or older.

There were 10,207 housing units, of which 10.3% were vacant. The homeowner vacancy rate was 2.1% and the rental vacancy rate was 11.0%.

Racial composition as of the 2020 census
Race	Number	Percent
White	12,830	55.7%
Black or African American	5,734	24.9%
American Indian and Alaska Native	140	0.6%
Asian	610	2.6%
Native Hawaiian and Other Pacific Islander	155	0.7%
Some other race	754	3.3%
Two or more races	2,819	12.2%

=== 2000 census ===
As of the 2000 census, there were 21,961 people, 8,487 households, and 5,856 families residing in the city. The population density was 1,914.1 inhabitants per square mile (739.0/km^{2}). There were 9,487 housing units at an average density of 826.9 per square mile (319.3/km^{2}). The racial makeup of the city was 62.76% White, 25.65% African American, 0.61% Native American, 3.52% Asian, 0.41% Pacific Islander, 2.60% from other races, and 4.46% from two or more races. Hispanic or Latino of any race were 5.66% of the population.

There were 8,487 households, out of which 38.5% had children under the age of 18 living with them, 48.7% were married couples living together, 16.1% had a female householder with no husband present, and 31.0% were non-families. 26.0% of all households were made up of individuals, and 6.1% had someone living alone who was 65 years of age or older. The average household size was 2.57 and the average family size was 3.09.

In the city, the population was spread out, with 29.1% under the age of 18, 9.6% from 18 to 24, 32.6% from 25 to 44, 20.0% from 45 to 64, and 8.6% who were 65 years of age or older. The median age was 33 years. For every 100 females, there were 95.0 males. For every 100 females age 18 and over, there were 91.0 males.

The median income for a household in the city was $35,763, and the median income for a family was $41,260. Males had a median income of $30,518 versus $20,982 for females. The per capita income for the city was $16,436. About 11.3% of families and 12.5% of the population were below the poverty line, including 18.0% of those under age 18 and 3.4% of those age 65 or over.

== Education ==
Radcliff has two public secondary schools within its city limits. Most high-schoolers in the city attend North Hardin High School, with some zoned to attend John Hardin High School (which is in a portion of the city served by the Elizabethtown post office). There are also: North Park Elementary, Woodland Elementary, Meadowview Elementary, North Middle School, Radcliff Elementary and the all-grades North Hardin Christian School private school run by Radcliff's Fellowship Independent Baptist Church.

Radcliff had a lending library, a branch of the Hardin County Public Library. The North Branch was closed in September 2020. The building that was once the library was sold by the Hardin County Fiscal Court on July 26, 2022.

== See also ==
- Other places named Radcliff
