= National Register of Historic Places listings in Meade County, Kentucky =

Location of Meade County in Kentucky

This is a list of the National Register of Historic Places listings in Meade County, Kentucky.

This is intended to be a complete list of the properties and districts on the National Register of Historic Places in Meade County, Kentucky, United States. The locations of National Register properties and districts for which the latitude and longitude coordinates are included below, may be seen in a Google map.

There are 13 properties and districts listed on the National Register in the county.

This National Park Service list is complete through NPS recent listings posted December 12, 2025.

== Current listings ==
	Name on the Register	Image	Date listed	Location	City or town	Description
1	Brandenburg Commercial District	Brandenburg Commercial District	March 27, 1986 (#86000523)	Main St. 38°00′11″N 86°10′10″W	Brandenburg	
2	Brandenburg Methodist Episcopal Church	Brandenburg Methodist Episcopal Church	August 14, 1984 (#84001828)	215 Broadway; 37°59′59″N 86°10′09″W	Brandenburg	
3	Clarkson House		May 24, 1983 (#83002825)	Clarkson Rd. 37°48′48″N 86°06′20″W	Flaherty	
4	Doe Run Creek Historic District	Doe Run Creek Historic District	December 19, 1978 (#78001386)	Southeast of Brandenburg off KY 448; 37°57′09″N 86°07′34″W	Brandenburg	
5	Doe Run Mill	Doe Run Mill	October 6, 1987 (#87002053)	Kentucky Route 1638 on Doe Run Creek; 37°57′35″N 86°07′19″W	Brandenburg	
6	Goff-Baskett House	Goff-Baskett House	August 14, 1984 (#84001832)	550 Lawrence St. 38°00′21″N 86°10′37″W	Brandenburg	
7	Jones-Willis House	Jones-Willis House	August 14, 1984 (#84001835)	321 Main St. 38°00′07″N 86°10′11″W	Brandenburg	
8	Meade County Clerk Office-Rankin House	Meade County Clerk Office-Rankin House	August 14, 1984 (#84001836)	205 Lafayette St. 38°00′13″N 86°10′00″W	Brandenburg	
9	Meade County Jail	Meade County Jail	August 14, 1984 (#84001837)	125 Main St. 38°00′16″N 86°10′05″W	Brandenburg	Now the Jailhouse Pizza restaurant
10	Payneville Petroglyphs (15MD308)		September 8, 1989 (#89001196)	Address Restricted	Payneville	
11	Richardson House	Richardson House	August 14, 1984 (#84001838)	547 Lawrence St. 38°00′18″N 86°10′38″W	Brandenburg	
12	St. Theresa Roman Catholic Church		November 17, 1977 (#77000635)	3 miles northwest of Rhodelia on KY 144; 38°01′48″N 86°26′20″W	Rhodelia	
13	Edward Yeakel House	Edward Yeakel House	August 14, 1984 (#84001839)	116 Decatur St. 38°00′08″N 86°10′08″W	Brandenburg	

== See also ==
- Confederate Monument in Danville: relocated to Meade County in 2021
- List of National Historic Landmarks in Kentucky
- National Register of Historic Places listings in Kentucky
- List of attractions and events in the Louisville metropolitan area
