= Kentucky Route 1638 =

State highway in Kentucky, United States

Kentucky Route 1638
- KY 1638 highlighted in red

Route information
- Maintained by KYTC
- Length: 9.097 mi (14.640 km)

Major junctions
- West end: KY 448 in Brandenburg Station
- East end: US 31W / KY 868 east in Fort Knox

Location
- Country: United States
- State: Kentucky
- Counties: Meade

Highway system
- Kentucky State Highway System; Interstate; US; State; Parkways
← KY 1637	→ KY 1639

Kentucky Route 1638 is a state highway in Kentucky. The entire route is in Meade County.

== Route description ==
KY 1638 starts in Brandenburg Station at a junction with KY 448. The only other major junctions are with KY 933 and KY 1238, the latter being in Lickskillet. The eastern terminus is in Fort Knox at a junction with US 31W and KY 868. The latter three state routes terminate at KY 1638.

== Major intersections ==
The entire route is in Meade County.

Location	mi	km	Destinations	Notes
Brandenburg Station	0.000	0.000	KY 448 (Brandenburg Road) to KY 933 – Brandenburg	
	2.142	3.447	KY 933 north (Olin Road)	
Lickskillet	5.103	8.212	KY 1238 west (Garrett Road)	
			Otter Creek Outdoor Recreation Area	former KY 3241
Muldraugh	9.097	14.640	US 31W / US 60 (Dixie Highway) / KY 868 east (West Garnettsville Road) – Louisville, Elizabethtown	
1.000 mi = 1.609 km; 1.000 km = 0.621 mi
