= Willis House =

Willis House may refer to:

in the United States (by state then city)

- Willis Fish Cabin at Bull Bay, Placida, Florida, listed on the National Register of Historic Places (NRHP) in Charlotte County
- Fort-Hammond-Willis House, Milledgeville, Georgia, listed on the NRHP in Baldwin County
- Willis-Sale-Stennett House, Danburg, Georgia, listed on the NRHP in Wilkes County
- Jones-Willis House, Brandenburg, Kentucky, listed on the NRHP in Meade County
- Mathias Willis Store House, Windyville, Kentucky, listed on the NRHP in Edmonson County
- Stillman Willis House, Cambridge, Massachusetts, listed on the NRHP in Middlesex County
- Joseph Willis House, Taunton, Massachusetts, listed on the NRHP in Bristol County
- J. R. Willis House and La Miradora Apartments, Albuquerque, New Mexico, listed on the NRHP in Bernalillo County
- Alexander Willis House, Coeymans, New York, listed on the NRHP in Albany County
- Christopher Willis House, Dresden, New York, listed on the NRHP in Yates County, New York
- Henry Willis House, Penland, North Carolina, listed on the NRHP in Mitchell County
- Judge William R. Willis House, Roseburg, Oregon, listed on the NRHP in Douglas County
- Willis House (York, Pennsylvania), listed on the NRHP in York County
- Ashley-Willis House, Williston, South Carolina, listed on the NRHP in Barnwell County
- Willis-Moody Mansion, Galveston, Texas, listed on the NRHP in Galveston County
- Joseph S. Willis House, Park City, Utah, listed on the NRHP in Summit County
- Willis House (Grand Encampment, Wyoming), listed on the NRHP in Carbon County

== See also ==
- Glen Willis (Franklin County, Kentucky), listed on the NRHP in Franklin County
