= Otter Creek Observatory =

Observatory in Kentucky, US

- Organization: Jefferson Community and Technical College
- Location: Meade County, Kentucky, United States
- Coordinates: 38.07307°N 86.016362°W
- Established: 1995
- Website: http://www.jefferson.kctcs.edu/observatory

Otter Creek Observatory is an astronomical observatory, one of two units of the Otter Creek–South Harrison Observatories operated by Jefferson Community and Technical College. It is located at the Otter Creek Outdoor Recreation Area in Meade County, Kentucky, about 25 miles (40 km) southwest of downtown Louisville along the Ohio River.

== Ownership ==
Otter Creek Observatory was founded as and built to be a public observatory in 1995 by the city of Louisville, which at the time owned and operated what was then known as Otter Creek Park. In 2000 the city formed a partnership with Jefferson Community and Technical College; the college has operated the observatory ever since. A few years later the Challenger Center for Space Science Education in Radcliff, Kentucky joined the partnership. The Center withdrew from the partnership when the park closed in 2009.

== Public access ==
In January 2009 Otter Creek Park closed to the public, and the observatory ceased being open to the general public. In 2010, the park was transferred to the Kentucky Department of Fish and Wildlife Resources, and it reopened in May 2011 as the Otter Creek Outdoor Recreation Area. The observatory has never closed; it remains operational to this day and is used by Jefferson Community and Technical College for education and research. The college has not yet announced whether the Otter Creek Observatory will reopen to the public.

The other unit of the Otter Creek–South Harrison Observatories is in South Harrison Park in Harrison County, Indiana, owned by the Harrison County Parks and Recreation Department. South Harrison Observatory opened in 2009, and is open to the public. In both observatories, the location and building are owned by the park in question, while most of the astronomical equipment is owned by the college.

== Activity ==
Since 2005 the observatory has published a newsletter, The Observer. Since 2006 the observatory has been the site of an active research and education program in historical astronomy and history of astronomy. This research has resulted in a number of papers published in educational and scientific journals. The observatory was also the impetus behind, and provided funds and resources for, the "Fathers of Astronomy" exhibit in 2009 at the Frazier History Museum, which featured original works of Copernicus and Galileo. The exhibit was a partnership between the museum, the college/observatory, and the University of Louisville's Ekstrom Library, and was a celebration of the International Year of Astronomy.

== See also ==
- List of astronomical observatories
