= Ekron, Kentucky =

- City
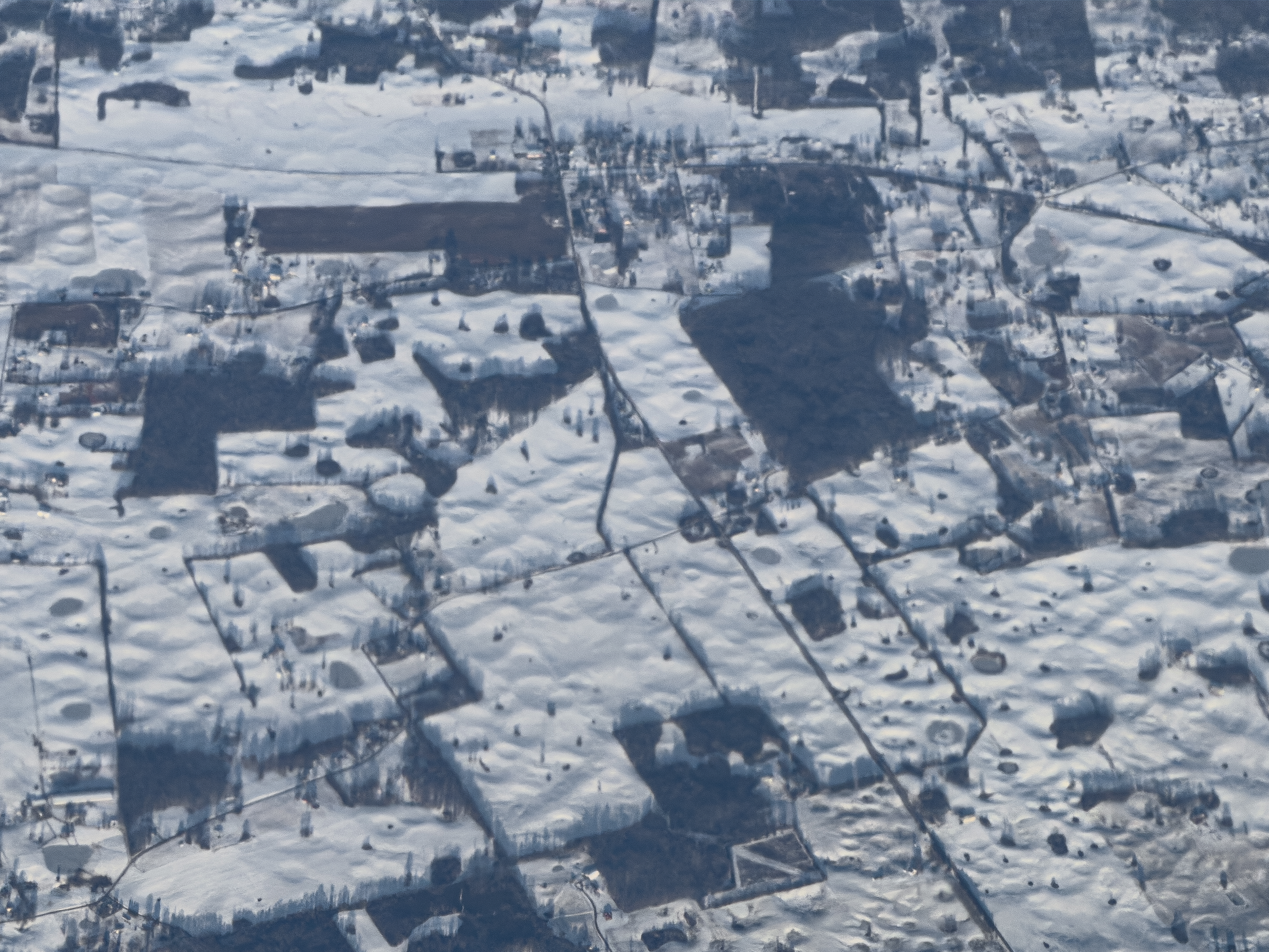
- Aerial image of Ekron in 2026

- Location in Meade County, Kentucky
- Coordinates: 37°55′51″N 86°10′41″W
- Country: United States
- State: Kentucky
- County: Meade

Area
  - Total: 0.16 sq mi (0.42 km^{2})
  - Land: 0.16 sq mi (0.42 km^{2})
  - Water: 0 sq mi (0.00 km^{2})
- Elevation: 660 ft (200 m)

Population (2020)
  - Total: 175
  - Density: 1,077/sq mi (415.9/km^{2})
- Time zone: UTC-5 (Eastern (EST))
  - Summer (DST): UTC-4 (EDT)
- ZIP code: 40117
- Area codes: 270 & 364
- FIPS code: 21-24094
- GNIS feature ID: 0491600

Ekron is a home rule-class city in Meade County, Kentucky, United States. The population was 175 at the 2020 census.

== History ==
Ekron was laid out on land donated by a Dr. Roberts, whose wife named the town after the biblical city of Ekron. It was formally incorporated by act of the state assembly in 1906.

== Geography ==
Ekron is located in central Meade County at 37°55′51″N 86°10′41″W (37.930819, -86.177999). It is 5 miles (8 km) south of Brandenburg, the county seat, and 16 miles (26 km) west of Fort Knox.

According to the United States Census Bureau, Ekron has a total area of 0.16 square miles (0.41 km^{2}), all land.

== Demographics ==
Historical population
| Census | Pop. | Note | %± |
|---|---|---|---|
| 1910 | 168 | | — |
| 1920 | 157 | | −6.5% |
| 1930 | 126 | | −19.7% |
| 1940 | 154 | | 22.2% |
| 1950 | 188 | | 22.1% |
| 1960 | 205 | | 9.0% |
| 1970 | 190 | | −7.3% |
| 1980 | 239 | | 25.8% |
| 1990 | 110 | | −54.0% |
| 2000 | 170 | | 54.5% |
| 2010 | 135 | | −20.6% |
| 2020 | 175 | | 29.6% |
U.S. Decennial Census

As of the census of 2000, there were 170 people, 65 households, and 44 families residing in the city. The population density was 1,498.8 inhabitants per square mile (578.7/km^{2}). There were 69 housing units at an average density of 608.3 per square mile (234.9/km^{2}). The racial makeup of the city was 88.24% White, 1.76% African American, 0.59% Native American, 1.76% Asian, 2.94% from other races, and 4.71% from two or more races. Hispanic or Latino of any race were 2.94% of the population.

There were 65 households, out of which 29.2% had children under the age of 18 living with them, 52.3% were married couples living together, 13.8% had a female householder with no husband present, and 30.8% were non-families. 27.7% of all households were made up of individuals, and 15.4% had someone living alone who was 65 years of age or older. The average household size was 2.62 and the average family size was 3.29.

The age distribution was 27.1% under the age of 18, 5.9% from 18 to 24, 29.4% from 25 to 44, 24.7% from 45 to 64, and 12.9% who were 65 years of age or older. The median age was 37 years. For every 100 females, there were 88.9 males. For every 100 females age 18 and over, there were 85.1 males.

The median income for a household in the city was $28,125, and the median income for a family was $36,563. Males had a median income of $16,250 versus $20,000 for females. The per capita income for the city was $11,300. About 12.2% of families and 17.0% of the population were below the poverty line, including 10.6% of those under the age of eighteen and 9.1% of those 65 or over.

== Notable people ==
- Pee Wee Reese, Baseball Hall of Famer
- Archie Romines, former state representative

== In popular culture ==
Ekron, along with the neighboring towns of Brandenburg and Irvington, are featured in the open world survival horror game Project Zomboid as of the release of Build 42 of the game. Other Kentucky towns such as West Point, Muldraugh, and Louisville have previously served as core locations throughout the game.
