= Otter Creek Outdoor Recreation Area =

Riverfront park in Meade County, Kentucky

Coordinates: 37.944°N 86.037°W

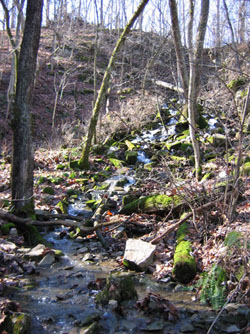
Morgan Falls at Otter Creek Park

Otter Creek Outdoor Recreation Area (formerly Otter Creek Park) is a 2,600 acre (11 km^{2}) riverfront park in Meade County, Kentucky. The park is located near Muldraugh and Fort Knox, along State Highway 1638, near U.S. 31W. Although it is located outside Louisville, the park was long operated by the city of Louisville and, after the 2003 merger of the city and Jefferson County, Louisville Metro Government. Both entities attempted to give or sell the park to Meade County and the Commonwealth of Kentucky at various times over the years, most recently in 2004. The park closed in 2009 and reopened in 2011. It is now operated by the Kentucky Department of Fish and Wildlife Resources.

== About the park ==
The park's namesake, Otter Creek, winds along the eastern side of the park. A scenic bend in the Ohio River, which divides Kentucky from Indiana, can be seen from northern overlooks within the park.

The park is located in the Pennyrile, a geographic division of Kentucky known for its cave-forming limestones. An historic centerpiece of the park is Morgan's Cave, a cave with an actively flowing stream that was reputed to be a hideaway for Morgan's Raiders during the Civil War. The cave is now kept locked for the protection of the bat population that lives in it. Limestone bluffs line Otter Creek and the Ohio River frontage.

== History ==
The parkland was given to Louisville by the U.S. Government in 1947, in recognition of the city's service during World War II. A master plan for the park, calling for the removal of outdated facilities and the development of new amenities, was adopted in 2001.

On December 1, 2008, Louisville Metro announced that the park, which loses $500,000 annually, would close to the public on December 14, 2008, due to budget cuts. This closing date was quickly amended to January 1. According to Louisville Metro Parks, events booked at the Conference Center would be honored through June 2009, but none after. A day later, the state's Department of Fish & Wildlife Resources proposed taking over the park to operate it as a wildlife-management area, which would involve lifting a ban on hunting and fishing.

On June 16, 2010, Gov. Steve Beshear and Louisville Metro Mayor Jerry Abramson announced that Otter Creek Park would reopen in 2011 as an outdoor recreational area operated by the Kentucky Department of Fish and Wildlife Resources, an agency of the Tourism, Arts and Heritage Cabinet. Otter Creek officially reopened on May 11, 2011, but several facilities in need of repair and renovation, notably the Nature Center and Conference Center, remained closed. At that time, overnight cabins were not available; primitive and RV camping was made available when an outside vendor was located. New cabins have since been built and are now available for use.

== Amenities ==
- 3D Archery range
- Cabins and campgrounds
- Disc golf course
- Fishing in Otter Creek or the Ohio River
- Hunting opportunities (deer, squirrel, dove)
- Otter Creek Observatory, operated in partnership with Louisville's Jefferson Community and Technical College
- Shooting range (rifle/shotgun)
- Trails for hiking, horseback riding, and mountain biking

== See also ==
- Doe Run Inn
- List of attractions and events in the Louisville metropolitan area
