= Doe Valley, Kentucky =

Unincorporated community in Kentucky, United States

- Census-designated place
- Location within Kentucky Location within the United States
- Coordinates: 37°57′24″N 86°07′00″W
- Country: United States
- State: Kentucky
- County: Meade

Government
  - Type: Homeowners association

Area
  - Total: 4.63 sq mi (12.00 km^{2})
  - Land: 4.06 sq mi (10.51 km^{2})
  - Water: 0.57 sq mi (1.48 km^{2})
- Elevation: 607 ft (185 m)

Population (2020)
  - Total: 2,270
  - Density: 559.2/sq mi (215.89/km^{2})
- Time zone: UTC-5 (Eastern (EST))
  - Summer (DST): UTC-4 (EDT)
- ZIP Code: 40108 (Brandenburg)
- Area code: 270
- FIPS code: 21-21844
- GNIS feature ID: 2631652
- Website: doevalley.org

Doe Valley is an unincorporated community and census-designated place (CDP) in Meade County, Kentucky, United States. Its population was 2,270 as of the 2020 census.

Doe Valley was originally conceived as a planned residential community in 1965.

== Geography ==
Doe Valley is in eastern Meade County, 1 mile (1.6 km) south of the Ohio River and 4 miles (6 km) southeast of Brandenburg, the county seat. The community is built around Doe Valley Lake, a reservoir built on Doe Run, a tributary of the Ohio River.

According to the U.S. Census Bureau, the Doe Valley CDP has an area of 4.63 square miles (12.0 km^{2}); 4.06 square miles (10.5 km^{2}) are land, and 0.57 square miles (1.5 km^{2}), or 12.35%, are water.

== Demographics ==
Historical population
Census	Pop.	Note	%±
2010	1,931		—
2020	2,270		17.6%
U.S. Decennial Census

=== 2020 census ===
As of the 2020 census, Doe Valley had a population of 2,270. The median age was 44.1 years. 21.8% of residents were under the age of 18 and 19.2% of residents were 65 years of age or older. For every 100 females there were 97.7 males, and for every 100 females age 18 and over there were 98.5 males age 18 and over.

0.0% of residents lived in urban areas, while 100.0% lived in rural areas.

There were 856 households in Doe Valley, of which 32.8% had children under the age of 18 living in them. Of all households, 66.1% were married-couple households, 11.4% were households with a male householder and no spouse or partner present, and 16.0% were households with a female householder and no spouse or partner present. About 18.7% of all households were made up of individuals and 10.7% had someone living alone who was 65 years of age or older.

There were 929 housing units, of which 7.9% were vacant. The homeowner vacancy rate was 2.5% and the rental vacancy rate was 4.2%.

Racial composition as of the 2020 census
Race	Number	Percent
White	2,010	88.5%
Black or African American	37	1.6%
American Indian and Alaska Native	7	0.3%
Asian	23	1.0%
Native Hawaiian and Other Pacific Islander	1	0.0%
Some other race	22	1.0%
Two or more races	170	7.5%
Hispanic or Latino (of any race)	93	4.1%
