= Hog Wallow, Kentucky =

Unincorporated community in Kentucky, United States

- Unincorporated community
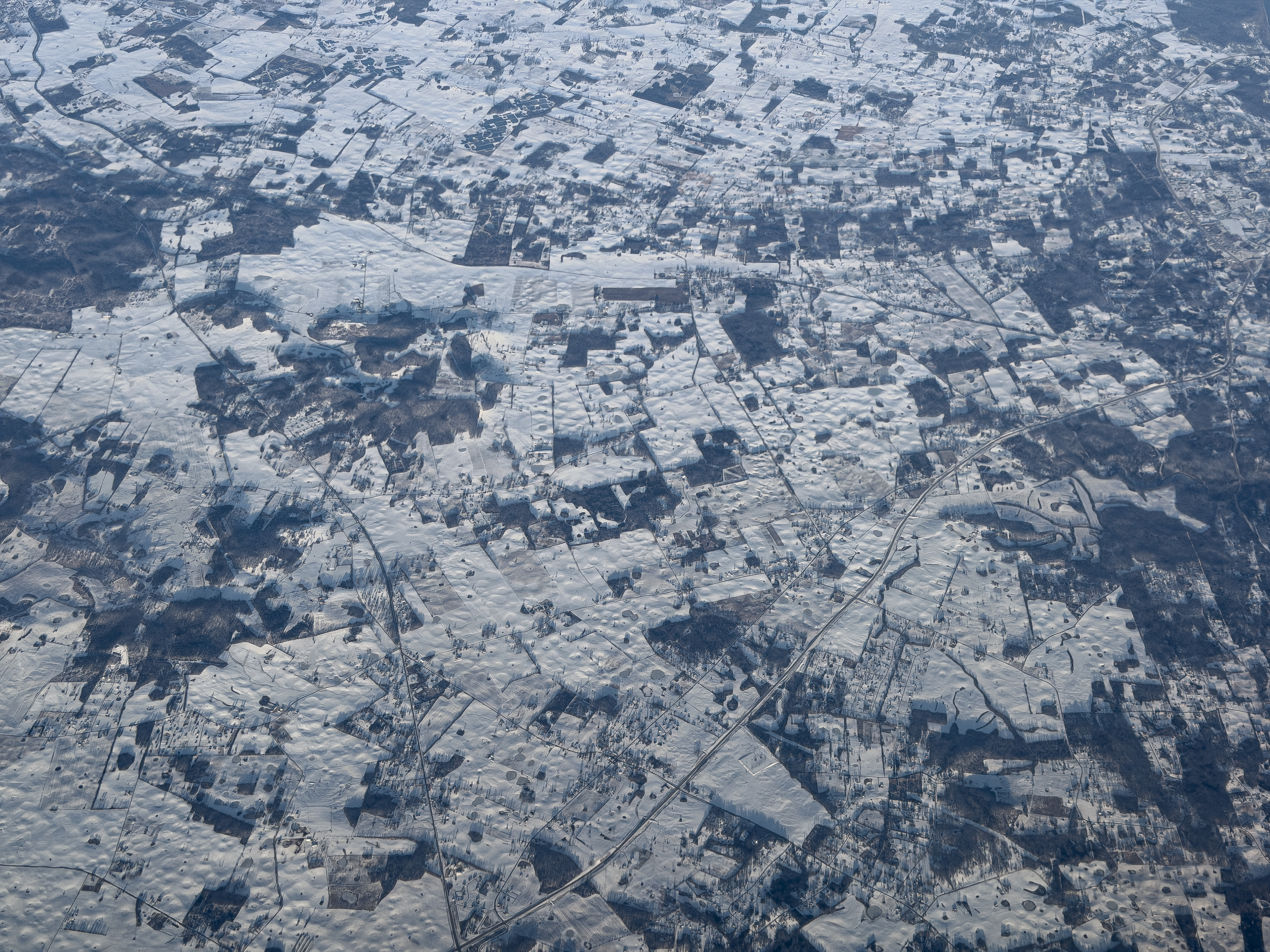
- Aerial image of Hog Wallow facing towards Ekron

- Location within the state of Kentucky Hog Wallow (the United States)
- Coordinates: 37°52′54″N 86°05′48″W
- Country: United States
- State: Kentucky
- County: Meade
- Elevation: 722 ft (220 m)
- Time zone: UTC-5 (Eastern (EST))
  - Summer (DST): UTC-4 (EST)
- GNIS feature ID: 2742587

Hog Wallow is an unincorporated community in Meade County, Kentucky, United States.
