= Rock Haven =

Rock Haven or Rockhaven may refer to:

- Rock Haven, Fresno County, California
- Rock Haven, San Diego County, California
- Rock Haven, Kentucky, an unincorporated community
- Rockhaven, Saskatchewan
- Rockhaven Sanitarium Historic District
- Rock Haven (film), a 2007 film by David Lewis
- Rock Haven (novel), a historical romance novel by Adelyn Bushnell
