= Brandenburg Commercial District =

- U.S. National Register of Historic Places
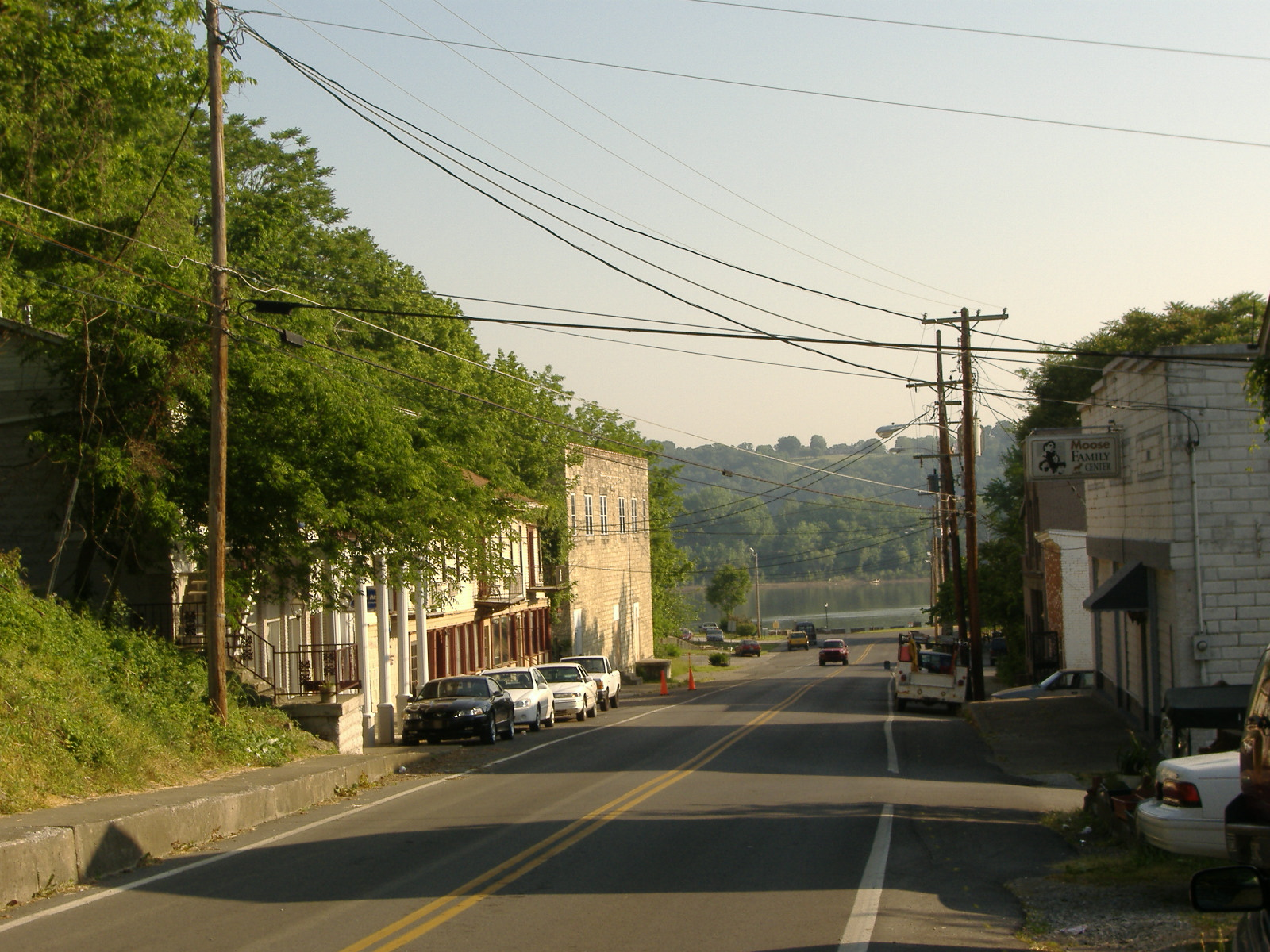

- Location within Kentucky Location within the United States
- Location: Main St., Brandenburg, Kentucky
- Coordinates: 38°00′11″N 86°10′10″W
- Area: 3.5 acres (1.4 ha)
- Architectural style: Gothic
- NRHP reference No.: 86000523
- Added to NRHP: March 27, 1986

The Brandenburg Commercial District, on Main St. in Brandenburg, Kentucky, is a 3.5 acres (1.4 ha) historic district which was listed on the National Register of Historic Places in 1986. It included seven contributing buildings.

It includes:

- Ace Theatre
- Dr. Blair Building
- Brandenburg Moose Lodge (formerly Applegate Ford Motor Company)
- F. W. Casperke Building
- Farmers' Deposit Bank Building
- Hotel Meade
- Meade County Messenger Building
