= Encampment, Wyoming =

- Town
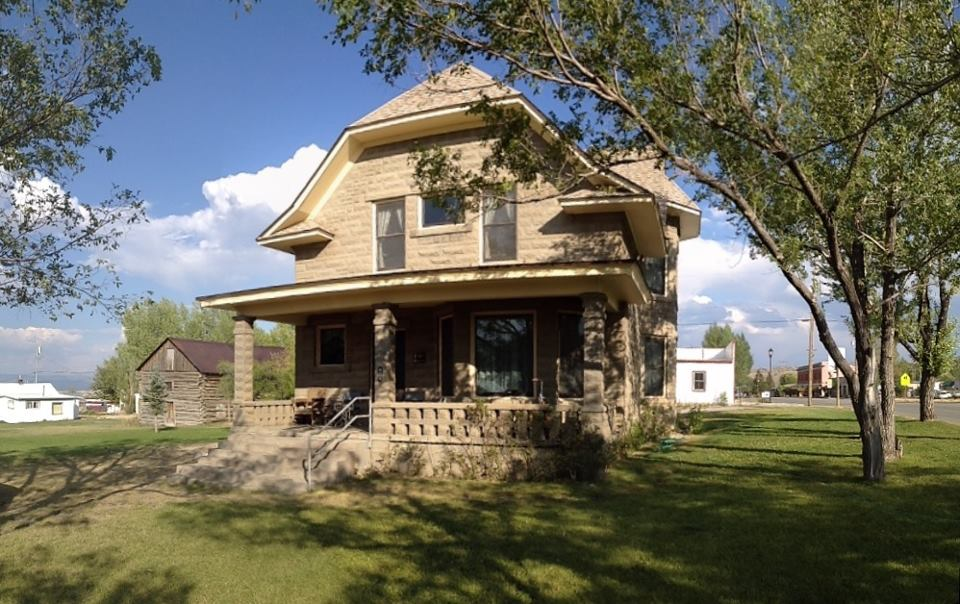
- The Willis House, a historic residence in Encampment that is listed on the NRHP, August 2012]

- Location of Encampment in Carbon County, Wyoming.
- Coordinates: 41°12′32″N 106°47′41″W
- Country: United States
- State: Wyoming
- County: Carbon
- Incorporated: April 2, 1901

Area
  - Total: 1.60 sq mi (4.14 km^{2})
  - Land: 1.60 sq mi (4.14 km^{2})
  - Water: 0 sq mi (0.00 km^{2})
- Elevation: 7,317 ft (2,230 m)

Population (2020)
  - Total: 452
  - Density: 266.7/sq mi (102.99/km^{2})
- Time zone: UTC-7 (Mountain (MST))
  - Summer (DST): UTC-6 (MDT)
- Area code: 307
- GNIS feature ID: 2412700
- FIPS code: 56-32650
- Website: http://www.townofencampment.com

Encampment (also known as Grand Encampment) is a town in southern Carbon County, Wyoming, United States. As of the 2020 census, Encampment had a population of 452.

== History ==
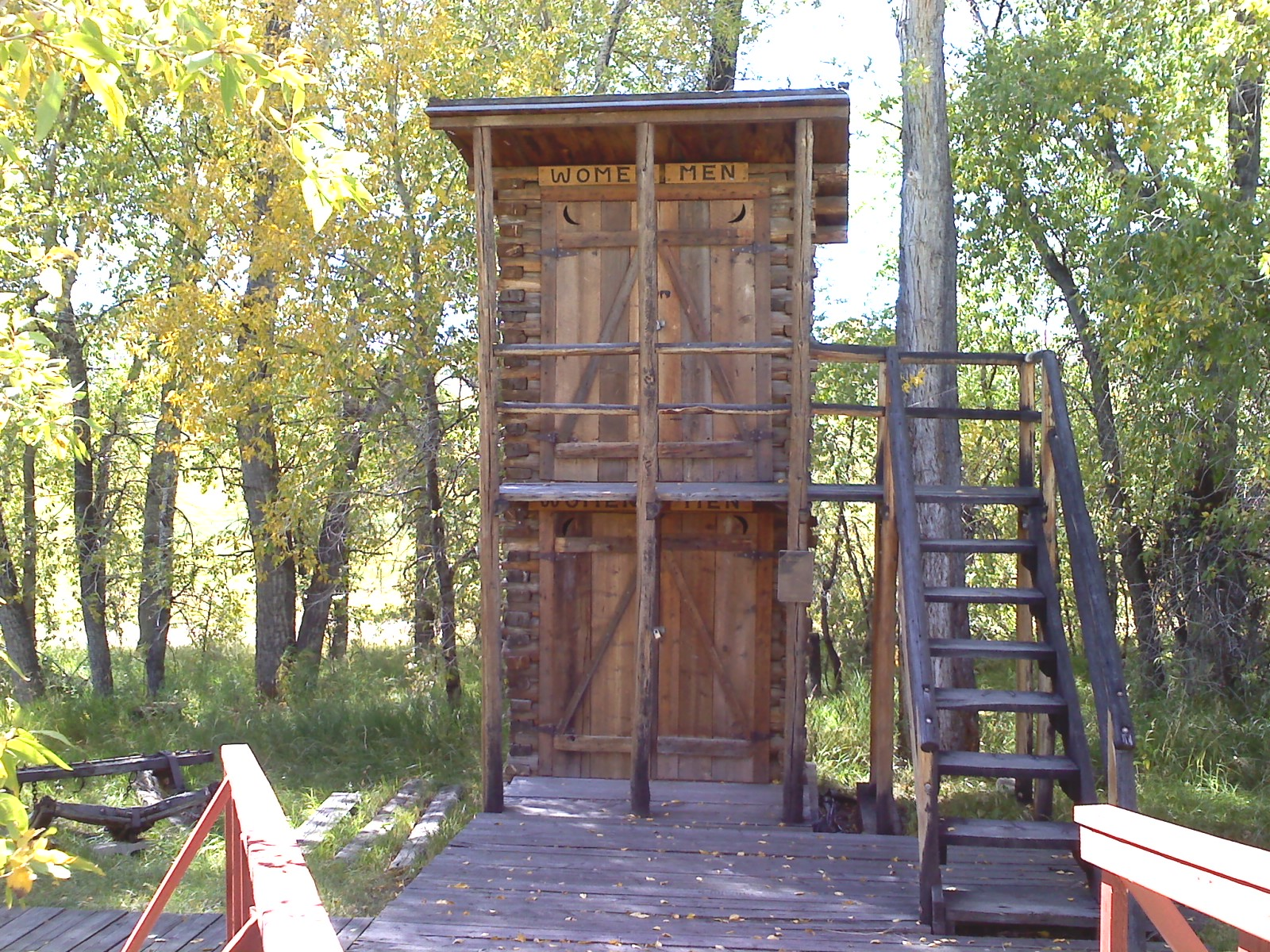
Double decker outhouse at the Grand Encampment Museum, September 2011

Known also as "Grand Encampment", this town along the Colorado-Wyoming border was, at the turn of the twentieth century, a booming center of copper mining and smelting. At one point a sixteen-mile tramway was built to carry copper ore from the mountains into the town for smelting. This steam powered tramway was, at the time, the longest in the world. A sharp drop in copper prices and disastrous fires drove the mining company into bankruptcy. Mining operations ceased in the early twentieth century. A large sawmill operated in the town between 1950 and 1998.

The town's economy in the first part of the twenty-first century is driven by timber, ranching, and recreation.

== Geography ==
The town is between the Sierra Madre and Snowy Range mountains.

According to the United States Census Bureau, the town has a total area of 1.60 square miles (4.14 km^{2}), all land.

== Demographics ==
Historical population
| Census | Pop. | Note | %± |
|---|---|---|---|
| 1910 | 421 | | — |
| 1920 | 230 | | −45.4% |
| 1930 | 209 | | −9.1% |
| 1940 | 331 | | 58.4% |
| 1950 | 288 | | −13.0% |
| 1960 | 333 | | 15.6% |
| 1970 | 321 | | −3.6% |
| 1980 | 611 | | 90.3% |
| 1990 | 490 | | −19.8% |
| 2000 | 443 | | −9.6% |
| 2010 | 450 | | 1.6% |
| 2020 | 452 | | 0.4% |
| 2025 (est.) | 449 | ▼ | −0.7% |
U.S. Decennial Census

=== 2010 census ===
As of the census of 2010, there were 450 people, 227 households, and 128 families residing in the town. The population density was 281.3 inhabitants per square mile (108.6/km^{2}). There were 371 housing units at an average density of 231.9 per square mile (89.5/km^{2}). The racial makeup of the town was 97.1% White, 0.7% Native American, 0.7% from other races, and 1.6% from two or more races. Hispanic or Latino of any race were 1.6% of the population.

There were 227 households, of which 18.1% had children under the age of 18 living with them, 48.0% were married couples living together, 4.4% had a female householder with no husband present, 4.0% had a male householder with no wife present, and 43.6% were non-families. 39.2% of all households were made up of individuals, and 14.5% had someone living alone who was 65 years of age or older. The average household size was 1.98 and the average family size was 2.63.

The median age in the town was 51.6 years. 17.6% of residents were under the age of 18; 3.3% were between the ages of 18 and 24; 17.1% were from 25 to 44; 38.1% were from 45 to 64; and 23.6% were 65 years of age or older. The gender makeup of the town was 53.1% male and 46.9% female.

=== 2000 census ===
As of the census of 2000, there were 443 people, 209 households, and 137 families residing in the town. The population density was 277.1 people per square mile (106.9/km^{2}). There were 336 housing units at an average density of 210.2 per square mile (81.1/km^{2}). The racial makeup of the town was 97.52% White, 0.45% Native American, 0.68% Asian, and 1.35% from two or more races. Hispanic or Latino of any race were 0.68% of the population.

There were 209 households, out of which 23.0% had children under the age of 18 living with them, 56.9% were married couples living together, 2.9% had a female householder with no husband present, and 34.4% were non-families. 32.1% of all households were made up of individuals, and 12.9% had someone living alone who was 65 years of age or older. The average household size was 2.12 and the average family size was 2.64.

In the town, the population was spread out, with 19.0% under the age of 18, 5.2% from 18 to 24, 23.5% from 25 to 44, 36.3% from 45 to 64, and 16.0% who were 65 years of age or older. The median age was 47 years. For every 100 females, there were 115.0 males. For every 100 females age 18 and over, there were 116.3 males.

The median income for a household in the town was $29,444, and the median income for a family was $37,083. Males had a median income of $36,786 versus $19,375 for females. The per capita income for the town was $20,632. About 9.1% of families and 12.8% of the population were below the poverty line, including 19.6% of those under age 18 and 12.0% of those age 65 or over.

== Government ==
Encampment government runs on a mayor/council forum. Encampment has a town council consisting of 4 council members and a mayor. Shannon Fagan was first elected mayor in November of 2022. Her current term ends in 2026.

=== List of Mayors ===
- Jim McKinney - 2003 to 2007
- Greg Salisbury - 2007 to 2023
- Shannon Fagan - 2023 to present

== Arts and culture ==
The Grand Encampment Museum is located in Encampment. It highlights the copper mining, ranching, logging history in the area. It includes over 15 historic buildings and thousands of interesting objects. A research library is located in the main gallery, the Doc Culleton Interpretive Center.

The Sierra Madre Winter Carnival is an annual event held in January. There is a Music in the Park event during the summer.

== Education ==
Public education in the town of Encampment is provided by Carbon County School District #2. Encampment School, a K-12 campus, serves the town.

Encampment has a public library, a branch of the Carbon County Library System.

== See also ==
- List of municipalities in Wyoming
- Lora Webb Nichols
