= Flaherty, Kentucky =

Unincorporated community in Kentucky, United States

- Unincorporated community
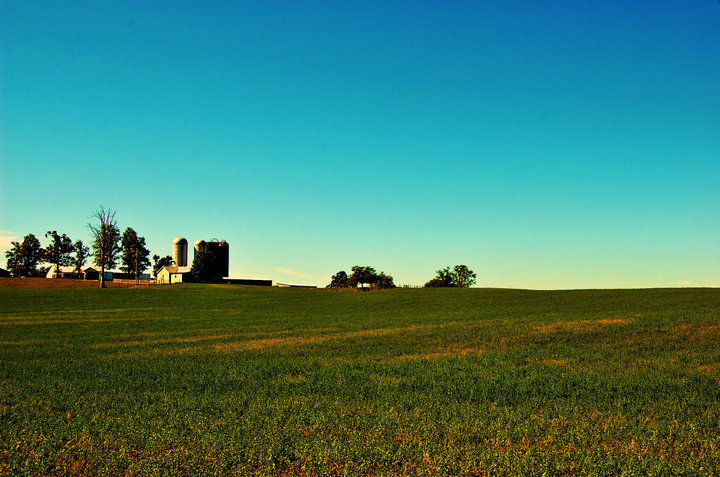

- Location within Kentucky Location within the United States
- Coordinates: 37°50′10.08″N 86°3′57.6″W
- Country: United States
- State: Kentucky
- County: Meade
- Time zone: UTC-5 (Eastern (EST))
  - Summer (DST): UTC-4 (EDT)
- ZIP codes: 40175
- Area code: 270
- GNIS feature ID: 492167

Flaherty, an unincorporated community in Meade County, Kentucky, United States, is located 13 miles/21 km south of Brandenburg on KY 144, at its intersection with KY 1600 and KY 1816. While predominantly a rural agricultural community; Flaherty has a modest business district consisting of a Dollar General store, car wash, banks, and a gas station. Notable locations also include: Flaherty Elementary & Primary School, Saint Martin of Tours Catholic Church, Flaherty Ball Park, and Flaherty Fire Department. Clarkson House is also in Flaherty.
