= Brandenburg stone =

Inscribed stone slab found in Brandenburg, Kentucky, United States in 1912

The Brandenburg stone is an inscribed stone slab found in Brandenburg, Kentucky, United States in 1912, on the farm of Craig Crecelius. The stone contains a strip of linear markings that resemble letters of a script. Crecelius exhibited the stone several times, but was unable to find anyone who could identify the markings.

Jon Whitfield, who acquired the stone in 1965, claims that they are Coelbren, a pseudo-archaic Welsh-language alphabet invented by Iolo Morganwg c. 1791 for use in the ceremonies he similarly created for both the Gorsedd and the Eisteddfod. Other writers have alleged that the stone is evidence of pre-Columbian contact between the legendary Welsh prince Madoc and Native Americans. The consensus of Welsh scholars is that "Coelbren" is a fake script invented in the late eighteenth century by a literary forger, Iolo Morganwg, in his book Barddas.

== History ==
In 1912, farmer Craig Crecelius found the stone artifact in a field near the Ohio River in Brandenburg, Kentucky. The oolite stone measures 29 inches (74 cm) long by 15.5 inches (39 cm) wide and varies in thickness from 1 to 3 inches (2.5 to 7.6 cm). For more than 50 years, Crecelius displayed the stone at local fairs. At some point, the stone was shattered into three pieces.

In 1965, Crecelius abandoned his pursuit of the artifact's origin and transferred ownership to Jon Whitfield. Eight years later, archaeologists examined the stone and concluded that its markings were actually scratches resulting from a natural process. The stone was stored at the Meade county library until 1995 when it was moved to the Falls of the Ohio Interpretive Center in Clarksville, Indiana.

In 1999, the artifact was moved to the Falls of the Ohio State Park Interpretive Center for a year, and then to the Charlestown, Indiana public library. In January 2012 the artifact was returned to the Meade county library, later that year the library moved locations and the building that housed the stone was converted into the Meade county history museum where it has been on display since.

== Claims of Welsh origin ==
One of Morganwg's "peithynen" frames containing his "bardic" alphabet

Whitfield sought evidence that the markings were Welsh in origin. In 1998, the stone was examined by authors Baram Blackett and Alan Wilson, who asserted that the inscription is in Middle Welsh. Blackett and Wilson have also claimed to have found the grave of King Arthur and the lost Ark of the Covenant. They translated the inscriptions into English from Welsh and the Coelbren script invented by Iolo Morganwg.

The claims have been widely circulated and debunked.

== Authenticity ==
More recently, the artifact has been a subject of several books as well an episode of the H2 documentary America Unearthed. Author Jason Colavito has argued against the stone's authenticity, asserting that it was carved in the 19th- or early 20th-century when the use of "Coelbren" in Gorsedd ceremonies and Eisteddfodau were very common among the very large Welsh-American community in North America.
