= Project Zomboid =

Upcoming survival game

- Developer: The Indie Stone
- Publisher: The Indie Stone
- Composers: Zach Beever (formerly); Armin Hass
- Engine: LWJGL
- Platforms: Microsoft Windows macOS; Linux
- Release: Early access; November 8, 2013
- Genres: Survival, RPG
- Modes: Single-player, multiplayer

Project Zomboid is an upcoming survival video game developed by British and Canadian independent developer The Indie Stone. The game is set in 1993 in the post-apocalyptic, zombie-infested exclusion zone of the fictional Knox Country (formerly Knox County), Kentucky, in the United States. The player is challenged to survive for as long as possible before inevitably dying.

In 2011, two laptops containing the game's code were stolen from the developers, resulting in delays to the game's development. Project Zomboid was released in early access in December 2013 and has since continued development. It is The Indie Stone's first commercially released game and was one of the first five games released on the alpha funding section of the digital distribution platform Desura.

The latest stable release is Build 42, which released in July 2026 and introduced changes including animals, an overhauled crafting system, and map updates.

== Gameplay ==
Project Zomboid heavily uses windows and drop-down menus for interface navigation.

In Project Zomboid, the player aims to survive for as long as possible in an apocalyptic and zombie-ridden part of Kentucky known as 'Knox Country', which has been quarantined by the government. The player can choose their character's appearance, occupation, and traits before selecting to spawn within one of five starting towns, the occupation that is chosen also will influence where exactly the character will spawn (e.g. a firefighter has a higher chance of spawning in a fire station if the chosen town has one). On top of avoiding zombies, the player has to manage their personal needs (such as hunger, stress, fatigue, and boredom) to stay alive through resting, scavenging for supplies, and using survivalist techniques. The player can level skills through activities and reading skill books, reading magazines, and watching VHS tapes. The game uses the traditional Romero style slow-moving zombies, though certain zombies are faster than others, and sandbox mode includes a setting for "sprinter" zombies.

The game features a variety of preset difficulty modes, along with a sandbox mode, which allows the player to customize game settings such as zombie population, virus transmissibility, and the rarity of loot. Additionally, the game features a set of fixed 'challenge' scenarios, some of which are set on separate, smaller maps and/or feature unique gameplay elements, like an endless winter storm or a zombie horde which tracks the player after one in-game day.

Knox Country heavily bases its location on the Louisville metropolitan area. The towns of Muldraugh, West Point, Brandenburg, Ekron, Irvington and Louisville are loosely replicated in the game world alongside other fictional locations, such as Riverside. The world becomes more desolate and decrepit as time progresses, with water and power grids shutting off within a month, followed by the erosion and overgrowth of the region's structures. The game also features a detailed climate system that approximates the humid subtropical weather patterns of the area; cold and warm fronts form and shift, causing a wide range of weather events, from warm, sunny days to severe tropical storms. Seasons also change as time passes, so choosing appropriate gear for the current season and weather is an important factor in survival.

Player-made mods allow for further customization of gameplay and are downloadable via the Steam Workshop. The mods range from minor changes to the interface such as visible stamina, hunger, and thirst bars, to complete overhauls of gameplay mechanics, the addition of new mechanics, and custom-made maps and expansions of the current game map.

== Plot ==
Project Zomboid centres around the "Knox Event", which is conveyed through in-game radio broadcasts and TV channels. The cause and origin of the "Knox Infection" is never specifically stated, with characters on the radio station KnoxTalk speculating a variety of possibilities, including a prion disease, an act of God, or bio-terrorism. The infection is known to be transmitted through contact with saliva, blood, and eventually airborne, which the player is immune to. After being infected, individuals first experience a high fever, followed by feelings of anxiety and nausea which progressively worsen until they succumb to the disease. There is no cure for the Knox Infection, and it is invariably fatal.

The game begins on July 9, 1993, approximately three days after the United States military establishes a blockade surrounding the infected areas of Muldraugh, Riverside, West Point, and Rosewood, dubbed the Knox Exclusion Zone. US Army general John McGrew, who oversees containment measures within the exclusion zone, issues a statement informing the public to remain calm, assuring that no fatalities have been reported.

On July 11, the World Health Organization grounds all non-essential international flights to prevent the global spread of the infection. Riots erupt in various American cities, and curfews are implemented in New York City and Miami following a series of deaths and injuries. The next day, a picture from West Point is leaked to the media showing a one-armed man covered in blood and standing among corpses, which fuels fear and panic surrounding the situation. On July 13, media interviews with survivors who had been released from military captivity within the exclusion zone reveal the nature of the infected to "hunt" the living, spreading the infection through bites.

McGrew issues a statement on July 14 assuring that "America is safe" while elaborating on details of the Knox Event, confirming that the infection is spread through direct fluid contact, scratches, and other "un-American" acts of violence. Increased chaos within the exclusion zone eventually leads to a breach of the military blockade, resulting in the complete withdrawal of the military. Around this time, Louisville becomes infected (though the player can visit Louisville prior to the breach and find it infected). By July 15, the first reports of individuals falling ill to the Knox Infection without being bitten are confirmed by the media. As the exclusion zone expands, the airborne transmission of the virus becomes apparent. On July 16, in a desperate attempt to contain the spread, the US military demolishes bridges over the Ohio River, killing hundreds of escaping civilians and trapping both survivors and zombies in Knox Country.

On July 17, the virus is confirmed in Cincinnati, Mogadishu, Seoul, Okinawa, and multiple cities in England. In a final broadcast, McGrew addresses the individuals unaffected by the second wave of the Knox Event, urging them to take extreme measures for their survival. He confirms that while these immune individuals cannot contract the disease naturally, they remain susceptible to infection through fluid contact, specifically citing bites. McGrew commands these survivors to defend themselves, stressing the importance of their survival for the continuation of humanity. The general ends his message assuring the survivors they haven't been forgotten and promising rescue and support. Subsequently, most radio and television stations cease operations by July 18, marking the end of the world.

== Development ==
Project Zomboid major release timeline Pre-release years in red
2011	0.0.0
2011	Pre-Alpha
2012	0.2.0
2012	Experimental Combat Build
2013	Build 1
2013	Build 11: "Steam Release"
2013	Build 14
2013	Build 19
2013	Build 20
2013	Build 21
2013	Build 23
2014	Build 25 "Boxed Nails"
2014	Build 26: "Online MP & 3D Character Models"
2014	Build 27: "Trapping"
2014	Build 28: "Firearm Overhaul"
2014	Build 29: "Foraging"
2014	Build 30: "Erosion"
2015	Build 31 "Professions System"
2015	Build 32: "Spiffo's Workshop"
2016	Build 33 "3D FMOD Dynamic Sound"
2016	Build 34 "Higher Definition Textures"
2016	Build 35 "Rosewood & March Ridge"
2017	Build 36 "Trading"
2017	Build 37 "Map Annotations"
2017	Build 38: "The Pre-Vehicles Build"
2018	Build 39: "The Vehicles Build"
2018	Build 40: "The Weather Build"
2019
2020
2021	Build 41: "Animation Overhaul"
2022
2023
2024
2025
2026	Build 42: "Expanded Crafting and Balance"

According to developers at The Indie Stone, the game has been something they "always wanted to make" and a "dream game", although they felt that they would be unable to due to time commitments. This sentiment changed after the success of Minecraft, which showed them another way to develop a game that would produce a quicker result. The Indie Stone stated the main inspiration for the game were zombie movies as opposed to zombie video games. It is written in Java for its portability, using LWJGL.

The game was first released as an "Alpha Tech-Demo" on May 28, 2011. In June 2011, soon after the game's release as a paid pre-alpha tech demo, the game was leaked, and unauthorized copies spread to other websites. The unauthorized version of the game enabled downloading from the Project Zomboid servers with the press of an 'update now' button, regardless of whether the user already had the latest version. In order to avoid paying for these downloads, The Indie Stone took the customer-only paid version offline, and instead, released a free "public tech-demo" for download the next day.

On October 15, 2011, the apartment of two of the developers was broken into, and laptops containing large amounts of the game code, which had not been backed up externally, were stolen, resulting in severe delays to the game's development. Due to these setbacks, they gave a presentation at Rezzed entitled "How (not) to make a video game", going over some of the lessons they have learned since starting the project.

In November 2013, Project Zomboid was released via Steam Early Access. A multiplayer gamemode was added to the game in 2014 but was later removed, with The Indie Stone citing performance issues. The amount of concurrent players on Steam rose substantially with the full release of Build 41 on December 20, 2021, which added a retooled multiplayer, updated combat, and refined character customization and animation. On December 17, 2024, Build 42 of Project Zomboid entered open beta. On July 9, 2026, it was announced that Build 42 would be made the new stable build.
