= Edward Yeakel House =

- U.S. National Register of Historic Places
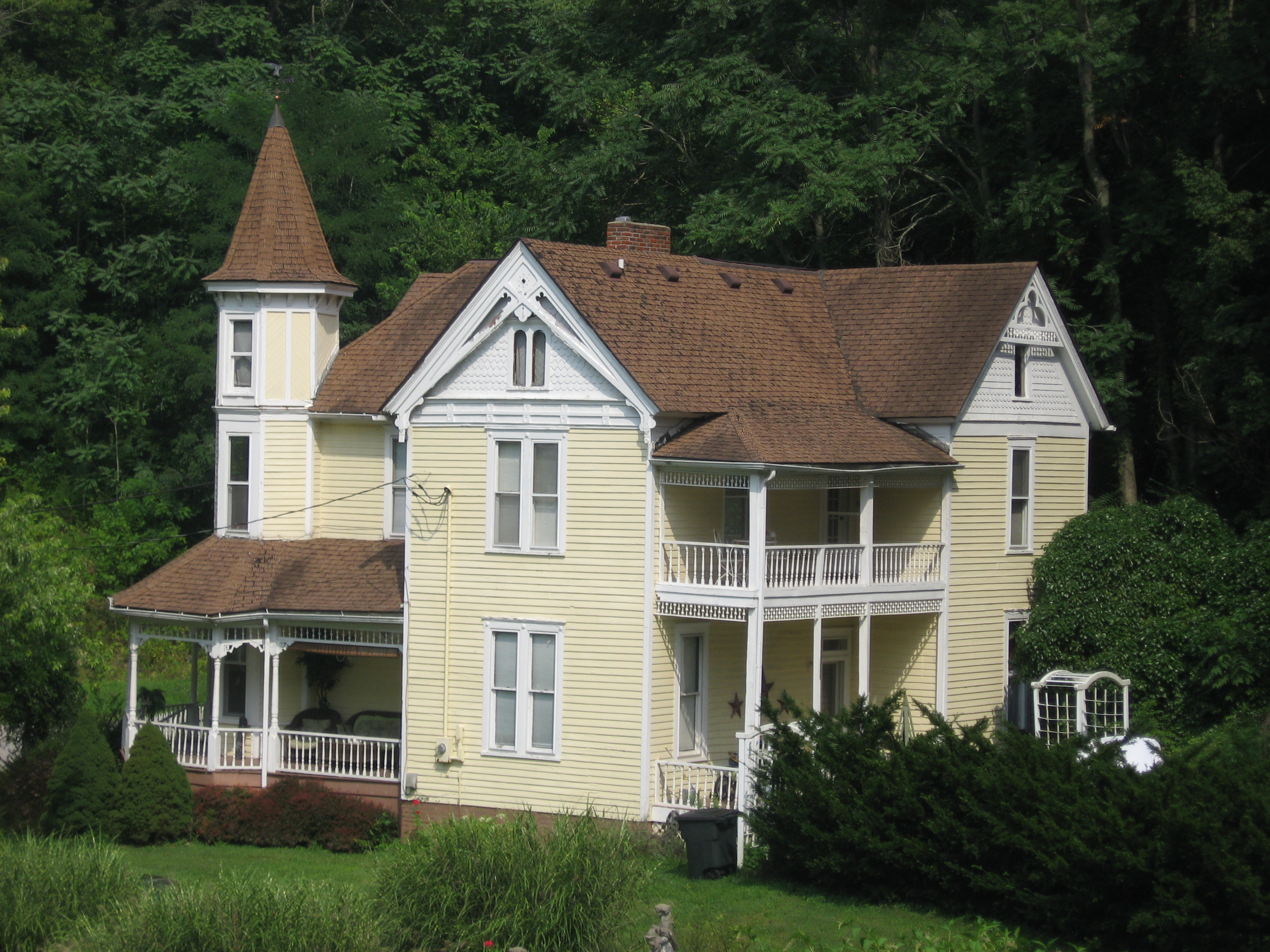

- Location within Kentucky
- Location: 116 Decatur St., Brandenburg, Kentucky
- Coordinates: 38°00′08″N 86°10′08″W
- Area: 0.5 acres (0.20 ha)
- Built: c.1885-90
- Architectural style: Queen Anne
- MPS: Brandenburg MRA
- NRHP reference No.: 84001839
- Added to NRHP: August 14, 1984

The Edward Yeakel House, at 116 Decatur St. in Brandenburg, Kentucky, was built around 1885 to 1890. It was listed on the National Register of Historic Places in 1984.

It is Queen Anne in style. It is two-and-a-half-stories tall, and has a three-story tower. It was built for Edward Yeakel, a merchant in Brandenburg. It was bought in 1920 by a Dr. Baxter, who used it for a medical office and as a residence. The property was deemed "architecturally significant as the outstanding example of the Queen Anne style in Brandenburg."

The listing included a second contributing building, which might be either a one-story root cellar built of limestone and brick, or a one-story frame carriage house.
