= Brandenburg Methodist Episcopal Church =

Historic church in Kentucky, United States

- Brandenburg Methodist Church
- U.S. National Register of Historic Places
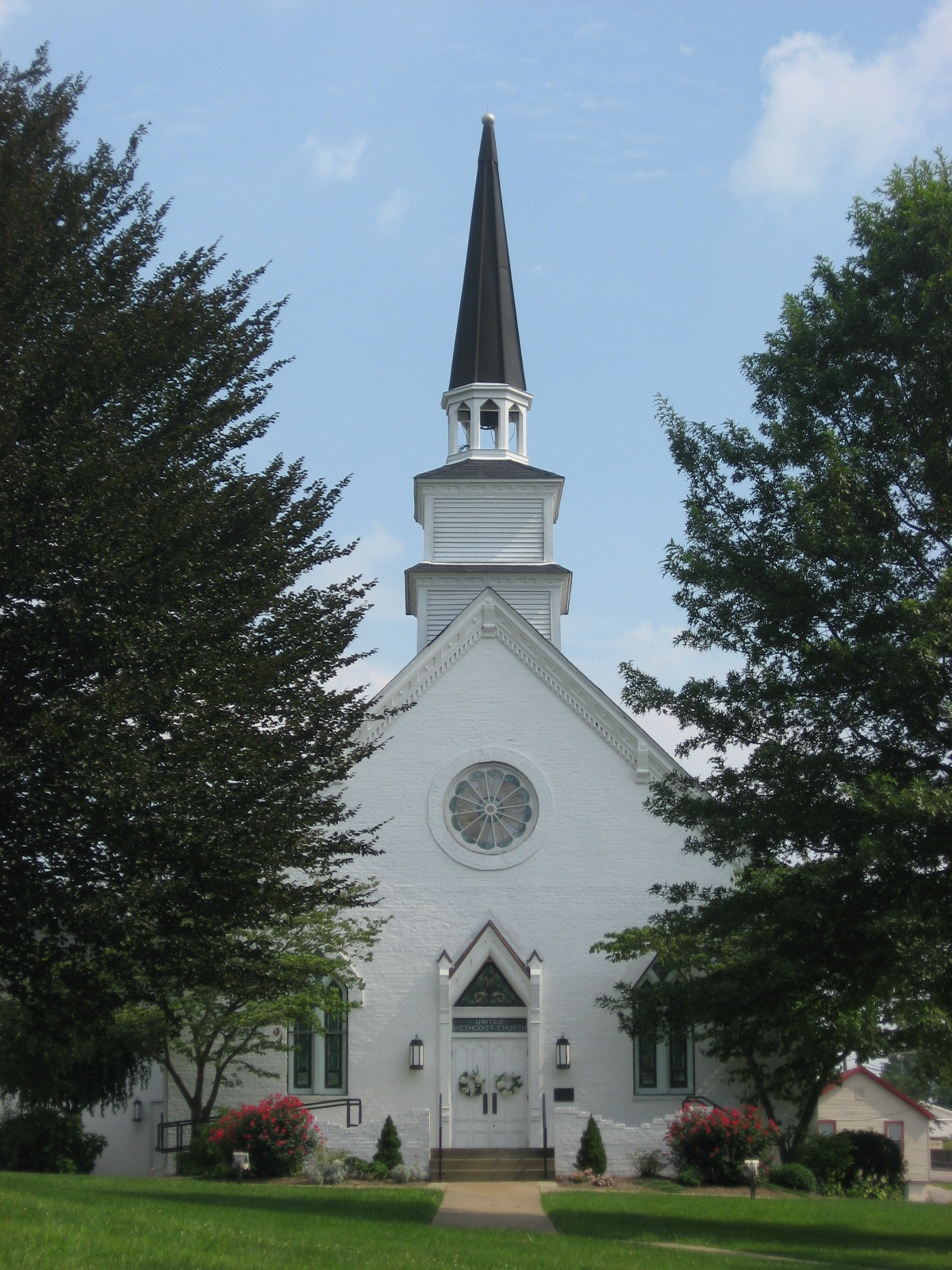

- Location within Kentucky Location within the United States
- Location: 215 Broadway, Brandenburg, Kentucky
- Coordinates: 37°59′59″N 86°10′9″W
- Area: 1 acre (0.40 ha)
- Built: 1855
- MPS: Brandenburg MRA
- NRHP reference No.: 84001828
- Added to NRHP: August 14, 1984

Brandenburg United Methodist Church (formerly Brandenburg United Methodist Episcopal Church) is a historic church at 215 Broadway in Brandenburg, Kentucky. It was built in 1855 and added to the National Register of Historic Places in 1984.

The church received a rear addition in 1893.
