= Midway, Meade County, Kentucky =

Unincorporated community in Kentucky, United States

Midway, Kentucky
- Unincorporated community
- Location within the state of Kentucky Midway (the United States)
- Coordinates: 37°57′07″N 86°14′19″W
- Country: United States
- State: Kentucky
- County: Meade
- Elevation: 640 ft (200 m)
- Time zone: UTC-5 (Eastern (EST))
  - Summer (DST): UTC-4 (EST)
- GNIS feature ID: 498163

Midway is an unincorporated community in Meade County, Kentucky, United States.
