= Kosmosdale, Louisville =

Neighborhood in Louisville, Kentucky

Kosmosdale is a neighborhood in southwestern Louisville, Kentucky located along Dixie Highway (US 31W) near Depot Lane and is named after the Kosmos Cement Company. The Kosmos Cement Company was purchased by the Flintkote Corporation in 1957 and operated as a Division of Flintkote for many years. It is now operated by Eagle Materials Inc. after being purchased from CEMEX USA in 2020.

An F4 tornado formed in the southwest part of Jefferson County near this area on April 3, 1974, during the Super Outbreak. It took three lives, but injured two hundred and seven Louisville citizens. This storm derived from the same supercell that formed the F5 tornado in Brandenburg.

== Geography ==
Kosmosdale is located at 38°1′56″N 85°54′34″W.
