= Jones-Willis House =

- U.S. National Register of Historic Places
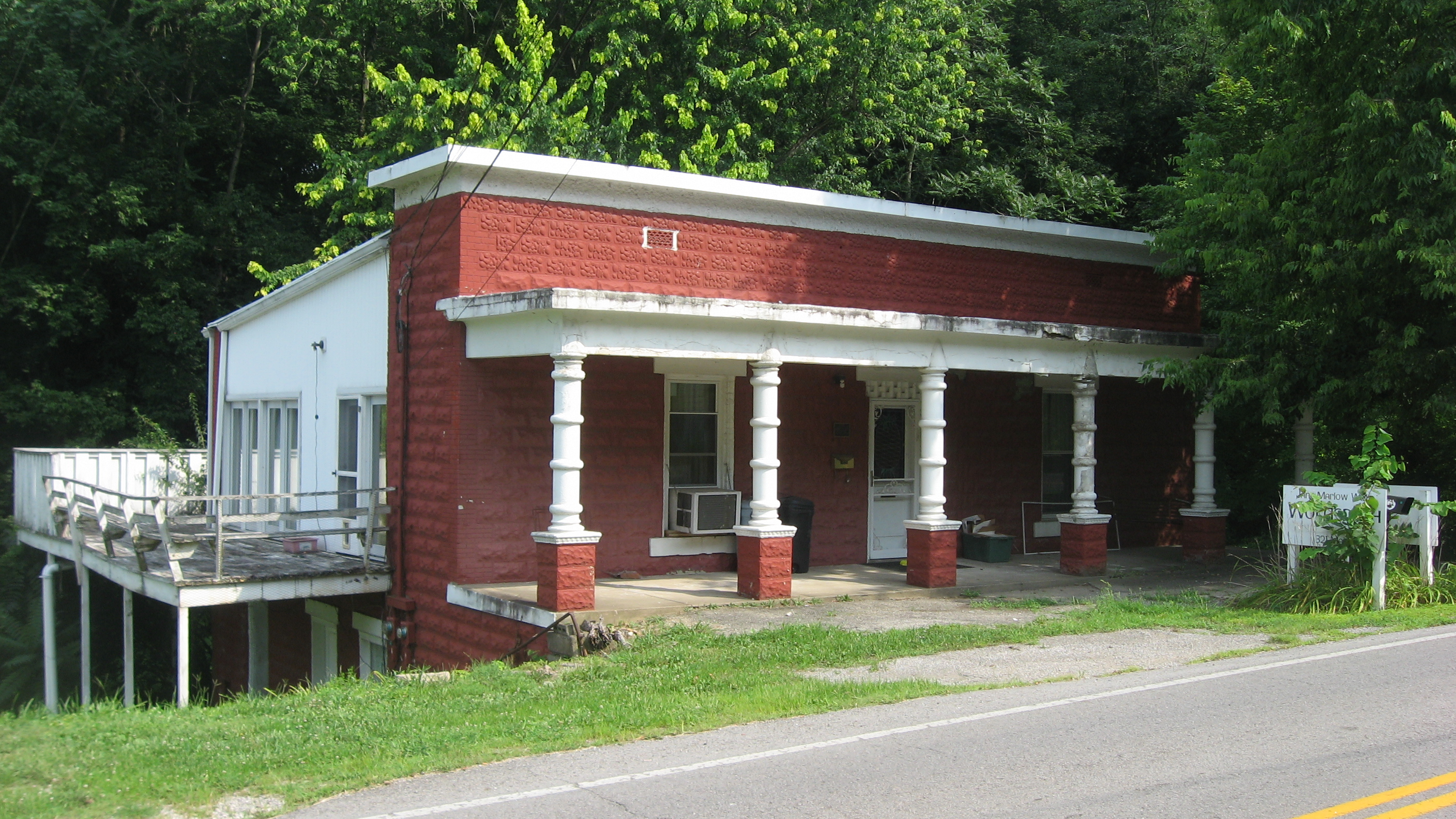

- Location within Kentucky Location within the United States
- Location: 321 Main St., Brandenburg, Kentucky
- Coordinates: 38°00′07″N 86°10′11″W
- Area: 0.5 acres (0.20 ha)
- Built: c.1920
- MPS: Brandenburg MRA
- NRHP reference No.: 84001835
- Added to NRHP: August 14, 1984

The Jones-Willis House, at 321 Main St. in Brandenburg, Kentucky, was built around 1920. It was listed on the National Register of Historic Places in 1984.

It is a concrete block house built by and for the Jones family who operated a concrete plant located next to the house. It was deemed "architecturally significant as the best representation of a concrete dwelling in Brandenburg. The dwelling exhibits qualities of excellent workmanship and design."
