= Willis House (Grand Encampment, Wyoming) =

- U.S. National Register of Historic Places
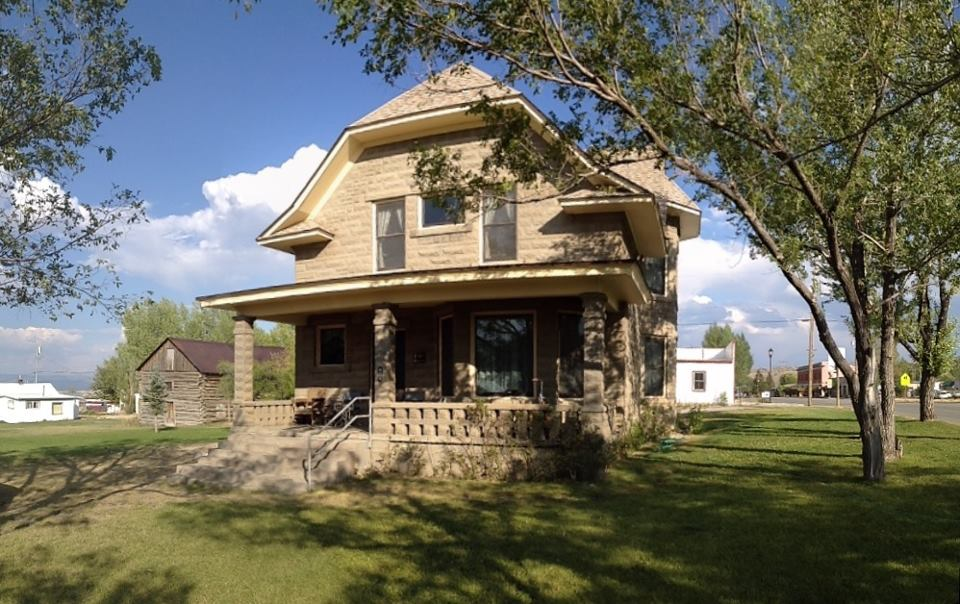
- The Willis House, August 2012

- Location within Wyoming Location within the United States
- Location: 621 Winchell Avenue; Encampment, Wyoming; United States
- Coordinates: 41°12′27″N 106°47′42″W
- Area: 0.4 acres (0.16 ha)
- Built: 1908
- Architect: Ball, Harry
- Architectural style: Late 19th And Early 20th Century American Movements
- NRHP reference No.: 01000300
- Added to NRHP: March 29, 2001

The Willis House is a historic residence in Encampment, Wyoming, United States, that is listed on the National Register of Historic Places.

== Description ==
The house was built in 1908 for Mrs. Lydia M. Willis in Encampment, Wyoming as a house of prostitution and the headquarters for her family's business network. Mrs. Willis had previously operated a similar business in Encampment in a house next to her husband's saloon. The Willises managed a number of similar operations, with two brothels in Rawlins, one each in Saratoga and Encampment, and probably one in Rock Springs. Mr. Willis bred race horses and managed saloons. The house is notable as one of the most prominent houses in Encampment and the only masonry house in town.

The Willis House is described as a modified American Foursquare of two stories, built in molded concrete block. The house is fronted by a masonry-pillared porch on the short west side, with a half-story elevation above with deep flared eaves and a clipped gable. The interior detailing is somewhat plain. The upper level was subdivided into five rooms suited for the planned use, three of which have bed alcoves. All share a single toilet. The property includes a log barn to the rear.

== History ==
Lydia M. Propst was born in about 1846 in Pendleton County, Virginia (now West Virginia). Following the death of her husband Edward after the American Civil War Lydia and her son Lee, another son and a daughter moved to Rawlins around 1886, where she married S.L. (Jerry) Willis. The Willises settled in Encampment, which was near the center of the Grand Encampment copper mining boom of the early 20th century, with a ready supply of miners seeking entertainment. The Willises traveled throughout Colorado and Wyoming, starting a number of businesses, many involving prostitution. Extensive correspondence has been preserved documenting Mrs. Willis's business and her relationship with her girls.

Despite their business activities, which occasioned editorial complaints in the town newspaper, Mr. Willis was Encampment Justice of the Peace in 1915 and Town Marshal in 1916. The end of the copper boom in Encampment apparently caused the house to remain largely unfinished within, and the Willises left Encampment sometime between 1916 and Lydia's 1926 death in Brighton, Colorado. Her son Lee operated a gas station in Encampment until his death in 1941. The house changed hands 18 times before 1931, until it was purchased by rancher, merchant and miner Charles Deo Terwilliger. Terwilliger had made his fortune in Nevada by selling supplies to miners. After some setbacks to his ranching business he and his wife Laura bought the Willis House for $800 in 1931, adapting the house as a boarding house for teachers. The house remained in the hands of Terwilliger's descendants into the 21st century.

The Willis House was placed on the National Register of Historic Places on March 29, 2001.

== See also ==
- National Register of Historic Places listings in Carbon County, Wyoming
