= Stillman Willis House =

Historic house in Massachusetts, United States

- U.S. National Register of Historic Places
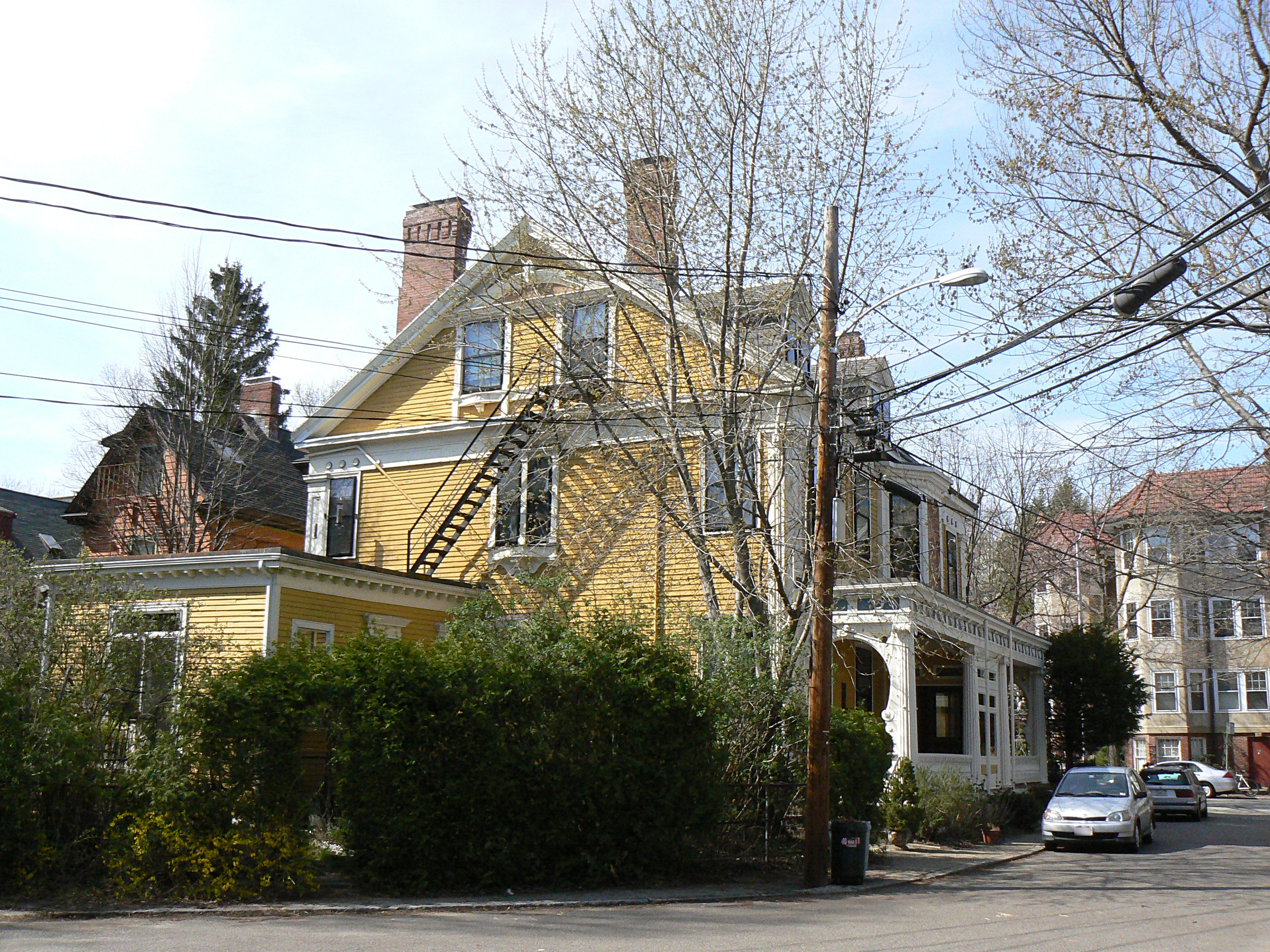

- Location within Massachusetts Location within the United States
- Location: 1 Potter Park, Cambridge, Massachusetts
- Coordinates: 42°23′4″N 71°7′15″W
- Built: 1839
- Architectural style: Colonial Revival, Greek Revival, Italianate
- MPS: Cambridge MRA
- NRHP reference No.: 82001985
- Added to NRHP: April 13, 1982

The Stillman Willis House is an historic house in Cambridge, Massachusetts. This 2 1/2-story house was built in 1839, and was originally located nearby on Massachusetts Avenue. It was moved to its present location in 1883, at which time it was extensively modernized, overlaying its Greek Revival features with Italianate and Colonial Revival styling. Surviving Greek Revival elements include corner pilasters and an entablature, while later features include bracketed window cornices and extensive decorative woodwork on the porches.

The house was listed on the National Register of Historic Places in 1982.

== See also ==
- National Register of Historic Places listings in Cambridge, Massachusetts
