= Doe Run Inn =

- Doe Run Mill
- U.S. National Register of Historic Places
- U.S. Historic district – Contributing property
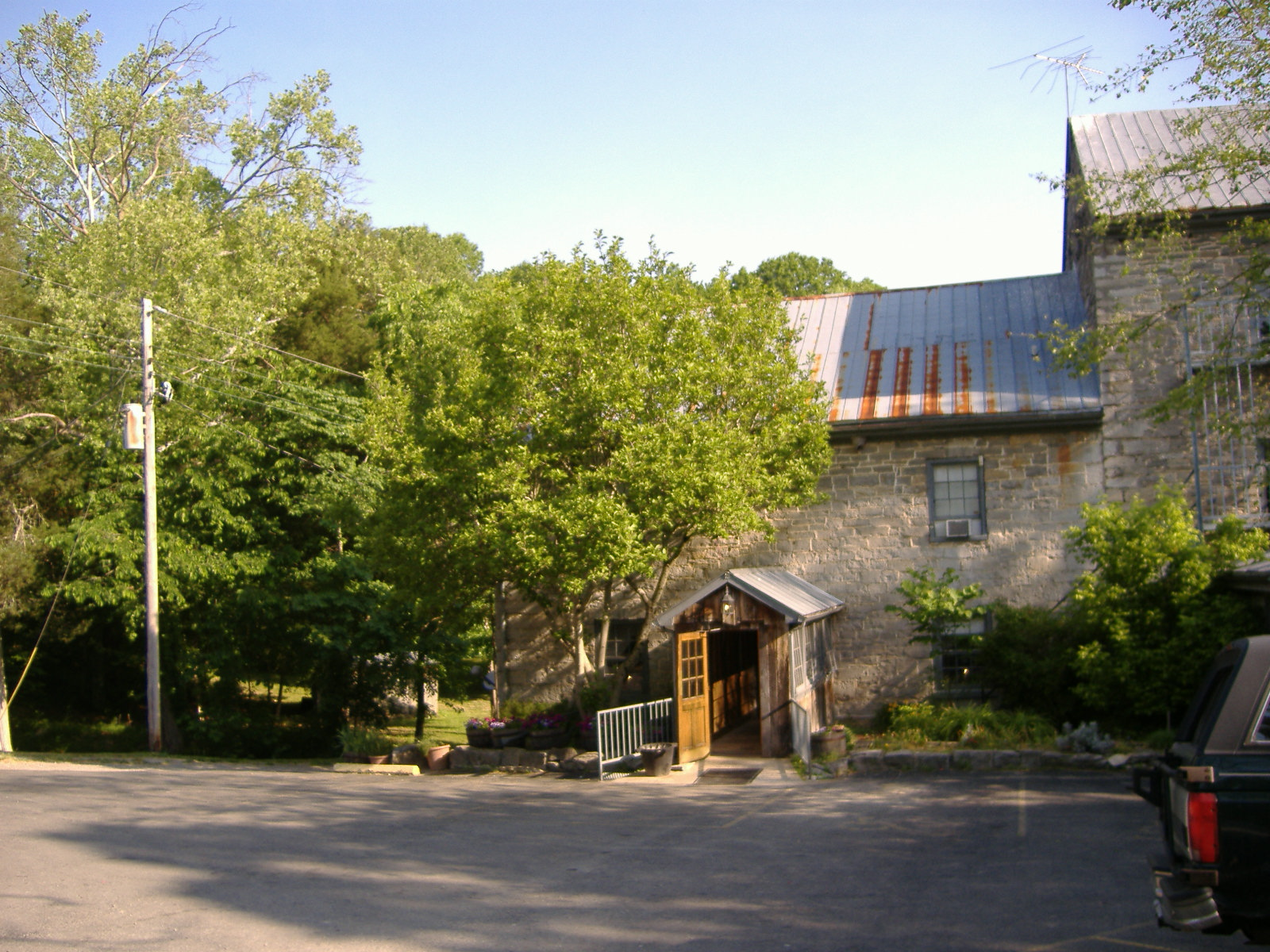
- The inn entrance in 2007.

- Location within Kentucky Location within the United States
- Location: Kentucky Route 1638 on Doe Run Creek, Brandenburg, Kentucky
- Nearest city: Brandenburg, Kentucky
- Coordinates: 37°57′35″N 86°07′19″W
- Built: 1792
- Architect: Thomas Stevenson
- Part of: Doe Run Creek Historic District (ID78001386)
- NRHP reference No.: 87002053

Significant dates
- Added to NRHP: October 6, 1987
- Designated CP: December 19, 1978

Doe Run Inn is a restaurant/inn business two miles southeast of Brandenburg, Kentucky. It is within the Doe Run Creek Historic District, which was placed on the National Register of Historic Places on December 19, 1978.

Squire Boone had discovered the creek, along with John McKinney, in 1778, and named it Doe Run Creek. It was so named due to the many deer in the vicinity. The creek had sulfur and salt licks, making it attractive for buffalo and elk.

The mill was built between 1788 and 1790 by Jonathan Essery, and was originally known as Stevenson's Mill. It was made of local limestone and timbers that were hand-hewn. The walls are two feet thick. Thomas Lincoln worked as a stonemason on the newer section of the mill, which was constructed in 1800.

Throughout its history as a mill, it was seldom profitable, due to so many competing mills. By 1900 it was being used as a barn. It became the Sulfur Wells Hotel in 1901 when W.D. Coleman purchased it. It attracted several tourists who sought the purported health benefits of the sulfur water. In 1947 the Haycrafts leased the Inn. It was renamed the Doe Run Inn in 1958 when it was leased by Curtis and Lucille Brown.

The district includes an additional mill and three houses, one of which was a log cabin. Also within the district was Meade County's first hydro-electric plant.

== Gallery ==
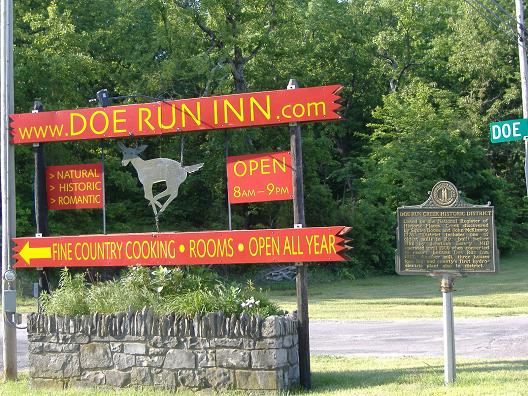
Entrance to the property off the state highway

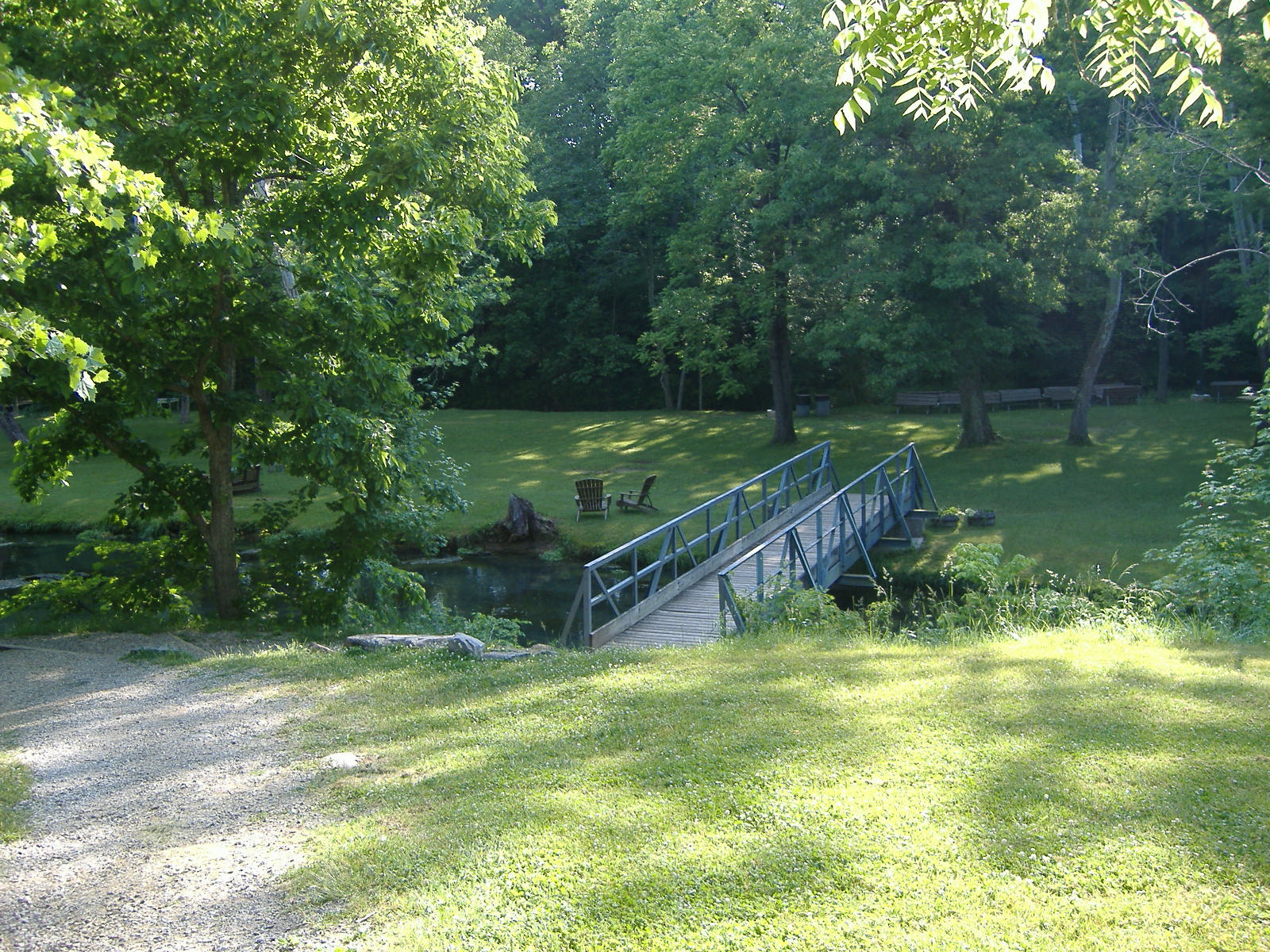
Bridge near the inn along creek

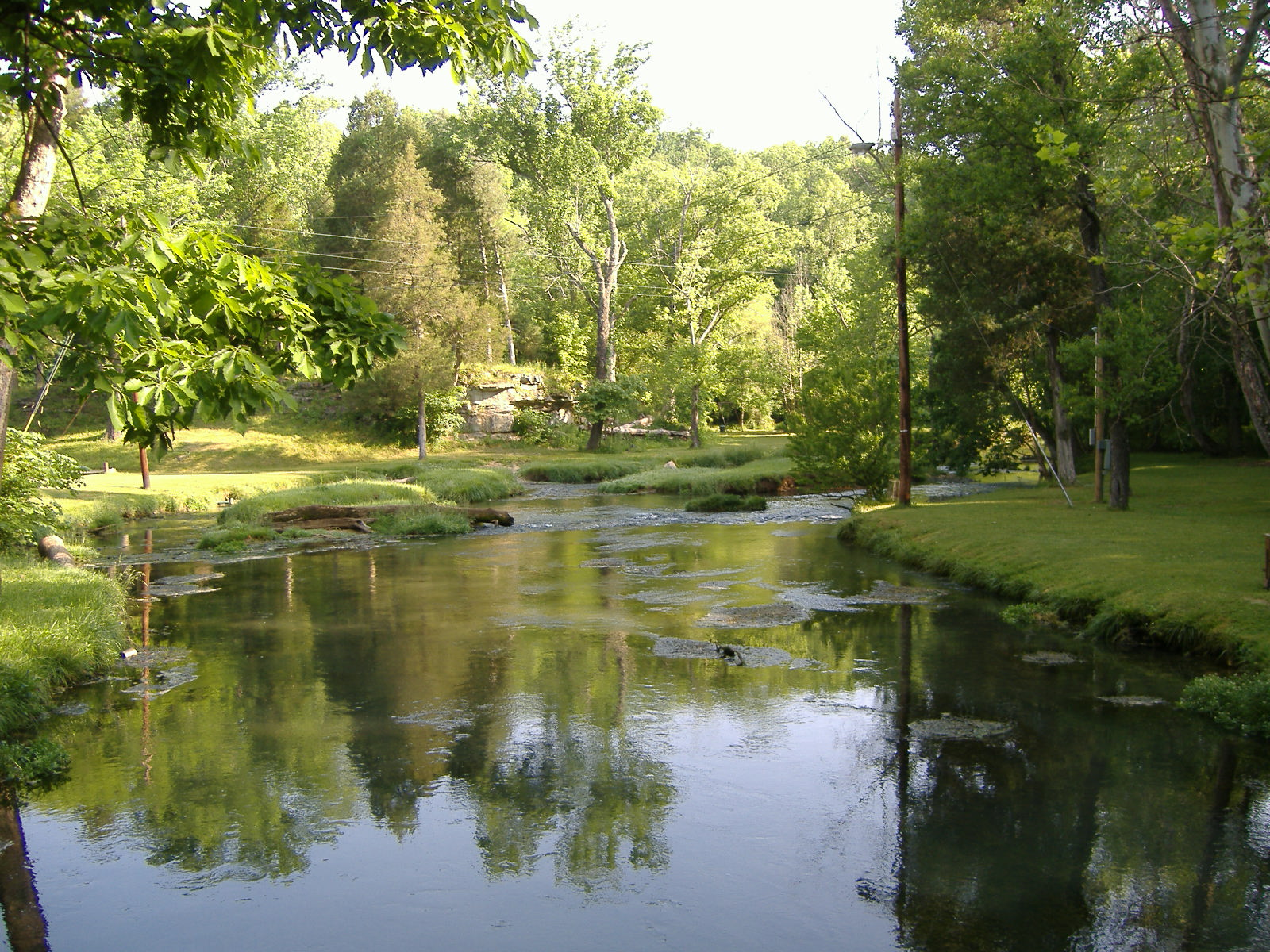
Doe Run Creek

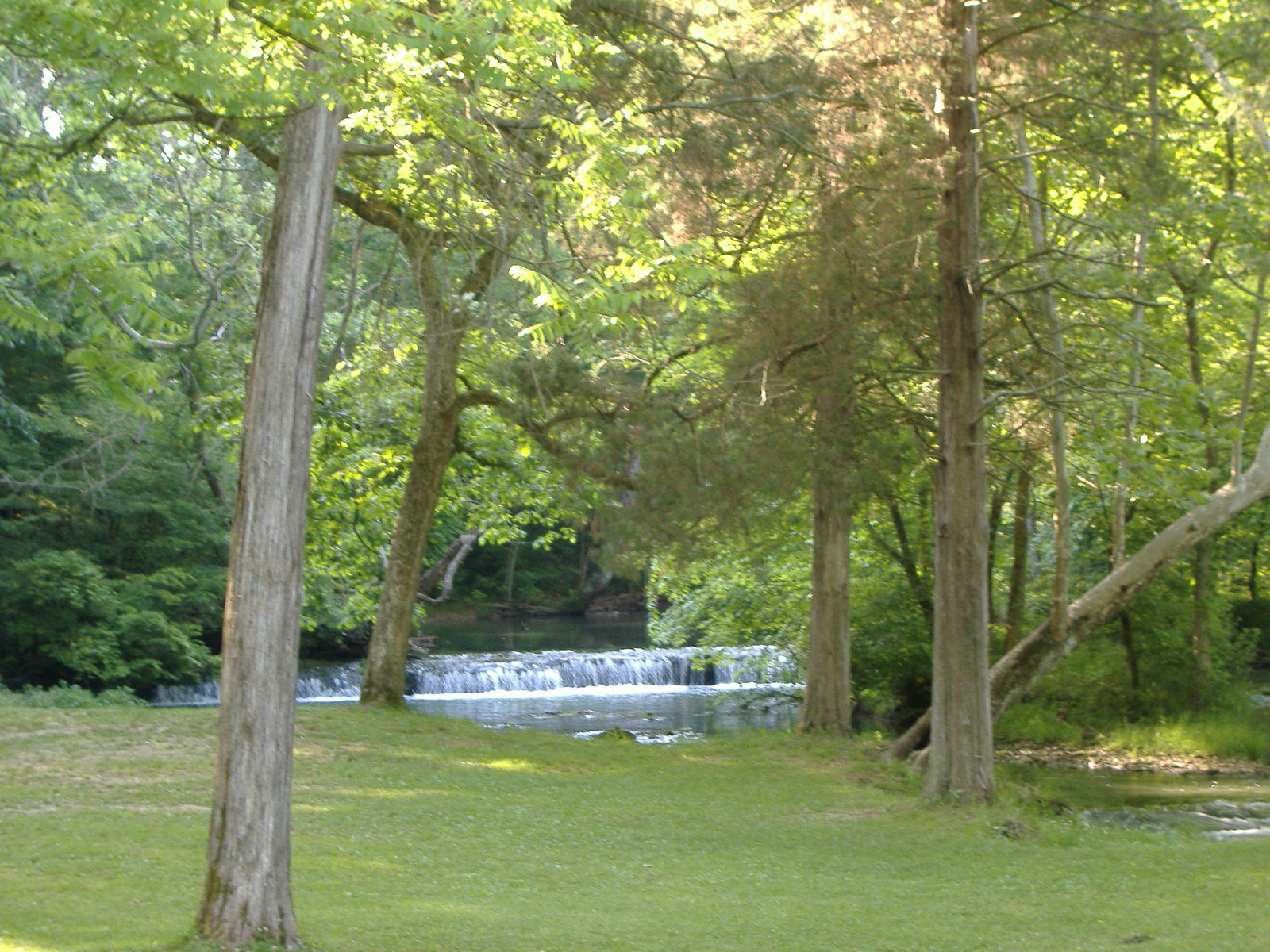
Waterfall along creek

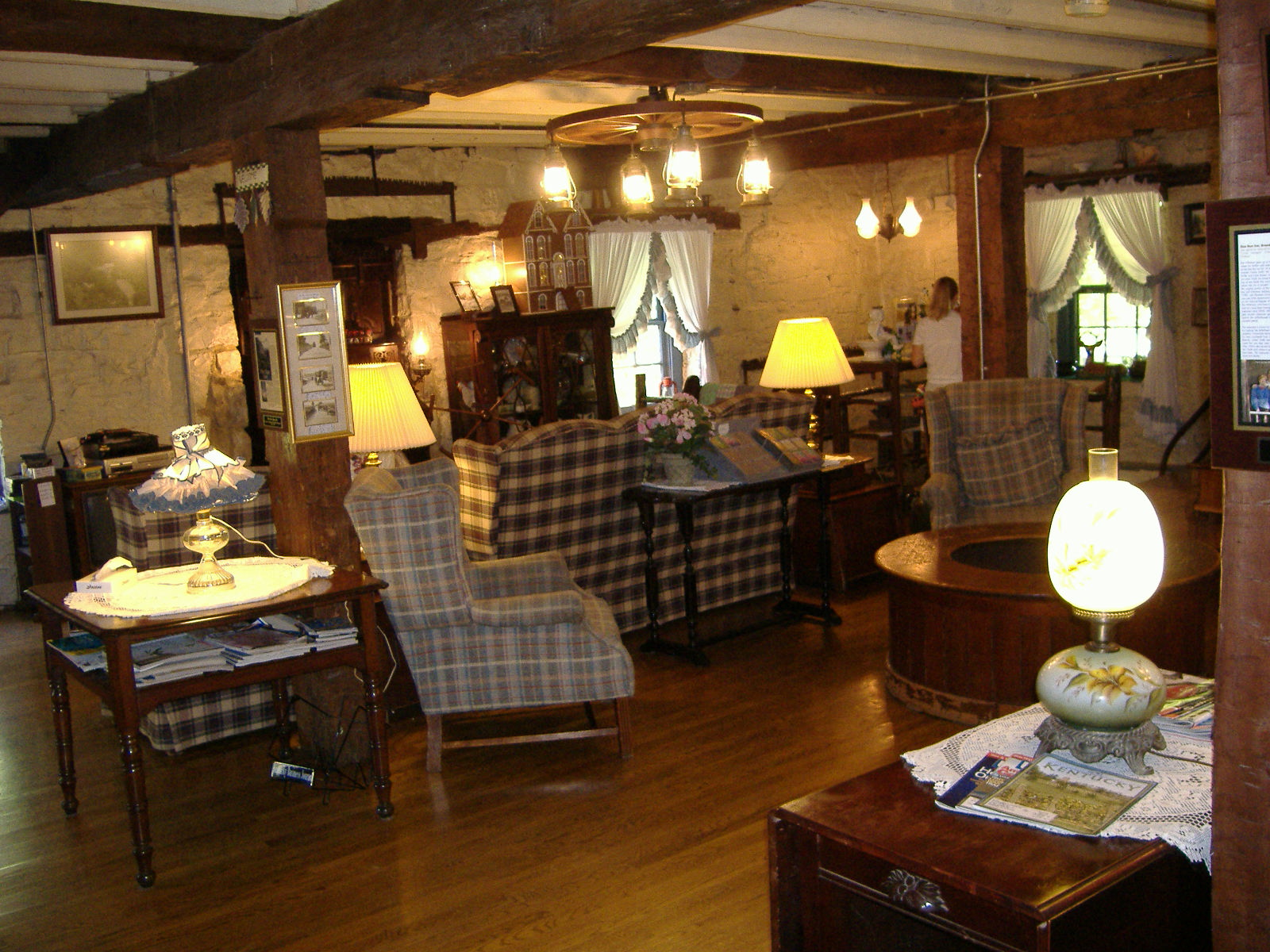
Interior of the inn
