= Lickskillet, Meade County, Kentucky =

Unincorporated community in Kentucky, United States

Lickskillet, Kentucky
- Unincorporated community
- Location within the state of Kentucky Lickskillet (the United States)
- Coordinates: 37°56′02″N 86°03′26″W
- Country: United States
- State: Kentucky
- County: Meade
- Elevation: 692 ft (211 m)
- Time zone: UTC-5 (Eastern (EST))
  - Summer (DST): UTC-4 (EST)
- GNIS feature ID: 508458

Lickskillet is an unincorporated community in Meade County, Kentucky, United States.
