= Meade County, Kentucky =

County in Kentucky, United States

- County
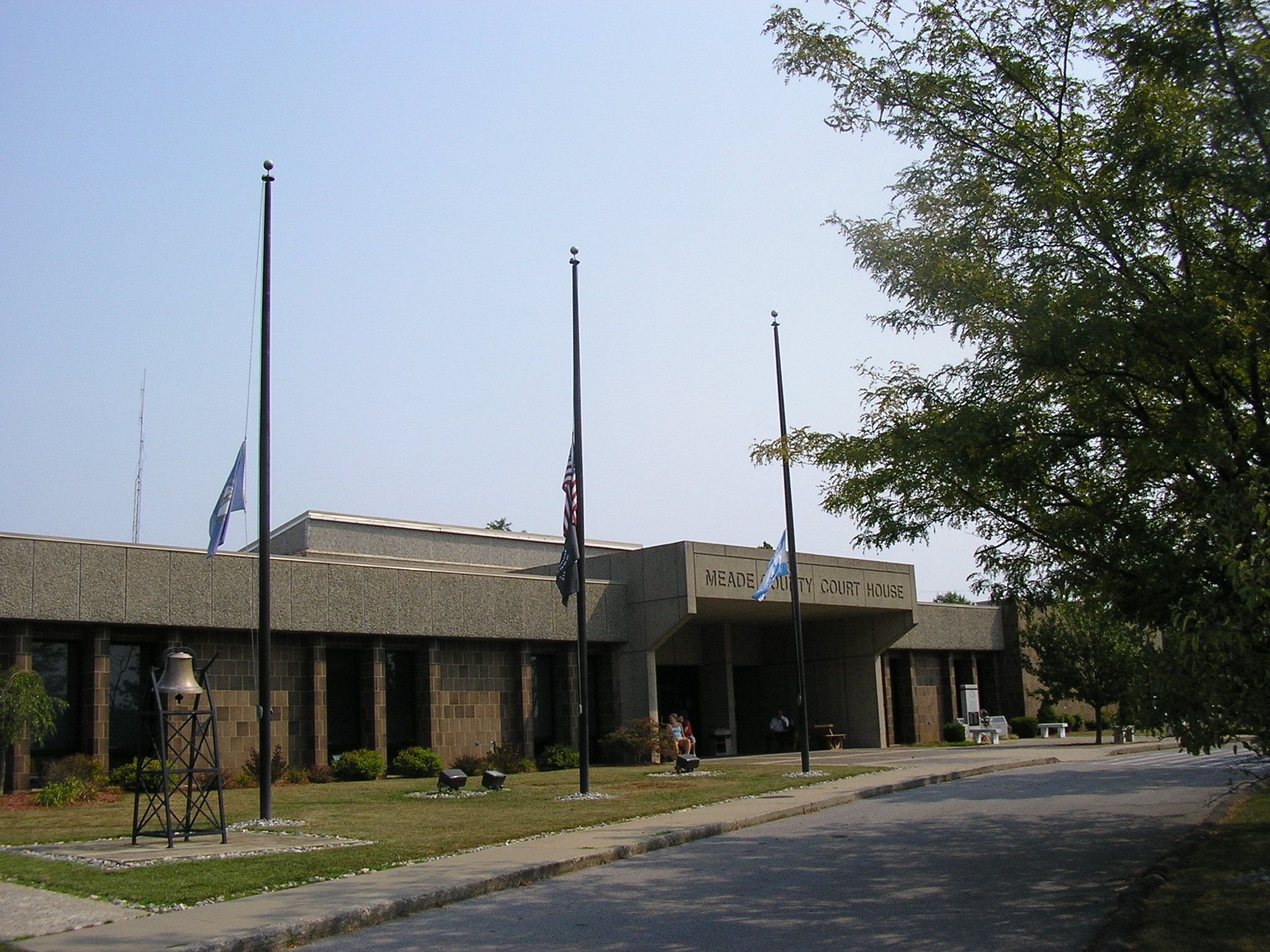
- Meade County courthouse in Brandenburg

- Flag Seal

- Location within the U.S. state of Kentucky
- Coordinates: 37°59′N 86°13′W
- Country: United States
- State: Kentucky
- Founded: 1823
- Named for: James Meade
- Seat: Brandenburg
- Largest city: Brandenburg

Government
  - Judge/Executive: Troy Kok (R)

Area
  - Total: 325 sq mi (840 km^{2})
  - Land: 305 sq mi (790 km^{2})
  - Water: 19 sq mi (49 km^{2}) 5.9%

Population (2020)
  - Total: 30,003
  - Estimate (2025): 30,699 ▲
  - Density: 98.4/sq mi (38.0/km^{2})
- Time zone: UTC−5 (Eastern)
  - Summer (DST): UTC−4 (EDT)
- Congressional district: 2nd
- Website: meadeky.gov

Meade County is a county located in the U.S. state of Kentucky. As of the 2020 census, the population was 30,003. Its county seat is Brandenburg. The county was founded December 17, 1823, and named for Captain James M. Meade, who was killed in action at the Battle of River Raisin during the War of 1812. Meade County is part of the Louisville metropolitan area.

Meade County residents have easy access to major job centers such as Elizabethtown and Fort Knox.

== Geography ==
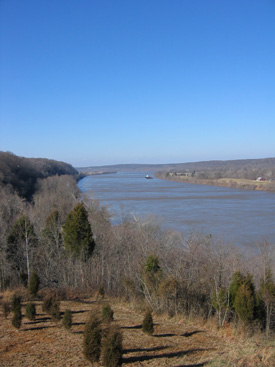
View of the Ohio River in Meade County

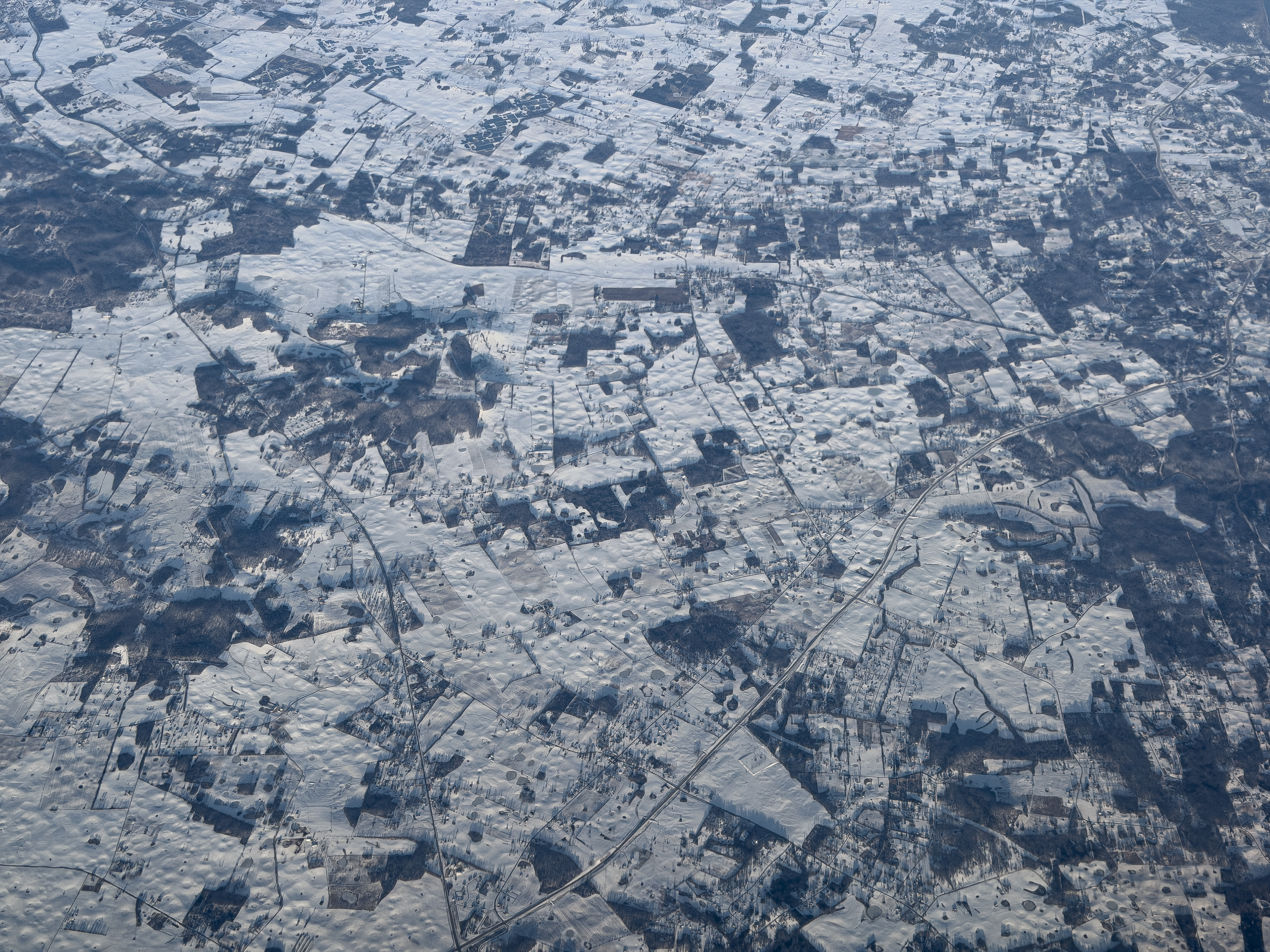
Sinkholes visible on the landscape near Hog Wallow, facing west towards Ekron

According to the United States Census Bureau, the county has a total area of 325 square miles (840 km^{2}), of which 305 square miles (790 km^{2}) is land and 19 square miles (49 km^{2}) (5.9%) is water. All 56 miles (90 km) of the county's northern border faces Indiana, across from the Ohio River.

Much of the county has the presence of sinkholes as the area's topography is primarily karst plains with occasional hills and elevations rising above. Northwest Meade County is mainly situated on a plateau, separated from karst plains by the Dripping Springs Escarpment, an easterly-facing cuesta.

=== Outdoor attractions ===
- Doe Run Inn
- Otter Creek Outdoor Recreation Area
- Meade Olin Park
- Diana’s Park
- Park Down By The River

=== Adjacent counties ===
- Hardin County
  (southeast & Fort Knox)
- Breckinridge County (southwest/CST Border)
- Harrison County, Indiana (northeast)
- Perry County, Indiana (northwest/CST Border)
- Crawford County, Indiana (north)

== Demographics ==
Historical population
Census	Pop.	Note	%±
1830	4,131		—
1840	5,780		39.9%
1850	7,393		27.9%
1860	8,898		20.4%
1870	9,485		6.6%
1880	10,323		8.8%
1890	9,484		−8.1%
1900	10,533		11.1%
1910	9,783		−7.1%
1920	9,442		−3.5%
1930	8,042		−14.8%
1940	8,827		9.8%
1950	9,422		6.7%
1960	18,938		101.0%
1970	18,796		−0.7%
1980	22,854		21.6%
1990	24,170		5.8%
2000	26,349		9.0%
2010	28,602		8.6%
2020	30,003		4.9%
2025 (est.)	30,699	▲	2.3%
U.S. Decennial Census; 1790–1960 1900–1990; 1990–2000 2010–2020

=== 2020 census ===
As of the 2020 census, the county had a population of 30,003. The median age was 38.4 years. 25.5% of residents were under the age of 18 and 14.2% of residents were 65 years of age or older. For every 100 females there were 100.0 males, and for every 100 females age 18 and over there were 98.5 males age 18 and over.

The racial makeup of the county was 87.7% White, 3.3% Black or African American, 0.5% American Indian and Alaska Native, 0.7% Asian, 0.2% Native Hawaiian and Pacific Islander, 1.1% from some other race, and 6.4% from two or more races. Hispanic or Latino residents of any race comprised 3.8% of the population.

9.4% of residents lived in urban areas, while 90.6% lived in rural areas.

There were 11,045 households in the county, of which 36.6% had children under the age of 18 living with them and 21.1% had a female householder with no spouse or partner present. About 20.8% of all households were made up of individuals and 8.9% had someone living alone who was 65 years of age or older.

There were 11,943 housing units, of which 7.5% were vacant. Among occupied housing units, 72.8% were owner-occupied and 27.2% were renter-occupied. The homeowner vacancy rate was 1.4% and the rental vacancy rate was 7.8%.

=== 2000 census ===
As of the census of 2000, there were 26,349 people, 9,470 households, and 7,396 families residing in the county. The population density was 85 per square mile (33/km^{2}). There were 10,293 housing units at an average density of 33 per square mile (13/km^{2}). The racial makeup of the county was 92.37% White, 4.13% Black or African American, 0.59% Native American, 0.53% Asian, 0.13% Pacific Islander, 0.83% from other races, and 1.43% from two or more races. 2.15% of the population were Hispanic or Latino of any race.

There were 9,470 households, out of which 42.20% had children under the age of 18 living with them, 64.10% were married couples living together, 9.70% had a female householder with no husband present, and 21.90% were non-families. Of all households 18.40% were made up of individuals, and 6.50% had someone living alone who was 65 years of age or older. The average household size was 2.77 and the average family size was 3.15.

In the county, the population was spread out, with 29.80% under the age of 18, 9.10% from 18 to 24, 32.70% from 25 to 44, 20.30% from 45 to 64, and 8.10% who were 65 years of age or older. The median age was 32 years. For every 100 females, there were 100.40 males. For every 100 females age 18 and over, there were 98.30 males.

The median income for a household in the county was $36,966, and the median income for a family was $40,592. Males had a median income of $30,835 versus $22,038 for females. The per capita income for the county was $16,000. About 9.30% of families and 11.30% of the population were below the poverty line, including 13.80% of those under age 18 and 12.30% of those age 65 or over.

== Communities ==
=== Cities ===
- Brandenburg (county seat)
- Ekron
- Muldraugh (partly in Hardin County)

=== Census-designated places ===
- Doe Valley
- Fort Knox, a military base (partly in Hardin County)

=== Other unincorporated places ===
- Battletown
- Big Spring (partly in Breckinridge County in the Central Time Zone and Hardin County in the Eastern Time Zone)
- Buck Grove
- Concordia
- Flaherty
- Garnettsville
- Garrett
- Guston
- Hog Wallow
- Lickskillet
- Midway
- Payneville
- Rhodelia
- Rock Haven
- Wolf Creek

== Politics ==
United States presidential election results for Meade County, Kentucky
Year	Republican		Democratic		Third party(ies)	
Year	No.	%	No.	%	No.	%
1912	337	16.58%	1,145	56.35%	550	27.07%
1916	803	37.11%	1,317	60.86%	44	2.03%
1920	1,468	39.75%	2,195	59.44%	30	0.81%
1924	1,106	37.43%	1,802	60.98%	47	1.59%
1928	1,610	48.54%	1,700	51.25%	7	0.21%
1932	1,050	29.46%	2,488	69.81%	26	0.73%
1936	785	26.47%	2,102	70.87%	79	2.66%
1940	995	31.88%	2,114	67.73%	12	0.38%
1944	1,040	36.11%	1,828	63.47%	12	0.42%
1948	773	27.99%	1,915	69.33%	74	2.68%
1952	1,265	38.22%	2,040	61.63%	5	0.15%
1956	1,670	45.23%	2,016	54.60%	6	0.16%
1960	1,826	43.36%	2,385	56.64%	0	0.00%
1964	1,055	25.51%	3,076	74.37%	5	0.12%
1968	1,385	32.98%	1,926	45.86%	889	21.17%
1972	2,492	60.93%	1,541	37.68%	57	1.39%
1976	1,755	36.05%	3,030	62.24%	83	1.71%
1980	2,740	45.22%	3,205	52.90%	114	1.88%
1984	3,820	60.19%	2,503	39.44%	24	0.38%
1988	3,441	52.57%	3,079	47.04%	25	0.38%
1992	2,641	35.86%	3,387	45.99%	1,337	18.15%
1996	2,855	38.33%	3,653	49.04%	941	12.63%
2000	5,319	58.64%	3,596	39.64%	156	1.72%
2004	7,152	65.31%	3,724	34.01%	75	0.68%
2008	6,691	59.71%	4,343	38.76%	172	1.53%
2012	6,606	60.52%	4,122	37.76%	188	1.72%
2016	8,660	70.80%	3,026	24.74%	545	4.46%
2020	10,185	72.17%	3,632	25.74%	296	2.10%
2024	10,630	75.27%	3,279	23.22%	214	1.52%

=== Elected officials ===
Elected officials as of January 3, 2025
U.S. House	Brett Guthrie (R)	KY 2
Ky. Senate	Stephen Meredith (R)	5
Ky. House	Nancy Tate (R)	27

== Education ==
Most of the county is zoned to Meade County Schools, which operates Meade County High School.

However people living on Fort Knox are instead zoned to the Department of Defense Education Activity (DoDEA), which operates Fort Knox Middle High School.

== See also ==
- National Register of Historic Places listings in Meade County, Kentucky
