= Rock Haven, Kentucky =

Unincorporated community in Kentucky, United States

Coordinates: 37°56′49″N 86°03′17″W

Rock Haven is an unincorporated community in Meade County, in the U.S. state of Kentucky.

== History ==
A post office called Rock Haven was established in 1848, and remained in operation until 1956. The community most likely was named for nearby rock outcroppings.

Rock Haven circa 1948 is described as a town of forty people with a falling population in Harlan Hubbard's Shantyboat, A River Way of Life (1977).
