= Clarkson House (Flaherty, Kentucky) =

Historic house in Kentucky, United States

- U.S. National Register of Historic Places
- Location within Kentucky Location within the United States
- Nearest city: Flaherty, Kentucky
- Coordinates: 37°48′48″N 86°6′20″W
- Built: 1832
- Architectural style: Federal
- NRHP reference No.: 83002825
- Added to NRHP: May 24, 1983

Clarkson House is a Federal-style house in Flaherty, Kentucky, United States that is believed to have been built in 1832. It was listed on the National Register of Historic Places in 1983.

The two-story building has a hall and parlor plan, and the interior features Federal influence in its woodwork and mantels. An 1890 tornado caused damage to the foundation; being left unrepaired, the damage had led to sagging by the 1980s.
