= Muldraugh, Kentucky =

- City
- Nickname: "The Gateway to Gold"
- Location in Hardin County, Kentucky
- Coordinates: 37°56′13″N 85°59′29″W
- Country: United States
- State: Kentucky
- Counties: Meade, Hardin
- Incorporated: 1852

Area
  - Total: 0.53 sq mi (1.36 km^{2})
  - Land: 0.52 sq mi (1.35 km^{2})
  - Water: 0 sq mi (0.00 km^{2})
- Elevation: 738 ft (225 m)

Population (2020)
  - Total: 1,040
  - Density: 1,989.8/sq mi (768.25/km^{2})
- Time zone: UTC-5 (Eastern (EST))
  - Summer (DST): UTC-4 (EDT)
- ZIP code: 40155
- Area code: 502
- FIPS code: 21-54480
- GNIS feature ID: 0499075
- Website: muldraugh.ky.gov

Muldraugh is a home rule-class city in Meade and Hardin counties in the U.S. state of Kentucky. It lies on U.S. Route 31W north of Elizabethtown. The city limits are completely encompassed by the Fort Knox army base. The population was 1,040 as of the 2020 census. The city is part of the Elizabethtown–Fort Knox Metropolitan Area.

== Geography ==
Muldraugh is in eastern Meade County, with a small portion at the south end extending east into Hardin County. U.S. Routes 31W and 60 form the western border of the city. The highway leads north 27 miles (43 km) to Louisville. US 31W leads south 18 miles (29 km) to Elizabethtown, while US 60 turns west just south of the Muldraugh city limits and leads 34 miles (55 km) to Hardinsburg. Brandenburg Station Road, the north entrance to Fort Knox, has an interchange with US 31W and 60 at the south end of Muldraugh.

According to the United States Census Bureau, the city has a total area of 0.52 square miles (1.35 km^{2}), all land.

Muldraugh is located just south of Muldraugh Hill at 37°56′13″N 85°59′29″W (37.936975, -85.991414). The road coming to the town from the north (now U.S. 31W and U.S. 60) is very steep, which is the source of the town's name: early on, reaching the area required a "mule-drawn" wagon.

== Demographics ==
Historical population
Census	Pop.	Note	%±
1960	1,743		—
1970	1,773		1.7%
1980	1,752		−1.2%
1990	1,376		−21.5%
2000	1,298		−5.7%
2010	947		−27.0%
2020	1,040		9.8%
U.S. Decennial Census

As of the census of 2000, there were 1,298 people, 519 households, and 319 families residing in the city. The population density was 2,264.6 inhabitants per square mile (874.4/km^{2}). There were 635 housing units at an average density of 1,107.9 per square mile (427.8/km^{2}). The racial makeup of the city was 82.36% White, 9.94% African American, 1.39% Native American, 1.00% Asian, 0.08% Pacific Islander, 2.16% from other races, and 3.08% from two or more races. Hispanics or Latinos of any race were 7.01% of the population.

There were 519 households, out of which 34.7% had children under the age of 18 living with them, 38.2% were married couples living together, 17.0% had a female householder with no husband present, and 38.5% were non-families. 30.8% of all households were made up of individuals, and 6.0% had someone living alone who was 65 years of age or older. The average household size was 2.50 and the average family size was 3.12.

The age distribution was 28.2% under the age of 18, 13.6% from 18 to 24, 34.7% from 25 to 44, 16.4% from 45 to 64, and 7.1% who were 65 years of age or older. The median age was 29 years. For every 100 females, there were 104.4 males. For every 100 females age 18 and over, there were 107.6 males.

The median income for a household in the city was $29,712, and the median income for a family was $31,625. Males had a median income of $27,955 versus $20,450 for females. The per capita income for the city was $13,318. About 19.5% of families and 20.7% of the population were below the poverty line, including 27.6% of those under age 18 and 23.9% of those age 65 or over.

== In popular culture ==
In the 1964 James Bond movie Goldfinger, a section of Main Street appears in the film. In the scene where Goldfinger's men are driving in Army trucks on their way to Fort Knox, they can be seen coming out of Harris Street turning onto Main Street. The red brick house on Harris Street, the white cinder block building on the corner of Harris and Main, and the Used Cars sign in the background are still there today.

Muldraugh and its neighboring town West Point both serve as starting towns in the 2013 early-access open world zombie survival horror videogame Project Zomboid. While in-game, the player can explore and loot a close representation of the towns that include both existing and fictional landmarks and locations. It is possible to leave these towns and follow the highway north, where one will end upon the city of Louisville, the most extensive and populated settlement within the video game and the Commonwealth of Kentucky.
