= Brandenburg, Kentucky =

- City
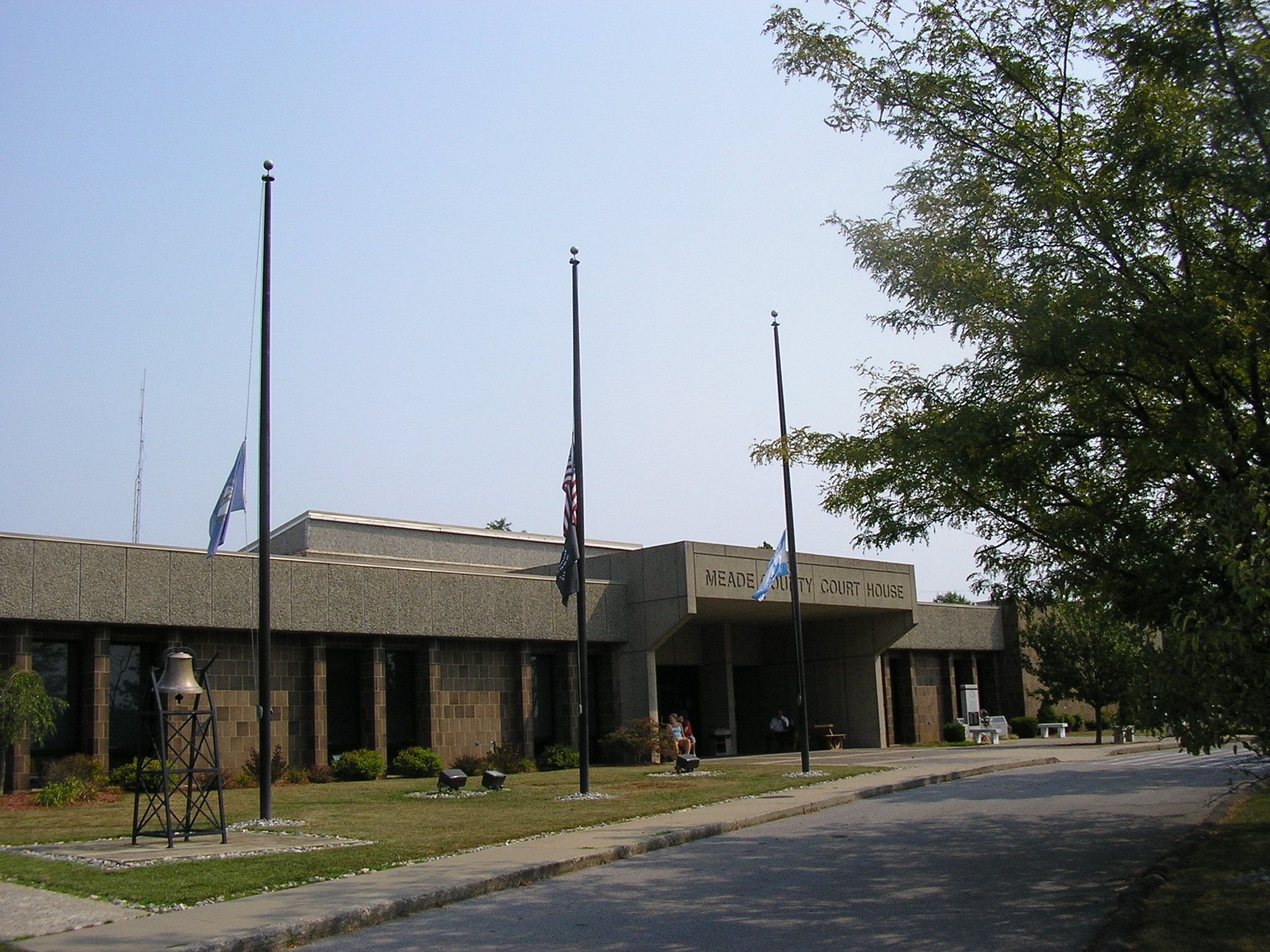
- Meade County courthouse in Brandenburg

- Location in Meade County, Kentucky
- Coordinates: 37°59′34″N 86°10′29″W
- Country: United States
- State: Kentucky
- County: Meade

Area
  - Total: 4.11 sq mi (10.65 km^{2})
  - Land: 4.10 sq mi (10.61 km^{2})
  - Water: 0.019 sq mi (0.05 km^{2})
- Elevation: 568 ft (173 m)

Population (2020)
  - Total: 2,894
  - Estimate (2024): 2,974
  - Density: 706.7/sq mi (272.84/km^{2})
- Time zone: UTC-5 (Eastern (EST))
  - Summer (DST): UTC-4 (EDT)
- ZIP code: 40108
- Area codes: 270 & 364
- FIPS code: 21-09226
- GNIS feature ID: 0487822
- Website: brandenburg.ky.gov

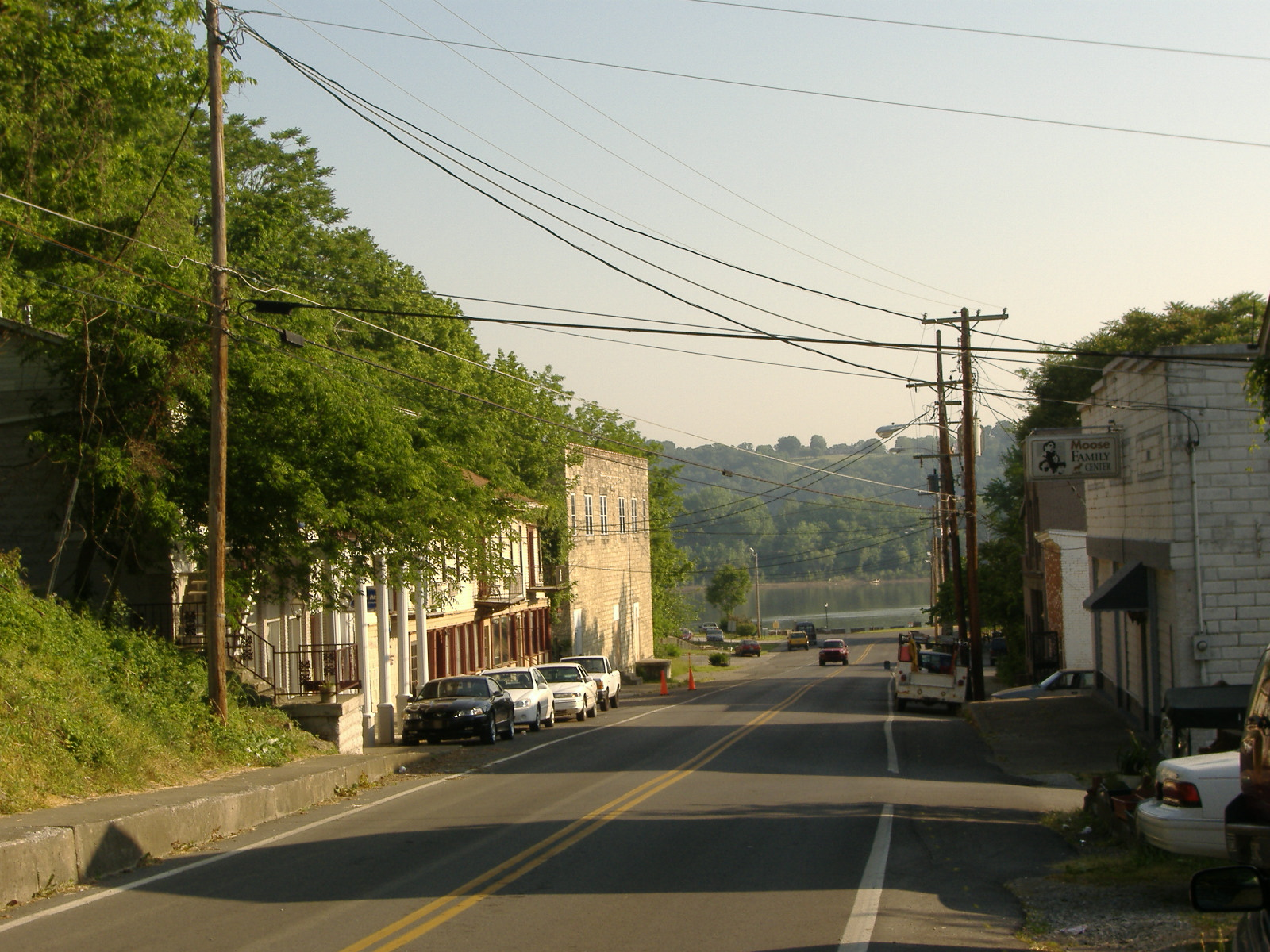
Downtown Brandenburg

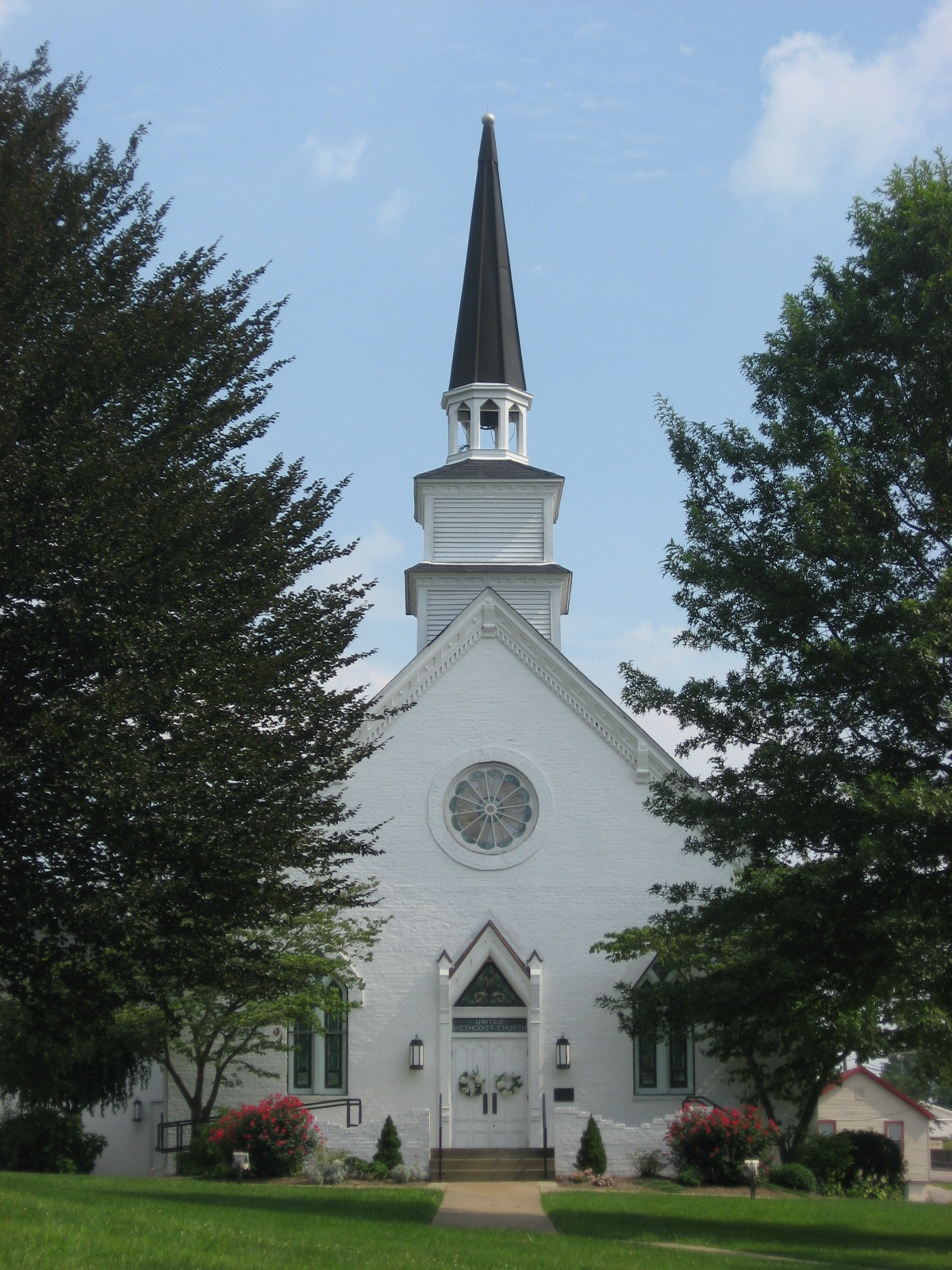
Brandenburg United Methodist Church

Brandenburg is a home rural-class city on the Ohio River in Meade County, Kentucky, in the United States. The city is 40 miles (64 km) southwest of Louisville. It is the seat of its county. The population was 2,894 at the 2020 census.

== History ==
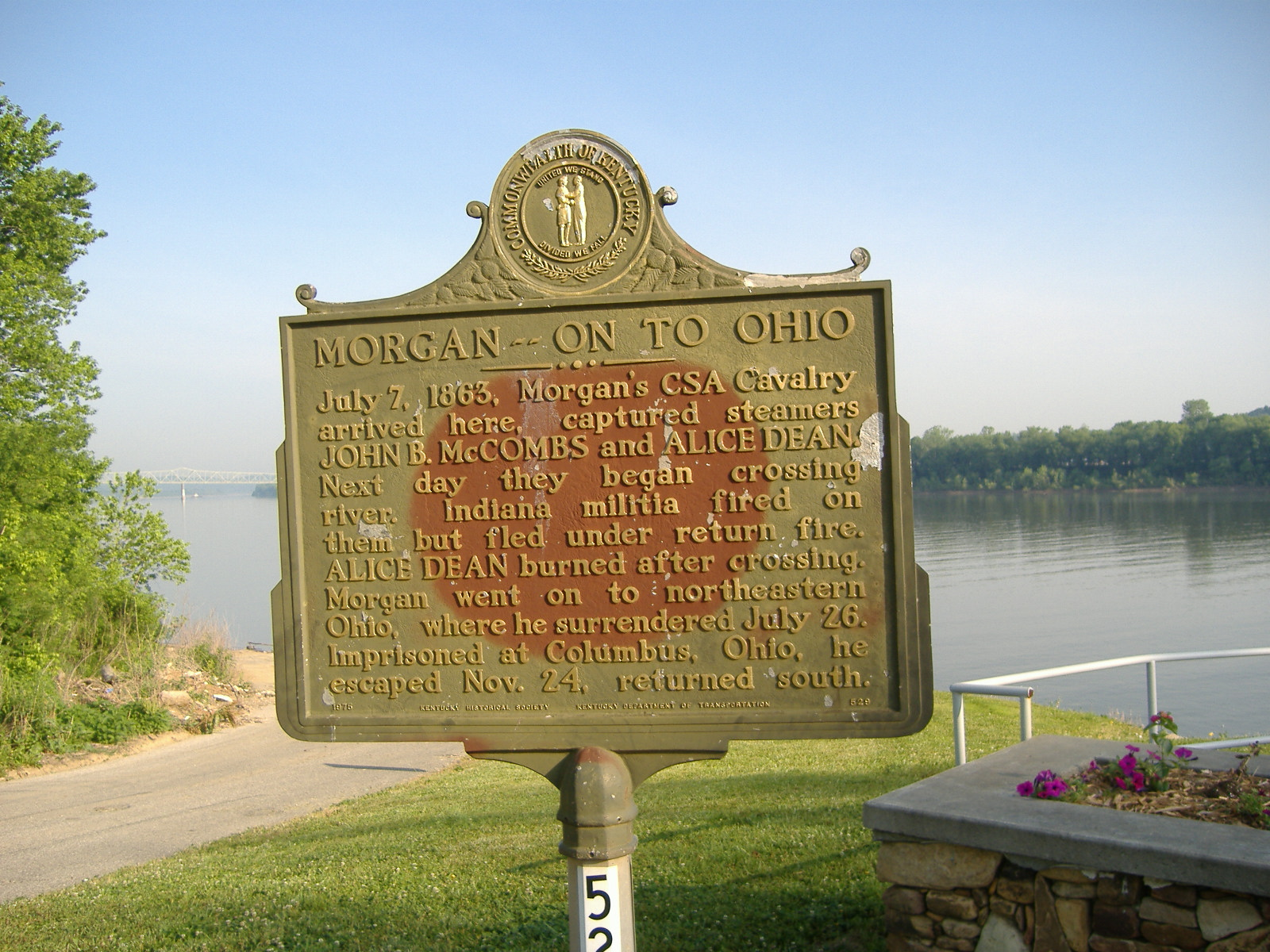
Historical marker noting John Hunt Morgan's activities at Brandenburg

Brandenburg was built on a 3,000-acre (12 km^{2}) tract of land called "Falling Springs", purchased in 1804 by Solomon Brandenburg. He opened a tavern around which the community grew. In 1825, the community became the seat of Meade County, but it wasn't formally incorporated by the state assembly until March 28, 1872.

During the Civil War, Confederate General John Hunt Morgan crossed at Brandenburg to start his raid into Indiana in July 1863. During the Battle of Brandenburg Crossing, two men on the Indiana side of the river were killed by cannon fire from Brandenburg. A Union gunship was deployed to block the crossing, but it ran out of ammunition and Morgan and his men were able to pass into Indiana.

Brandenburg was devastated by an F5 tornado during the Super Outbreak of April 3, 1974. The tornado had touched down near Hardinsburg and as it moved to the northeast grew into a half-mile wide wedge tornado, striking Brandenburg head on. The tornado killed 31 people and injured 270, with all but three of the fatalities and most of the injuries occurring at Brandenburg. 128 homes and 30 businesses were also destroyed. There was no early warning from tornado sirens or NOAA Weather Wire Service about the storm. About an hour after the storm, the same supercell spawned an F4 tornado that formed in the southwest part of Louisville in Jefferson County near Kosmosdale. Three people lost their lives in this storm, but it also left two hundred and seven injuries. The Brandenburg tornado remains as the only F5/EF5 tornado in Kentucky state history since official record keeping began in 1950, although later that day another F5 that hit Cincinnati, Ohio crossed the Ohio River from Indiana into Kentucky then into Ohio.

The Confederate Monument in Louisville was relocated to Brandenburg in late 2017 and rededicated in 2018.

== Geography ==
Brandenburg is located in north-central Meade County at 37°59′34″N 86°10′29″W (37.992664, -86.174657), along the south bank of the Ohio River. The Matthew E. Welsh Bridge connects Brandenburg with Mauckport across the river in Indiana. According to the United States Census Bureau, the city has a total area of 4.11 square miles (10.6 km^{2}), of which 0.02 square miles (0.05 km^{2}), or 0.44%, are water.

== Demographics ==
Historical population
Census	Pop.	Note	%±
1830	331		—
1860	618		—
1870	427		−30.9%
1880	587		37.5%
1890	495		−15.7%
1900	218		−56.0%
1910	482		121.1%
1920	503		4.4%
1930	484		−3.8%
1940	561		15.9%
1950	755		34.6%
1960	1,542		104.2%
1970	1,637		6.2%
1980	1,831		11.9%
1990	1,857		1.4%
2000	2,049		10.3%
2010	2,643		29.0%
2020	2,894		9.5%
2024 (est.)	2,974		2.8%
U.S. Decennial Census

=== 2020 census ===
As of the 2020 census, Brandenburg had a population of 2,894. The median age was 37.6 years. 23.1% of residents were under the age of 18 and 16.9% of residents were 65 years of age or older. For every 100 females there were 95.7 males, and for every 100 females age 18 and over there were 94.0 males age 18 and over.

0.0% of residents lived in urban areas, while 100.0% lived in rural areas.

There were 1,160 households in Brandenburg, of which 32.6% had children under the age of 18 living in them. Of all households, 33.1% were married-couple households, 20.8% were households with a male householder and no spouse or partner present, and 36.6% were households with a female householder and no spouse or partner present. About 34.5% of all households were made up of individuals and 13.8% had someone living alone who was 65 years of age or older.

There were 1,250 housing units, of which 7.2% were vacant. The homeowner vacancy rate was 1.9% and the rental vacancy rate was 5.3%.

Racial composition as of the 2020 census
Race	Number	Percent
White	2,535	87.6%
Black or African American	116	4.0%
American Indian and Alaska Native	8	0.3%
Asian	31	1.1%
Native Hawaiian and Other Pacific Islander	2	0.1%
Some other race	37	1.3%
Two or more races	165	5.7%
Hispanic or Latino (of any race)	100	3.5%

=== 2000 census ===
As of the 2000 census, there were 2,049 people, 844 households, and 535 families residing in the city. The population density was 518.0 inhabitants per square mile (200.0/km^{2}). There were 917 housing units at an average density of 231.8 per square mile (89.5/km^{2}). The racial makeup of the city was 94.05% White, 3.90% African American, 0.54% Native American, 0.24% from other races, and 1.27% from two or more races. Hispanic or Latino of any race were 0.83% of the population.

There were 844 households, out of which 33.6% had children under the age of 18 living with them, 43.4% were married couples living together, 15.6% had a female householder with no husband present, and 36.5% were non-families. 32.1% of all households were made up of individuals, and 12.9% had someone living alone who was 65 years of age or older. The average household size was 2.32 and the average family size was 2.92.

The age distribution was 26.2% under the age of 18, 9.6% from 18 to 24, 28.6% from 25 to 44, 20.0% from 45 to 64, and 15.6% who were 65 years of age or older. The median age was 36 years. For every 100 females, there were 87.6 males. For every 100 females age 18 and over, there were 82.7 males.

The median income for a household in the city was $36,351, and the median income for a family was $42,950. Males had a median income of $30,565 versus $21,143 for females. The per capita income for the city was $17,863. About 14.4% of families and 15.4% of the population were below the poverty line, including 19.3% of those under age 18 and 19.1% of those age 65 or over.

== Education ==
The Meade County Public Library was founded in 1955 and relocated to a new facility in 2011. The library, in the building that today is the Meade county history museum held the Brandenburg stone from the 1960s until 1996, and has again held the stone since 2012.

== Notable people ==
- Chip Jaenichen, former United States Maritime Administrator
- Rick Stansbury, college basketball coach

== In popular culture ==
Brandenburg is featured in the open world survival horror game Project Zomboid.

== See also ==
- List of cities and towns along the Ohio River
