= List of United States tornadoes in April 2025 =

List of tornadoes in the United States

United States tornadoes in April 2025
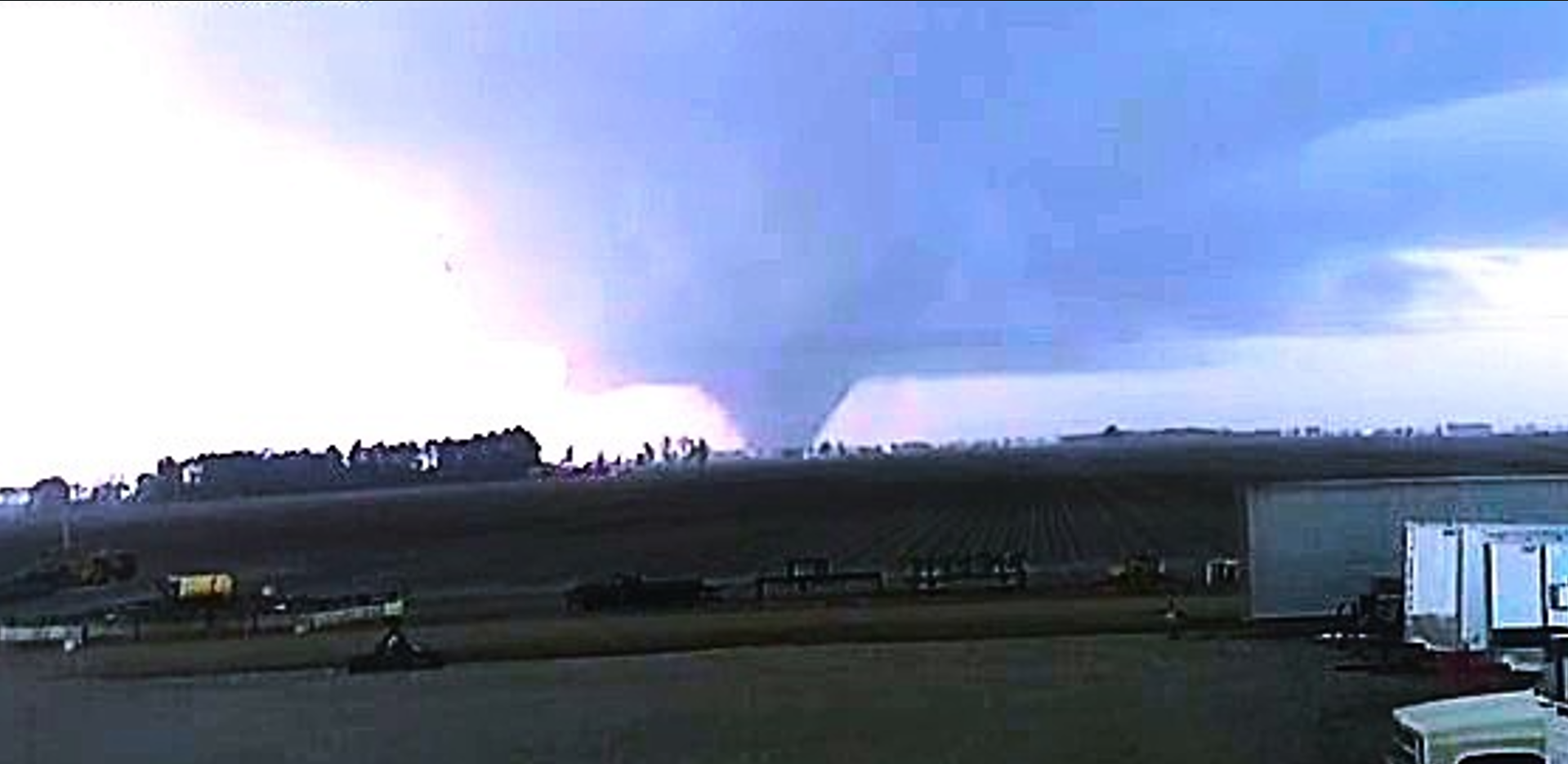
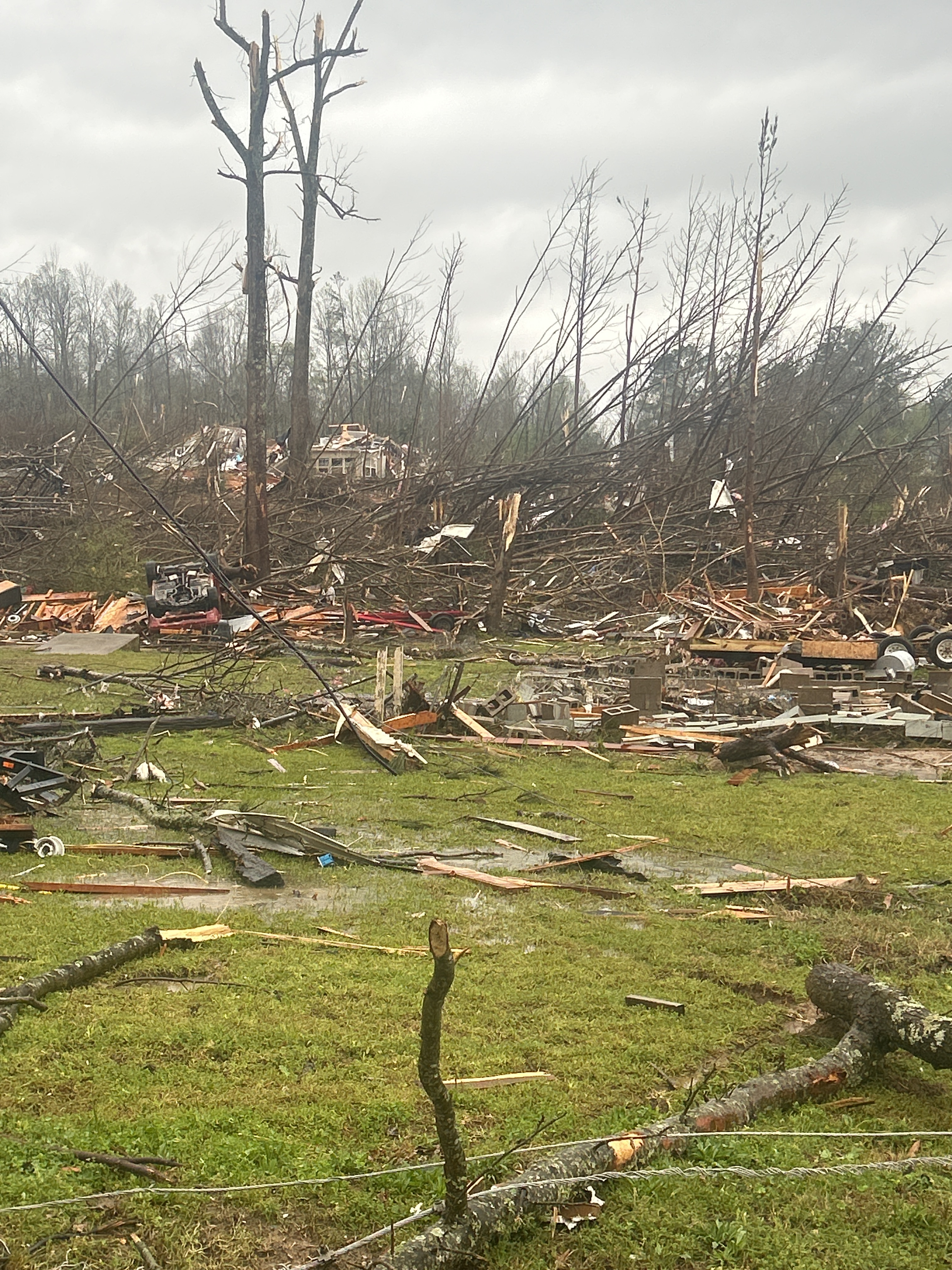
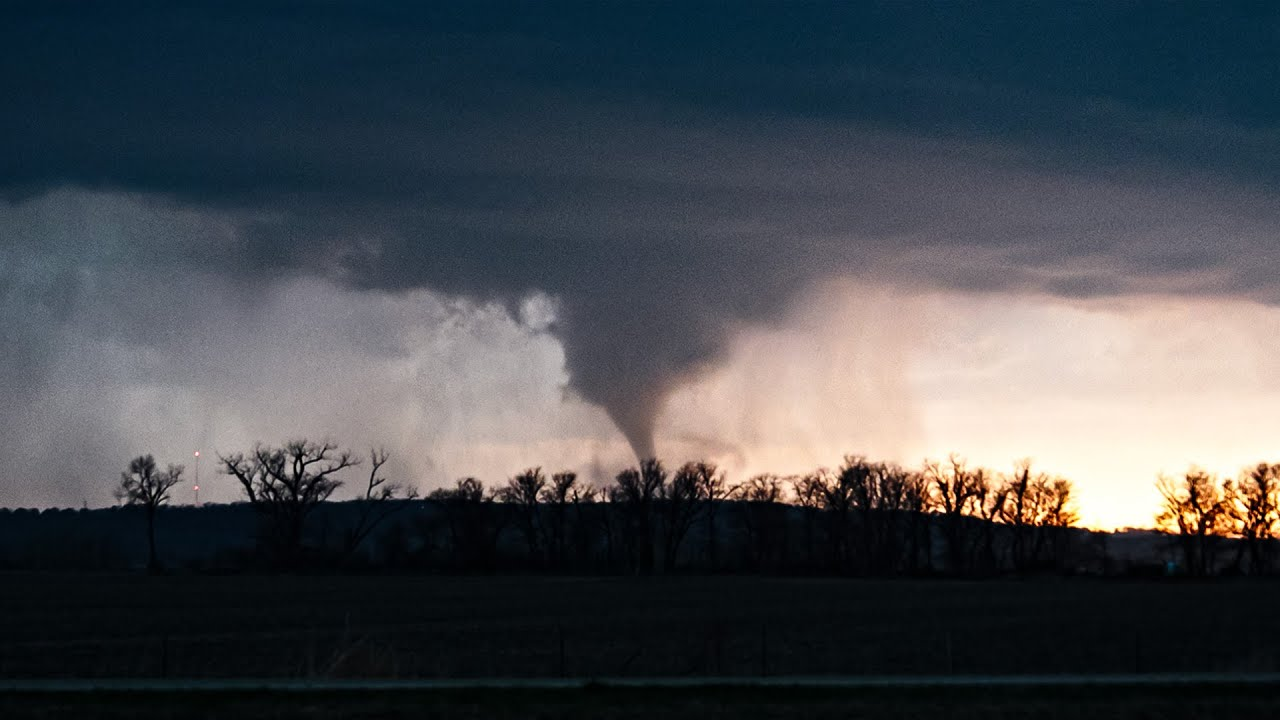
- Clockwise from top: An EF3 tornado near Lake City, Arkansas on April 2; an EF3 tornado near Bennington, Nebraska on April 17; damage in Selmer, Tennessee after a deadly EF3 tornado on April 3
- Timespan: April 1–30
- Maximum rated tornado: EF3 tornado: List; Latty, Missouri on April 2; Lake City, Arkansas on April 2; Jeffersontown, Kentucky on April 3; Senatobia, Mississippi on April 3; Selmer, Tennessee on April 3; Slayden, Mississippi on April 3; Florence, Nebraska on April 17; Seymour, Texas on April 29
- Tornadoes: 323
- Fatalities: 9
- Injuries: ~54

This page documents all tornadoes confirmed by various weather forecast offices of the National Weather Service in the United States in April 2025. Tornado counts are considered preliminary until final publication in the database of the National Centers for Environmental Information. Based on the 1991–2020 average, about 182 tornadoes occur in the United States in April. Activity also tends to spread northward and westward in April compared to the cooler winter months and the Midwest and Great Plains tend to see increased activity, although the relative maxima remains in the southern states.

Despite not having any violent tornadoes, April was an especially active and destructive month for tornadoes. It started with a very large outbreak at the beginning of the month that spawned 156 tornadoes and triggered widespread flooding across several states. A lull in activity started during the middle of the month, but activity picked up with five days of tornadic activity in the Mississippi Valley during the latter half of that period. After another lull, the final seven days of the month featured scattered tornadic activity. The month finished significantly above average with 323 tornadoes, making it the third most active April on record, behind 2024 and 2011.

== April ==
Confirmed tornadoes by Enhanced Fujita rating
EFU	EF0	EF1	EF2	EF3	EF4	EF5	Total
52	84	137	42	8	0	0	323

=== April 1 event ===
List of confirmed tornadoes – Tuesday, April 1, 2025 (Note: All dates are based on the local time zone where the tornado touched down; however, all times are in Coordinated Universal Time for consistency.)
EF#	Location	County / parish	State	Start coord.	Time (UTC)	Path length	Max. width
EF0	ENE of Salida	Stanislaus	CA	37.72°N 121.05°W	21:13–21:15	0.9 mi (1.4 km)	70 yd (64 m)
EF0	A tornado moved through several orchards and properties, uprooting dozens of almond trees and snapping large tree branches. Minor structure damage was observed on the properties, including a patio roof ripped off, a broken window, an outbuilding and metal fence were displaced and a large trailer was lifted and moved approximately 20 ft (6.1 m).						
EFU	NNW of Egin	Fremont	ID	44.04°N 111.93°W	22:45–23:00	0.1 mi (0.16 km)	10 yd (9.1 m)
EFU	A brief and weak tornado touched down northwest of the St. Anthony Sand Dunes, causing no reported damage.						
EFU	SE of Carneiro	Ellsworth	KS	38.69°N 97.97°W	02:53–02:55	0.04 mi (0.064 km)	20 yd (18 m)
EFU	A brief tornado was reported. No damage was found.						
EFU	NNW of Smolan	Saline	KS	38.76°N 97.69°W	03:14–03:17	0.16 mi (0.26 km)	30 yd (27 m)
EFU	A trained spotter took a photo of a tornado. No damage occurred.						

=== April 2 event ===
List of confirmed tornadoes – Wednesday, April 2, 2025
EF#	Location	County / parish	State	Start coord.	Time (UTC)	Path length	Max. width
EF1	NW of Pawhuska	Osage	OK	36.764°N 96.448°W	10:13–10:18	3.7 mi (6.0 km)	250 yd (230 m)
EF1	Multiple power poles were snapped.						
EF1	NE of Turley to Owasso to Limestone	Tulsa, Rogers	OK	36.255°N 95.932°W	11:37–11:47	10.4 mi (16.7 km)	600 yd (550 m)
EF1	A high-end EF1 tornado developed west of US 75, damaging trees and industrial buildings. It then moved northeast into Owasso, affecting several neighborhoods where homes were damaged, trees were uprooted, and power poles were snapped. The tornado continued into Rogers county, damaging roofs and snapping large tree limbs before dissipating after it destroyed an outbuilding in Limestone.						
EFU	ENE of Butler	Bates	MO	38.3°N 94.27°W	12:02		
EFU	A tornado debris signature was noted on radar, but the area where it occurred was inaccessible, leading to an EFU rating. Preliminary information.						
EF0	ENE of Butler to W of Johnstown	Bates	MO	38.2753°N 94.2358°W	12:02–12:11	7.5 mi (12.1 km)	50 yd (46 m)
EF0	This high-end EF0 tornado touched down in an open field, causing minor damage to power poles, trees, and small outbuildings along its path. The tornado then damaged empty grain bins and some trees before lifting.						
EF2	NW of Bronaugh to Moundville to SW of Nevada	Vernon	MO	37.7329°N 94.5087°W	12:29–12:34	6.5 mi (10.5 km)	200 yd (180 m)
EF2	A low-end EF2 tornado caused significant damage to a home southwest of Moundville. The tornado continued northeast, damaging several homes, barns, and numerous trees as it moved through Moundville and dissipated shortly after.						
EF1	N of Bronaugh to Eastern Nevada to WNW of Walker	Vernon	MO	37.7246°N 94.4522°W	12:30–12:44	16.6 mi (26.7 km)	200 yd (180 m)
EF1	This tornado initially touched down and tracked northeast, damaging trees and barns as it overtook the Moundville EF2 tornado listed above. As it moved toward Nevada, it also damaged several homes and outbuildings. The tornado caused significant damage to numerous businesses as it crossed US 54 in Nevada and knocked over two sets of four railroad cars. The tornado continued to damage outbuildings and barns across open farmland before lifting.						
EF2	Pilot Grove to ENE of Chouteau Springs	Cooper	MO	38.86°N 92.93°W	13:34–13:40	6.3 mi (10.1 km)	200 yd (180 m)
EF2	The tornado began southwest of Pilot Grove, causing minor damage to an outbuilding before traveling northeast into town. It caused roof damage to homes, destroyed a manufactured home, and uprooted trees onto another home. The tornado intensified to low-end EF2 strength near a newly built barndominium, severely damaging it, and then causing widespread damage to homes, outbuildings, and power poles. The tornado weakened as it moved northward, with limited damage observed near I-70, where it dissipated.						
EFU	Western Buckeye	Maricopa	AZ	33.4323°N 112.7215°W	18:00–18:10	0.45 mi (0.72 km)	5 yd (4.6 m)
EFU	A landspout was recorded over an open field in Buckeye.						
EF3	WNW of Berryman to Floyd to NW of Old Mines	Crawford, Washington	MO	37.8737°N 91.1336°W	20:13–20:39	21.95 mi (35.33 km)	200 yd (180 m)
EF3	This tornado touched down south of Berryman and moved northeastward, causing mainly minor EF0 tree damage as it approached Route 8. As the tornado approached Floyd, it intensified to EF1 intensity, snapping trees. It also inflicted minor damage to mobile homes, snapped a power pole, and damaged more trees. The tornado then rapidly intensified and reached high-end EF3 intensity as it crossed Route 185 between Ebo and Latty, leveling a home. Another home nearby suffered low-end EF3 damage with the entire top half of the home removed and multiple exterior walls knocked down and trees and power poles were snapped. The tornado then quickly weakened to EF1 intensity before gradually weakening as it continued northeastward, snapping trees and tree branches before dissipating.						
EF1	NE of South Fork	Howell	MO	36.6628°N 91.8988°W	20:16–20:21	1.13 mi (1.82 km)	350 yd (320 m)
EF1	Numerous trees were uprooted and the metal roof of a small farm building was ripped off.						
EF0	NW of Latham to N of Maroa	Logan, Macon, DeWitt	IL	39.98°N 89.18°W	20:40–20:52	12.7 mi (20.4 km)	30 yd (27 m)
EF0	A power pole was snapped and a tree was uprooted and a barn suffered very minor roof damage.						
EF0	NNE of Mercer to WSW of Bemis	Madison	TN	35.5457°N 88.9741°W	21:21–21:26	1.89 mi (3.04 km)	150 yd (140 m)
EF0	Minor roof damage occurred to several homes and multiple trees were uprooted, one of which fell onto a mobile home.						
EF1	SE of Loda	Iroquois	IL	40.4881°N 88.0557°W	22:00–22:02	2.3 mi (3.7 km)	400 yd (370 m)
EF1	Power poles and outbuildings were damaged.						
EF2	WNW of Pierron to SW of Shafter	Bond, Fayette	IL	38.7869°N 89.5416°W	22:05–22:29	22.83 mi (36.74 km)	200 yd (180 m)
EF2	This tornado initially touched down near Pierron, heavily damaging or destroying multiple outbuildings at EF1 intensity. Moving northeastward, the tornado intensified to high-end EF1 strength northeast of the town, snapping numerous trees before further intensifying to high-end EF2 strength south of Stubblefield. Mobile homes were destroyed, a home was left with only interior walls standing, multiple garages were destroyed, and more trees were snapped. Other outbuildings suffered moderate damage, and another home also suffered minor damage. The tornado then weakened significantly to EF0 strength and passed south of Greenville, snapping tree branches and inflicting minor damage to homes and outbuildings as it continued northeastward past Smithboro. Northwest of Mulberry Grove, the tornado restrengthened to EF1 intensity, destroying multiple outbuildings. The tornado then steadily weakened after that, causing only very minor tree damage before dissipating near Shafter. One person was injured.						
EF0	W of Cissna Park	Iroquois	IL	40.5542°N 87.9397°W	22:08–22:11	2.2 mi (3.5 km)	300 yd (270 m)
EF0	Outbuildings at a farm were damaged with the debris deposited downstream over open farmland.						
EF1	NNW of Budapest	Ripley	MO	36.7961°N 90.7364°W	22:32–22:34	1.13 mi (1.82 km)	125 yd (114 m)
EF1	A tornado tracked northeast, crossing Route K where considerable tree damage occurred on either side. Several homes suffered damage, with one experiencing significant roof damage. A few outbuildings were either moved or damaged. The tornado’s path beyond this area is unclear due to limited access and a poor road network.						
EF2	SE of Pocahontas to E of Corning	Randolph, Clay	AR	36.2349°N 90.9378°W	22:56–23:25	24.84 mi (39.98 km)	500 yd (460 m)
EF2	This EF2 tornado began southeast of Pocahontas and moved through Skaggs where it caused extensive roof damage to several homes and compromised outside walls. Several outbuildings were completely destroyed and numerous large trees were uprooted, consistent with EF2 intensity and winds around 125 mph (201 km/h). As the tornado continued northeast, it moved into Old Reyno and crossed into Clay county where it destroyed multiple grain bins. It caused further damage in the Heelstring area, including significant destruction to a church and residences. The tornado continued across the area, snapping utility poles and uprooting trees. Minor structure damage was noted along the western side of Corning Lake. The tornado's final damage points were found along US 62 where minor damage occurred to outbuildings, trees, and power poles as the tornado dissipated.						
EF2	NE of Lodge Corner to Almyra to W of Crocketts Bluff	Arkansas	AR	34.3558°N 91.4491°W	22:56–23:04	8.4 mi (13.5 km)	100 yd (91 m)
EF2	A strong tornado began in a field and moved northeast, collapsing large electrical transmission towers and damaging outbuildings, trailers, and a metal building. The tornado continued across AR 130, causing significant damage to a garage and other structures. It caused the partial destruction of a boat shop, with walls collapsed and metal panels carried away. As it continued, it damaged another metal building, peeling roofing panels and collapsing a porch structure. Debris from the buildings was scattered across fields and power poles were downed. The tornado's path was obscured by flooding but the damage continued northeast with debris visible in fields and radar evidence indicating its track before ending in a field.						
EF1	SSE of Fisher to SE of Waldenburg	Poinsett	AR	35.4452°N 90.9406°W	22:59–23:08	7.47 mi (12.02 km)	400 yd (370 m)
EF1	Several utility poles and trees were snapped or damaged.						
EF1	SE of Altamont	Effingham	IL	39.0196°N 88.713°W	23:08–23:11	2.55 mi (4.10 km)	125 yd (114 m)
EF1	Multiple structures were damaged, but most notably, a home lost its roof.						
EF2	SE of McGee to SSW of Greenbrier	Wayne, Bollinger	MO	37.062°N 90.192°W	23:09–23:22	8.36 mi (13.45 km)	175 yd (160 m)
EF2	A strong tornado severely damaged an A-frame home, ripped most of the roof off a church and another house, and caused severe tree damage.						
EF1	SE of Almyra	Arkansas	AR	34.3959°N 91.4117°W	23:21–23:23	0.9 mi (1.4 km)	50 yd (46 m)
EF1	This high-end EF1 tornado likely began just south of Almyra where debris was found in a field. It then tracked northeast, crossing an area where several wooden power poles were snapped before dissipating in an open field.						
EF1	SE of Teutopolis to S of Woodbury	Effingham, Jasper	IL	39.1033°N 88.4356°W	23:23–23:29	8.31 mi (13.37 km)	100 yd (91 m)
EF1	A high-end EF1 tornado damaged outbuildings, caused minor damage to the roof of a house, bent five power poles, and damaged multiple trees.						
EF3	W of Trumann to Lake City to SW of Leachville	Poinsett, Craighead	AR	35.6752°N 90.592°W	23:26–23:55	24.18 mi (38.91 km)	1,500 yd (1,400 m)
EF3	See section on this tornado – Eight people were injured.						
EF2	SW of Cash to NW of Jonesboro	Craighead	AR	35.7489°N 90.9784°W	23:28–23:42	14.45 mi (23.26 km)	700 yd (640 m)
EF2	The tornado began just west of AR 18, causing tree damage and roof damage to multiple metal outbuildings. It continued northeast, crossing AR 226, where a farm outbuilding was destroyed, trees were snapped, and farm equipment was damaged. The most significant damage occurred along a county road where a grain silo was torn and twisted despite being bolted to the ground. As the tornado continued towards Herman, it snapped and uprooted trees, damaged the gymnasium roof at Westside High School, and destroyed several nearby farm shops. The tornado ended after causing additional tree damage along US 63.						
EF0	S of Woodbury to Jewett	Cumberland	IL	39.1816°N 88.302°W	23:28–23:33	4.03 mi (6.49 km)	150 yd (140 m)
EF0	Multiple roofs and trees were damaged by a high-end EF0 tornado.						
EF2	Toga to Delta to Blomeyer	Stoddard, Cape Girardeau	MO	37.1167°N 89.8842°W	23:32–23:52	14.80 mi (23.82 km)	600 yd (550 m)
EF2	A strong tornado tracked along Route 25 for most of its life, damaging approximately 200 structures, with severe roof damage inflicted to many of them. It snapped power poles and snapped or uprooted trees as well. An indirect fatality occurred after the tornado struck when a responding fire chief fell unconscious while checking on a vehicle that had been blown off of a roadway.						
EF2	N of Jewett, IL to Cleone, IL to New Goshen, IN	Cumberland (IL), Clark (IL), Edgar (IL), Vigo (IN)	IL, IN	39.2341°N 88.247°W	23:33–00:22	48.91 mi (78.71 km)	1,200 yd (1,100 m)
EF2	This strong, long-tracked tornado touched down, uprooting large trees and damaging an outbuilding. It traveled northeast causing mainly weak damage before reaching EF2 intensity where over 20 power poles and large hardwood trees were snapped along with outbuildings and garages being destroyed. The tornado then entered Indiana and struck New Goshen, ripping most roofing off many structures in town. A large garage was heavily damaged with some of its walls entirely picked up and tossed.						
EF1	SE of Vastus to N of Glennonville	Butler, Dunklin	MO	36.5115°N 90.3708°W	23:36–23:58	14.22 mi (22.88 km)	125 yd (114 m)
EF1	A tornado caused damage to over a dozen homes, with shingle or siding damage observed. It also snapped over a dozen power poles and destroyed several of them. Several grain bins were destroyed and many outbuildings sustained significant damage or were completely destroyed. The tornado eventually lifted after crossing the St. Francis River into Dunklin County.						
EF0	NE of Cherry Valley to SW of Payneway	Cross, Poinsett	AR	35.4423°N 90.6832°W	23:40–23:46	6.55 mi (10.54 km)	75 yd (69 m)
EF0	This high-end EF0 tornado caused mainly tree and power line damage across its path.						
EF1	SE of Doddridge to N of Gin City	Lafayette	AR	33.0609°N 93.833°W	23:48–23:59	7.63 mi (12.28 km)	250 yd (230 m)
EF1	A high-end EF1 tornado began by the Red River, crossing an open pasture and levee. It uprooted several trees and caused damage as it moved northeast, crossing an intersection and continuing over farmland. The tornado snapped seven wooden power poles along AR 160 west of Gin City before causing additional damage in the farmland area, snapping three more power poles and a few trees. A small section of a metal roof was also ripped off a home. The tornado finally lifted near a grove of trees behind a church.						
EF1	SSE of Rutland to Bourbon to NNE of Etna Green	Marshall, Kosciusko	IN	41.23°N 86.35°W	23:52–00:10	17.75 mi (28.57 km)	175 yd (160 m)
EF1	A fast-moving tornado snapped and uprooted trees, caused extensive roof damage to several homes, and inflicted sporadic damage to power poles.						
EF1	Southern Cape Girardeau, MO to NE of East Cape Girardeau, IL	Cape Girardeau (MO), Alexander (IL)	MO, IL	37.2692°N 89.5962°W	23:56–00:06	8.33 mi (13.41 km)	150 yd (140 m)
EF1	Minor structural damage occurred to apartments, businesses, and homes in Cape Girardeau. Power poles and trees were damaged as well.						
EF1	NE of Marshall to SE of Dennison to ESE of Elbridge	Clark, Edgar	IL	39.4188°N 87.6397°W	00:02–00:09	8.05 mi (12.96 km)	200 yd (180 m)
EF1	A tornado touched down, blowing two semi-trucks over on I-70. It then caused significant damage at a hog farm, destroying eight buildings and several trees with debris scattered along the tornado's path. Beyond the farm, the tornado continued to damage trees, power lines, and outbuildings before dissipating near the Indiana border.						
EF1	SSE of Reynoldsville to NW of Jonesboro	Union	IL	37.3507°N 89.403°W	00:08–00:20	10.93 mi (17.59 km)	50 yd (46 m)
EF1	This very narrow tornado initially tracked northward along IL 3/IL 146 before turning sharply northeastward and dissipating as it crossed IL 127/IL 146 near Jonesboro. Damage along the path was limited to snapped or uprooted trees.						
EF1	NW of Taylor	Lafayette	AR	33.1762°N 93.5273°W	00:17–00:18	0.27 mi (0.43 km)	75 yd (69 m)
EF1	A tornado touched down in a wooded area just west of AR 53. It uprooted multiple trees before crossing the highway where it continued to snap and uproot several more trees and tree tops before eventually lifting.						
EF1	W of West Atherton to NE of Minshall	Parke	IN	39.633°N 87.3544°W	00:24–00:31	10.78 mi (17.35 km)	120 yd (110 m)
EF1	One home and two other structures sustained high-end EF1 tornado damage. Trees were damaged as well.						
EF0	N of Anna	Union	IL	37.4837°N 89.2362°W	00:25–00:27	1.25 mi (2.01 km)	25 yd (23 m)
EF0	A few trees were snapped or uprooted.						
EF1	McMullin	Scott	MO	36.9503°N 89.6324°W	00:30–00:31	1.14 mi (1.83 km)	250 yd (230 m)
EF1	This high-end EF1 tornado completely destroyed an equipment building, severely damaged the roofs of multiple homes, and snapped or uprooted several trees.						
EF0	NW of Heth	St. Francis, Crittenden	AR	35.1311°N 90.5158°W	00:35–00:38	3.06 mi (4.92 km)	75 yd (69 m)
EF0	A center irrigation pivot was overturned and a few power poles and trees were knocked down.						
EF2	N of Buncombe	Johnson	IL	37.483°N 88.9934°W	00:36–00:43	5.78 mi (9.30 km)	250 yd (230 m)
EF2	Hundreds of pine trees sustained severe damage. The roof was ripped off a house, a few outbuildings were destroyed, and a few cabins were damaged.						
EF1	Orland, IN to W of Pearl Beach, MI	Steuben (IN), Branch (MI)	IN, MI	41.724°N 85.171°W	00:46–00:54	10.82 mi (17.41 km)	600 yd (550 m)
EF1	A tornado touched down in Orland, destroying a small barn and uprooting trees before damaging the roof of an apartment building. It then caused significant tree damage across various properties and moved northeast, crossing into Michigan. The tornado reached its maximum intensity near a farm, tearing roofs off silos, destroying a barn section, and damaging a home with debris. The tornado dissipated after causing additional light structural and tree damage.						
EF1	WNW of East Gilead to Bethel	Branch	MI	41.785°N 85.115°W	00:49–00:52	3.73 mi (6.00 km)	125 yd (114 m)
EF1	This tornado caused tree damage near its touch down location before continuing northeast, affecting multiple Amish properties. The most significant damage occurred on a road west of Bethel where numerous large trees were snapped or uprooted and a home sustained major damage, though repairs had already been made. The wind speeds that damaged the home could not be estimated due to the completed repairs.						
EF1	E of Creal Springs	Williamson	IL	37.6124°N 88.8099°W	00:51–00:55	3.36 mi (5.41 km)	75 yd (69 m)
EF1	Trees were snapped or uprooted, a home sustained roof damage, and a carport was destroyed.						
EF2	NNW of Columbus to SSW of Blandville	Carlisle	KY	36.8334°N 89.1289°W	01:00–01:09	9.73 mi (15.66 km)	200 yd (180 m)
EF2	A strong tornado snapped power poles and lifted a garage off its foundation, moving it a short distance. Dozens of trees were snapped or uprooted along the tornado's path as well. This tornado may have started west of the Mississippi River.						
EF2	NE of Danville to Brownsburg to Northwestern Indianapolis	Hendricks, Marion	IN	39.805°N 86.4958°W	01:05–01:21	13.03 mi (20.97 km)	200 yd (180 m)
EF2	A strong tornado began in rural areas between Danville and Brownsburg before reaching the southern part of downtown Brownsburg where it caused sporadic tree and roof damage. The most significant damage occurred where several warehouses were damaged. One injury occurred when a warehouse wall caved in. Over 20 homes in a nearby neighborhood sustained roof and minor structural damage. Additional tree damage was observed in Eagle Creek Park before the tornado lifted near I-65.						
EF1	NW of Equality to WNW of Ridgway	Saline, Gallatin	IL	37.7749°N 88.3899°W	01:14–01:20	5.14 mi (8.27 km)	300 yd (270 m)
EF1	Trees were snapped or uprooted, a wooden power pole was snapped, and a few outbuildings lost their roofs.						
EF1	NE of Brownsburg	Hendricks	IN	39.8637°N 86.3536°W	01:15–01:17	1.53 mi (2.46 km)	300 yd (270 m)
EF1	A tornado began in a field where ground scouring was noted in high-resolution satellite imagery. It moved east, causing minor damage by bending a small utility pole before reaching a subdivision where several homes had roof and siding damage. The tornado then tracked northeast, crossing another road and destroying two older barns and a silo. Debris was scattered about a quarter mile northeast with ground scouring and a debris field observed.						
EF1	Northern Dyersburg	Dyer	TN	36.04°N 89.42°W	01:15–01:21	5.11 mi (8.22 km)	100 yd (91 m)
EF1	This tornado touched down on the northwest side of Dyersburg and tracked east-northeast across the northern part of the city. The damage consisted mainly of fallen trees and power lines, minor roof damage, and minor structural damage. Sixteen houses were damaged along with one public building and seven businesses. The tornado lifted near David Road near the US 51 and US 412 junction.						
EF2	W of Gage to Northern Paducah	Ballard, McCracken	KY	36.996°N 88.9278°W	01:18–01:34	19.07 mi (30.69 km)	1,000 yd (910 m)
EF2	A low-end EF2 tornado snapped power poles and damaged several barns and outbuildings near Gage, one barn which was completely destroyed. The tornado then caused significant damage to a church, injuring four people who were sheltering under an awning. Upon entering McCracken county, the tornado severely damaged another church adjacent to Barkley Regional Airport. Trees, power poles, and some homes and businesses were damaged as the tornado tracked through the northern parts of Paducah before lifting right at the shore of the Ohio River.						
EF1	S of Cottonwood to W of New Haven	Gallatin, White	IL	37.8562°N 88.2093°W	01:23–01:27	4.96 mi (7.98 km)	100 yd (91 m)
EF1	This tornado touched down and traveled northeast, causing minor roof and siding damage to several homes. It severely damaged a large barn and uprooted or snapped some isolated trees along its path. The tornado caused partial damage to solar panels just east of a road crossing. After crossing the Little Wabash River into White county, the tornado continued to damage trees and overturned an irrigation pivot before dissipating.						
EF1	Carmel	Hamilton	IN	39.9558°N 86.1542°W	01:28–01:35	6.6 mi (10.6 km)	150 yd (140 m)
EF1	This tornado touched down southwest of downtown Carmel, causing damage to an office building with uprooted trees converging toward the structure. It continued northeast, damaging the roofs and siding of several homes and apartment buildings along with numerous uprooted or snapped trees. The damage path was intermittent, with breaks of up to a third of a mile with little to no damage. Most of the damage ended near the White River.						
EF1	ESE of Trimble to NE of Kenton	Gibson, Obion	TN	36.1699°N 89.113°W	01:35–01:46	9.3 mi (15.0 km)	350 yd (320 m)
EF1	A tornado began near an intersection where it caused multiple trees to be snapped at the tops and damaged the roof of a single-family home. It continued northeast, snapping more trees and causing additional roof damage to homes. One home had its siding peeled off and a nearby carport was damaged. The tornado intensified as it moved across open fields, causing significant tree damage and roof damage to barns and homes. It then crossed US 45W where several homes had minor roof damage and additional trees were snapped or uprooted. The tornado continued through fields, damaging more homes and uprooting trees before lifting after crossing a road.						
EF2	SE of Fishersburg	Madison	IN	40.04°N 85.8445°W	01:43–01:46	2.15 mi (3.46 km)	250 yd (230 m)
EF2	A brief but strong tornado caused significant damage at a large farm where both a home and several outbuildings were heavily damaged. Debris was scattered from west to northeast with some of it being deposited over a mile away.						
EF2	E of Unionville, IL to NW of Tiline, KY	Massac (IL), Pope (IL), Livingston (KY)	IL, KY	37.1224°N 88.5038°W	01:43–01:52	12.07 mi (19.42 km)	150 yd (140 m)
EF2	A home sustained roof damage, utility poles were snapped, and trees were damaged.						
EF1	N of Fishersburg to SW of Prosperity	Madison	IN	40.0808°N 85.8606°W	01:46–01:55	11.57 mi (18.62 km)	150 yd (140 m)
EF1	A tornado likely started in a field near a farm and caused significant damage to several barns and a grain silo, including the destruction of an L-shaped pole barn. It also damaged a garage, lifting the roof and collapsing the walls. The tornado continued northeast over mainly rural land before dissipating.						
EF2	N of St. Philip to N of Darmstadt	Posey, Vanderburgh	IN	38.0023°N 87.7132°W	01:51–02:02	10.97 mi (17.65 km)	150 yd (140 m)
EF2	This strong tornado began north of St. Philip and tracked northeast into Vanderburgh county, causing significant damage as it crossed SR 66. Several homes suffered major roof damage and extensive tree damage occurred, particularly with snapped pines. As the tornado crossed SR 65 and moved near Darmstadt, numerous homes sustained roof or siding damage with many trees snapped or uprooted along the path. The tornado ended just north of Darmstadt.						
EF1	Blairsville	Posey	IN	38.07°N 87.77°W	01:52–01:53	1.13 mi (1.82 km)	75 yd (69 m)
EF1	This brief tornado moved through Blairsville. Several homes had shingle, soffit, or siding damage and trees were snapped or uprooted as well.						
EF0	NE of Anderson to Western Yorktown	Madison, Delaware	IN	40.1575°N 85.6126°W	01:52–02:02	4.92 mi (7.92 km)	100 yd (91 m)
EF0	A high-end, intermittent EF0 tornado snapped the tops off of trees and caused roofing and siding damage to multiple structures.						
EF1	NW of Evansville to Northwestern Highland to SE of Buckskin	Vanderburgh, Warrick, Gibson	IN	38.0292°N 87.5993°W	01:55–02:14	17.33 mi (27.89 km)	230 yd (210 m)
EF1	This tornado touched down northeast of Montoux Park, moving northeast and causing minor roof damage to homes and uprooting trees in Highland. It then crossed US 41 and continued northeast, snapping trees and causing minor roof damage in areas between Hillsdale and Earle. The tornado moved through the north side of a neighborhood, damaging roofs, fences, and outbuildings. It crossed I-69 and continued into Warrick county, affecting the north side of Elberfeld before crossing I-64. Further northeast, the tornado impacted another neighborhood, damaging roofs and destroying several sheds. It then crossed SR 68, causing more roof damage and affecting barns and trees in Gibson county before lifting.						
EF2	SE of Moonville to NW of Shideler	Madison, Delaware	IN	40.1882°N 85.5945°W	01:57–02:17	15.15 mi (24.38 km)	200 yd (180 m)
EF2	A strong tornado began in a wooded area south of a farm and hit the first homestead, ripping the fireplace off the home, blowing part of the roof off, and damaging a wall. Several old outbuildings with weak mortar holding them in place were completely destroyed and an old barn was shifted off its foundation, losing its roof. As the tornado moved northeast, it caused significant damage to multiple structures, continuing its path of destruction up to just southwest of Eaton before lifting.						
EF2	WNW of Latham to SW of Austin Springs	Weakley	TN	36.4404°N 88.797°W	02:00–02:12	6.38 mi (10.27 km)	350 yd (320 m)
EF2	A low-end EF2 tornado touched down just east of the Obion county line, causing significant tree damage and destroying a metal barn. A nearby home suffered minor roof damage. As the tornado continued east, it caused more tree damage and significant roof damage to a home along with several trees being snapped or uprooted. The tornado intensified as it reached another area where it severely damaged a home’s roof, displaced a manufactured home, and collapsed a garage. Most of the trees in this area were uprooted or snapped. The tornado continued northeast, causing additional tree damage and minor roof damage to a home and outbuilding. It eventually lifted before reaching Austin Springs.						
EF1	NW of Darmstadt to S of Warrenton	Vanderburgh	IN	38.1158°N 87.5975°W	02:01–02:05	4.08 mi (6.57 km)	75 yd (69 m)
EF1	This tornado damaged several trees and outbuildings and some homes experienced roof or siding damage. A grain bin was destroyed with debris thrown approximately 499 yd (456 m) into a field. The tornado then dissipated near a golf club.						
EF1	NW of Muncie to SW of Shideler	Delaware	IN	40.2488°N 85.4646°W	02:04–02:08	5.81 mi (9.35 km)	200 yd (180 m)
EF1	A couple of outbuildings and a home suffered damage.						
EF1	Northern Boonville to SSE of Dickeyville	Warrick	IN	38.0596°N 87.2821°W	02:10–02:17	6.75 mi (10.86 km)	100 yd (91 m)
EF1	A tornado touched down in Boonville, causing minor roof damage and uprooting trees. It continued northeast through the Rolling Acres area, snapping and uprooting trees. As it crossed additional roads, it caused further damage to trees and some roof shingles. The tornado continued causing tree damage before lifting near a rural intersection.						
EF1	SW of Boydsville, TN to SE of Murray, KY	Weakley (TN), Henry (TN), Graves (KY), Calloway (KY)	TN, KY	36.4756°N 88.5689°W	02:17–02:32	17.49 mi (28.15 km)	200 yd (180 m)
EF1	Numerous outbuildings were destroyed, extensive tree damage occurred, and roofs were blown from homes in rural Calloway county. As it entered into southern Murray, the tornado caused shingle damage to some homes and blew the roof of an auto-repair shop before it lifted.						
EF1	Northern Madisonville to E of Slaughters	Hopkins	KY	37.3354°N 87.5385°W	02:34–02:43	12.55 mi (20.20 km)	50 yd (46 m)
EF1	This tornado began in western Madisonville, removing part of the roof from a Humane Society building, though no animals were harmed. It continued northeast, causing sporadic tree damage and damaging a home's roof and gutters as it crossed I-69. The tornado may have continued into McLean county near Jewel City, but the area was inaccessible due to flooding.						
EF1	SW of Willshire, OH (1st tornado)	Adams	IN	40.7°N 84.85°W	02:47–02:49	2.21 mi (3.56 km)	75 yd (69 m)
EF1	This tornado caused roof damage to several Amish properties which had already been repaired by the time the survey was completed. It also destroyed and partially destroyed well-built pole barns along its path. This tornado occurred simultaneously with, and on a parallel track to, the subsequent Adams county EF1 tornado.						
EF1	SW of Willshire, OH (2nd tornado)	Adams	IN	40.688°N 84.834°W	02:48–02:50	1.47 mi (2.37 km)	100 yd (91 m)
EF1	This tornado first damaged pole barns and poultry farms before removing the roof of a mobile home. It continued its path, tossing a grain silo up to half a mile away and collapsing part of a farm structure. This tornado occurred simultaneously with, and on a parallel track to, the previous Adams county EF1 tornado.						
EF0	SE of Heltonville	Lawrence	IN	38.9039°N 86.3462°W	02:57–02:58	0.06 mi (0.097 km)	20 yd (18 m)
EF0	A brief tornado damaged a pole barn, collapsing all but one of the walls and embedding two 2x4 planks into the ground nearby.						
EF2	WNW of Semiway to Calhoun to N of Buel	McLean	KY	37.491°N 87.3043°W	02:58–03:06	9.49 mi (15.27 km)	200 yd (180 m)
EF2	This low-end EF2 tornado began in the Pack Church community and moved northeast. It caused damage to a historic brick building and a church steeple in downtown Calhoun, as well as to the roof of a nearby home. The tornado continued through the east side of Calhoun, damaging trees in a city park and outbuildings at the 4H fairgrounds. It snapped two power transmission poles and severely damaged an outbuilding along KY 136 before crossing KY 250 where it damaged another outbuilding and snapped large hardwood trees before lifting.						
EF1	SE of Glenmore	Van Wert	OH	40.7749°N 84.6975°W	02:58–03:00	0.81 mi (1.30 km)	50 yd (46 m)
EF1	A brief tornado destroyed an outbuilding and tossed debris 400 yards (370 m) away. Several trees were snapped as well.						
EF1	S of Van Wert to NW of Ottoville	Van Wert, Putnam	OH	40.8124°N 84.583°W	03:02–03:13	15.34 mi (24.69 km)	300 yd (270 m)
EF1	This tornado touched down south of Van Wert, destroying a barn before moving just outside the southeast corner of town and causing tree and shingle damage and destroying another two-story barn. It continued northeast, causing minor damage north of US 30, damaging a deer farm, and destroying a pole barn before dissipating.						
EF2	NE of Mandale to Dupont	Paulding, Putnam	OH	41.026°N 84.348°W	03:18–03:22	4.68 mi (7.53 km)	375 yd (343 m)
EF2	A strong tornado touched down, severely damaging a pole barn before quickly moving into Putnam county. It flipped a well-anchored mobile home at EF2 intensity, injuring two of the three occupants. The tornado destroyed another large pole barn and caused widespread damage in Dupont, including damage to several corn silos. The tornado dissipated shortly after exiting the town.						
EF2	SW of Shorts Corner to ESE of New Salem	Washington, Scott	IN	38.4893°N 86.113°W	03:20–03:33	15.76 mi (25.36 km)	600 yd (550 m)
EF2	A low-end EF2 tornado caused significant damage, especially near a community church where the roof was severely damaged and gravestones in the cemetery were knocked over. A mobile home was destroyed and rolled 75 yards (69 m), with a chest freezer thrown 100 yards (91 m) into the cemetery. The worst damage occurred near a water tower, with the tornado causing widespread tree fall and structural damage. Additional damage occurred to mobile homes, barns, and trees along the tornado's path. The tornado continued northeast, snapping and uprooting trees and causing minor damage to homes. The tornado's path ended in a heavily forested area just across the Washington/Scott county border where sporadic straight-line wind damage was observed.						
EF1	Northern New Albany	Floyd	IN	38.3142°N 85.8399°W	03:53–03:56	2.24 mi (3.60 km)	500 yd (460 m)
EF1	This tornado began just west of an intersection where it snapped several power poles and caused tree damage near a cemetery and nearby neighborhood. It continued east-northeast, impacting a flat area south of Sam Peden Community Park. The tornado caused notable damage in a swath, including tree damage at a preschool and the displacement of a dumpster. Several trees were downed along another road before the tornado lifted.						

=== April 3 event ===
List of confirmed tornadoes – Thursday, April 3, 2025
EF#	Location	County / parish	State	Start coord.	Time (UTC)	Path length	Max. width
EF0	E of Murray to W of New Concord	Calloway	KY	36.6138°N 88.2815°W	04:23–04:31	8.92 mi (14.36 km)	100 yd (91 m)
EF0	This high-end EF0 tornado began east of Murray along KY 94 where it damaged the roof of a commercial building and a nearby church. The tornado continued damaging outbuildings and uprooting trees before lifting on the western shore of Kentucky Lake.						
EF0	ENE of Cedar Grove, IN to NNW of Millville	Franklin (IN), Butler (OH)	IN, OH	39.3757°N 84.8662°W	04:23–04:33	11 mi (18 km)	300 yd (270 m)
EF0	A high-end EF0 tornado touched down north of the community of Sharptown, uprooting and snapping several trees. It continued northeast, causing additional tree damage and minor structural damage as it crossed into Ohio. The tornado moved through the Pater Wildlife Area, snapping numerous trees visible from nearby roads. Further damage to homes, outbuildings, and trees occurred, with power poles snapped along the path. As it continued northeast, the tornado weakened and caused more tree damage before dissipating.						
EF0	W of Clyde	Sandusky	OH	41.3207°N 83.0418°W	04:25–04:27	0.72 mi (1.16 km)	15 yd (14 m)
EF0	This weak tornado with peak winds estimated at 85 mph (137 km/h) caused damage to two barns, leaving debris near US 20. The tornado also left visible marks of rotation in a field.						
EF3	Jeffersontown to Boston	Jefferson	KY	38.1864°N 85.582°W	04:29–04:39	9.68 mi (15.58 km)	350 yd (320 m)
EF3	This intense tornado touched down near an industrial area, initially causing tree damage before intensifying as it moved northeast. It caused significant structural damage, including peeling roofs from metal warehouses, destroying buildings, and scattering debris over large distances. The tornado then reached its peak intensity in eastern Jeffersontown, tearing apart buildings, uprooting trees, and throwing debris up to a mile away. It caused major damage to several commercial properties, including warehouse buildings where their braces failed, and other structures lost roofs and walls. Vehicles were moved, windows blown out, and HVAC units were displaced. The tornado continued northeast, causing roof and siding damage to homes and uprooting trees in residential areas. It weakened and ended with minor damage in a forested area.						
EF0	ENE of Five Points to SSE of Centerville	Warren, Montgomery	OH	39.5725°N 84.1612°W	04:58–05:01	2.98 mi (4.80 km)	200 yd (180 m)
EF0	Numerous trees were damaged and several homes had minor siding damage.						
EF0	Northeastern Maineville to Roachester to NE of Hicks	Warren	OH	39.3197°N 84.186°W	05:02–05:10	8.51 mi (13.70 km)	200 yd (180 m)
EF0	The tornado began in northeastern Maineville where it caused tree and garage damage. It moved northeast, causing more significant tree damage until impacting a subdivision where it inflicted minor damage to homes and damaged more trees. The tornado paralleled US 22 where it removed a metal roof from an outbuilding and uprooted several trees, one of which fell onto a home, before lifting.						
EF2	S of Hopewell, MS to SE of Middleton, TN	Benton (MS), Tippah (MS), Hardeman (TN)	MS, TN	34.9524°N 89.0531°W	05:07–05:23	12.51 mi (20.13 km)	450 yd (410 m)
EF2	This strong tornado began on US 72, causing tree damage and damaging a manufactured home. As it moved northeast into Tippah County, more trees were uprooted, and additional damage to a home was noted. The tornado continued northeast, causing more tree damage and destroying a manufactured home before crossing into Hardeman County in Tennessee. In Hardeman County, the tornado moved through a forested area and then caused significant tree damage as it passed through several rural areas. The tornado crossed SR 125, downing more trees, damaging a home’s roof, and tearing off roof panels from a small barn. The tornado eventually dissipated just south of SR 57. Three injuries occurred.						
EF1	SE of Bardstown to W of Fredericktown	Nelson	KY	37.7521°N 85.4226°W	05:16–05:19	1.97 mi (3.17 km)	175 yd (160 m)
EF1	This tornado began on a hilltop, uprooting several trees and causing significant damage to barns and outbuildings as it tracked east-northeast. The worst damage occurred to a small outbuilding where only one wall remained standing, and debris was scattered up to 200 yards (180 m) away. A nearby house sustained minor fascia damage with slight buckling of brick columns. As the tornado continued, it crossed another road, causing scattered tree damage and minor roof damage to several homes. Multiple barns and small outbuildings were damaged, including a well-built barn whose roof collapsed. The tornado continued northeast, causing isolated tree damage and further damaging barns and lean-tos. It ultimately lifted near a road with no additional significant damage found downstream.						
EF0	N of Fayetteville to Southern Lynchburg	Brown, Highland, Clinton	OH	39.199°N 83.93°W	05:17–05:24	7.88 mi (12.68 km)	250 yd (230 m)
EF0	A tornado began near US 68, destroying a barn and throwing debris into a field. It continued northeast, downing numerous trees on the campus of Chatfield College. As the tornado progressed northeast, it caused tree damage, removed siding and shingles from a home, and downed large limbs. The tornado dissipated near southern Lynchburg, where more tree damage was observed along SR 134.						
EF0	N of St. Martin to WNW of Lynchburg	Clinton	OH	39.2494°N 83.8805°W	05:19–05:22	2.7 mi (4.3 km)	100 yd (91 m)
EF0	A weak tornado caused roof damage to an outbuilding. It continued along a short path where a barn was overturned, and large tree limbs were knocked over. The tornado ended with the destruction of another barn and additional tree damage.						
EF3	SE of Strayhorn to ESE of Coldwater	Tate	MS	34.5828°N 90.1044°W	05:24–05:39	12.22 mi (19.67 km)	650 yd (590 m)
EF3	An intense, high-end EF3 tornado touched down, uprooting several trees as it moved northeast. It intensified as it crossed a road, snapping several tree trunks, and caused severe damage near a local area with one home having multiple collapsed walls and another completely destroyed. The tornado continued its path, crossing MS 4, where additional tree damage occurred and light poles were damaged. It also caused roof damage to a home and further tree damage. After crossing another US 51 and I-55, the tornado caused more damage to homes and trees in a nearby neighborhood before lifting just prior to reaching a creek. Two people were injured.						
EF1	W of Hells Halfacre to Berry to Antioch	Harrison	KY	38.4869°N 84.4658°W	05:26–05:35	10.81 mi (17.40 km)	50 yd (46 m)
EF1	This tornado started by damaging the doors, roof and siding of a barn. The tornado then inflicted significant damage to a travel trailer and a home where part of the roof was torn off and boards were impaled into the house. Continuing northeast, it uprooted several trees near Berry and caused further damage across additional areas. The tornado flipped a camper and caused a barn to lean, then leveled another barn just south of US 27 before lifting.						
EF0	SSW of Sabina to SW of Washington Court House	Clinton, Fayette	OH	39.4424°N 83.6662°W	05:29–05:35	9.08 mi (14.61 km)	350 yd (320 m)
EF0	A high-end EF0 tornado began by knocking down power poles and removing the roofs of two barns along SR 72. As it continued eastward, it destroyed another barn, snapped trees, and caused roof and gutter damage to a home. The tornado scattered debris in multiple directions and downed additional power poles. As it crossed into Fayette county, it continued to cause roof damage to barns and additional tree damage along several roads. The tornado lifted after causing damage to a silo, marking the end of the observed damage path.						
EF3	NE of Pocahontas to Selmer to NW of Oak Grove	McNairy, Hardin	TN	35.1299°N 88.7171°W	05:34–06:07	29.15 mi (46.91 km)	650 yd (590 m)
EF3	5 deaths – See section on this tornado – 14 people were injured.						
EF0	Minerva	Mason	KY	38.7053°N 83.9183°W	05:52–05:55	1.79 mi (2.88 km)	150 yd (140 m)
EF0	This tornado touched down in the center of Minerva, causing minor damage. It followed a nearly identical path as an EF1 tornado from the year prior, moving northeast and causing damage to outbuildings, homes, and farm equipment. While weaker than the tornado from last year, it still produced significant damage. The tornado is believed to have dissipated near Lee Creek.						
EF2	NW of Griderville to SW of Bear Wallow	Barren	KY	37.1219°N 85.8939°W	06:04–06:09	4.89 mi (7.87 km)	400 yd (370 m)
EF2	This strong tornado first touched down near a barn, completely destroying it. The tornado continued over farmland, causing roof damage to several barns and a mobile home. Upon crossing US 31E, the tornado intensified, ripping the roof off a single-story home and also damaging barns and outbuildings. The tornado continued northeast, causing significant roof damage to homes while also snapping and uprooting trees. After crossing an area of open farmland, the damage lessened, with minor tree damage being noted as the tornado dissipated. One person was injured.						
EF3	NE of Red Banks, MS to Grand Junction, TN to SW of Hornsby, TN	Marshall (MS), Benton (MS), Fayette (TN), Hardeman (TN)	MS, TN	34.8902°N 89.5064°W	06:13–07:02	39.55 mi (63.65 km)	1,200 yd (1,100 m)
EF3	2 deaths – See section on this tornado – Three people were injured.						
EF1	ENE of Roachville to S of Elk Horn	Taylor	KY	37.2512°N 85.3896°W	06:29–06:35	6.97 mi (11.22 km)	125 yd (114 m)
EF1	This high-end EF1 tornado initially damaged cedar trees when it first touched down. Proceeding northeastward, the tornado damaged trees and roofs, including the roof of a garage barn. The tornado then crossed KY 55 and caused additional tree damage, uprooting trees and snapping large branches. Significant roof damage was reported at a local restaurant, with wind speeds reaching 110 miles per hour (180 km/h). The tornado continued, causing tree damage in Green River Lake State Park and rural areas before lifting near Green River Lake.						
EF1	SW of Rowland to ENE of Preachersville	Lincoln, Garrard	KY	37.5058°N 84.6543°W	07:07–07:15	8.99 mi (14.47 km)	90 yd (82 m)
EF1	This narrow tornado touched down near the intersection of US 27 and KY 698, where it collapsed a barn and toppled some softwood trees. It continued south, toppling and uprooting more trees near a creek. As it moved toward the Garrard County line, it caused significant damage, including the destruction of outbuildings, the removal of fence posts, and the tearing of fences across KY 39. A single-family home had minor roof damage, and several barns were damaged with panels and metal sheeting ripped apart. The tornado weakened as it approached a rural area where large tree limbs were downed and barns had minor damage before lifting.						
EF1	N of Walterhill to NW of Watertown	Wilson	TN	36.0573°N 86.3648°W	14:36–14:52	11.51 mi (18.52 km)	300 yd (270 m)
EF1	This tornado began northeast of the Nashville Superspeedway, causing timber and minor structural damage. It continued northeast where it inflicted minor damage on homes, including snapped trees and fences, and caused additional timber damage. As the tornado moved northeast, it caused significant tree damage with several hardwoods snapped or uprooted. Some homes had minor roof damage. The tornado also impacted farm structures before dissipating.						
EF1	Northwestern Glen, MS to Walnut Grove, TN	Alcorn (MS), Tishomingo (MS), Lauderdale (AL), Hardin (TN)	MS, AL, TN	34.8603°N 88.44°W	21:38–22:08	28.45 mi (45.79 km)	425 yd (389 m)
EF1	This long-tracked tri-state tornado touched down northeast of a county maintenance facility where it snapped and uprooted several trees, causing moderate damage to one home. It continued through a wooded area before crossing US 72, causing minor roof damage to a school and uprooting several trees. The tornado weakened after this, causing sporadic tree damage through a wooded area. As it moved northeast, it crossed MS 25 and entered JP Coleman State Park, where it caused more tree damage. It then crossed the Tennessee River into extreme northwestern Alabama, where it intensified and caused significant tree damage. The tornado continued northward, uprooting and snapping large trees before crossing into Tennessee with additional tree damage noted in Walnut Grove before the tornado lifted.						
EF0	WNW of Lawrenceburg	Lawrence	TN	35.3085°N 87.5036°W	22:57–22:58	0.07 mi (0.11 km)	25 yd (23 m)
EF0	This tornado was observed to be on the ground for thirty seconds. No damage occurred.						

=== April 4 event ===
List of confirmed tornadoes – Friday, April 4, 2025
EF#	Location	County / parish	State	Start coord.	Time (UTC)	Path length	Max. width
EF0	NW of Van to E of Grand Saline	Van Zandt	TX	32.5833°N 95.7041°W	20:17–20:30	9.01 mi (14.50 km)	75 yd (69 m)
EF0	One home lost part of a wall while another sustained roof damage. A manufactured home also sustained roof and porch damage. Several trees were snapped or uprooted.						
EF2	NE of Bogata to Eastern Clarksville to N of Annona	Red River	TX	33.4931°N 95.1707°W	20:27–21:06	21.11 mi (33.97 km)	580 yd (530 m)
EF2	A strong tornado began in Rosalie, intensifying quickly as it snapped hardwood and softwood trees. A home was heavily damaged, with its garage destroyed and a significant portion of its roof lost. The tornado continued northeast, causing extensive tree damage and partially lifting a pump jack in an oil field. The tornado then tracked through an area with snapped hardwood trees, leading to additional destruction of outbuildings. As it progressed, it caused more tree damage along its path and passed south of the Clarksville/Red River County Airport, with video footage confirming its movement. The tornado weakened as it moved northeast, with sporadic tree damage observed before lifting just north of Reeds Settlement.						
EF1	SE of Millerton to SSE of Bethel	McCurtain	OK	33.9582°N 94.9867°W	20:37–21:23	24.37 mi (39.22 km)	303 yd (277 m)
EF1	This tornado began just west of a local arena and south of US 70, where it uprooted and snapped numerous trees. As it continued its northeast path, the tornado caused tree damage near a home, where a small outbuilding collapsed. After crossing US 70, it caused extensive tree damage along a nearby road and blew the roof off another outbuilding, carrying it across the street. The tornado’s track continued northeast, where significant tree damage was observed, including many uprooted trees and snapped trunks. In the North Pole area, the tornado reached peak intensity, damaging a home with a large fallen tree. As it moved further, it damaged more trees along various roads and up a ridgeline before the track became difficult to trace due to inaccessibility. Despite limited road access, additional tree damage was found further northeast before dissipating shortly after.						
EF1	NE of Lindale to NW of Gilmer	Smith, Wood, Upshur	TX	32.5519°N 95.337°W	21:24–22:01	25.47 mi (40.99 km)	1,420 yd (1,300 m)
EF1	This high-end EF1 tornado began near the Sabine River Bottoms and tracked northeast, initially causing minor tree damage. It became more intense as it moved near Hawkins where numerous pine trees were snapped and one home suffered roof panel damage. The tornado continued northeast, snapping and uprooting trees, with one well-built carport failing into a home. The most significant damage was to a water bottling plant where roof damage occurred and one semi-truck driver was injured. The tornado then moved into open land with debris observed via radar as it caused further tree damage. As it crossed various roads, the tornado widened and continued causing tree damage with significant wind effects observed near Lake Gilmer where waves scoured pavement on a bridge. The tornado eventually lifted north of the lake.						
EF1	NNW of Gilmer	Upshur	TX	32.7933°N 94.9759°W	22:07–22:08	1.1 mi (1.8 km)	1,272 yd (1,163 m)
EF1	A brief but large tornado uprooted and snapped a few trees.						
EF2	Northern Lone Star	Morris	TX	32.9221°N 94.7387°W	22:32–22:41	4.27 mi (6.87 km)	673 yd (615 m)
EF2	This strong tornado began just north of Big Cypress Creek, downing trees and snapping trunks. It strengthened to EF2 intensity as it moved northeast, causing significant structural damage to homes, including one with a garage door buckled by tornadic winds, leading to roof removal. The tornado continued northeast, crossing Ellison Creek Reservoir and damaging a church camp, where numerous large trees were snapped and six cars were thrown 100 yards (91 m). The tornado then moved into a neighborhood, uprooting and snapping trees, causing damage to dozens of homes. It crossed US 259 and continued causing minor roof damage to a home before lifting near FM 3421.						
EF1	NW of Bodcaw	Hempstead, Nevada	AR	33.5741°N 93.4866°W	01:29–01:32	2.7 mi (4.3 km)	375 yd (343 m)
EF1	A few structures were damaged, including some chicken houses, and multiple trees were damaged.						

=== April 5 event ===
List of confirmed tornadoes – Saturday, April 5, 2025
EF#	Location	County / parish	State	Start coord.	Time (UTC)	Path length	Max. width
EF2	WSW of Colt to Levesque	St. Francis, Cross	AR	35.1217°N 90.8516°W	06:34-06:53	12.74 mi (20.50 km)	350 yd (320 m)
EF2	A strong tornado began by causing tree damage and minor roof damage to a home. It continued northeast, destroying a manufactured home along AR 306 and blowing away the debris. Several nearby homes had minor roof damage. Further damage was noted near AR 1 in Wilkins where a large outbuilding was shifted off its foundation and collapsed. The tornado also caused damage to a chemical plant, flipped a semi, and damaged numerous homes near Fitzgerald Crossing. The most significant damage in this area occurred to a very large metal outbuilding and several destroyed manufactured homes. The tornado then continued and damaged solar panels in a solar farm between AR 1 and Cathy Lake. It moved into a country club, causing significant damage and lofting a storage building 100 yards (91 m). The tornado impacted the Levesque area, destroying small outbuildings and uprooting multiple trees before lifting just east of AR 163. One person was injured.						
EF1	SE of Parkin to NNW of Earle	Cross, Crittenden	AR	35.2215°N 90.525°W	07:03–07:10	5.65 mi (9.09 km)	150 yd (140 m)
EF1	This tornado formed in far eastern Cross County, where minor damage was reported to a farm outbuilding. The tornado moved northeast, overturning a couple of irrigation pivots before crossing railroad tracks. It intensified as it crossed US 64, snapping several utility poles and producing significant tree damage. Additional tree damage was observed along AR 184, with damage becoming more sporadic as the tornado lifted.						
EF1	SE of Tyronza to NW of Birdsong	Poinsett	AR	35.4561°N 90.3233°W	07:24–07:28	2.6 mi (4.2 km)	150 yd (140 m)
EF1	A brief tornado touched down just west of I-555, crossing the highway and knocking multiple train boxcars off their bases along the BNSF Thayer South Subdivision. The box car bases remained on the tracks. The tornado continued northeast, damaging multiple power poles before lifting.						
EF0	Driver to Western Osceola	Mississippi	AR	35.6094°N 90.0155°W	07:52–08:01	7.56 mi (12.17 km)	150 yd (140 m)
EF0	This high-end EF0 tornado developed on US 61 in Driver, where it caused minor damage to the roof of a home. The tornado moved almost due north, downing utility poles and doing tree damage before entering Osceola, doing minor damage to fences and trees in the western portion of town before lifting.						
EF0	NNE of Fulton	Lauderdale	TN	35.6634°N 89.8526°W	08:06–08:07	0.95 mi (1.53 km)	50 yd (46 m)
EF0	A brief tornado touched down on the eastern shore of the Mississippi River, causing sporadic tree damage, with further analysis aided by high-resolution satellite data due to flooding and inaccessibility.						
EF0	SW of Cherry to NW of Glimp	Lauderdale	TN	35.6483°N 89.7353°W	08:11–08:21	6.41 mi (10.32 km)	100 yd (91 m)
EF0	A weak tornado formed near the Hatchie River, moving northeast and causing tree damage as it passed through Cherry, where a barn was damaged, trees were uprooted, and a church had its doors blown out. The tornado continued, causing more tree damage before dissipating in a wooded area.						
EF1	W of Ripley	Lauderdale	TN	35.7109°N 89.5991°W	08:22–08:26	3.03 mi (4.88 km)	100 yd (91 m)
EF1	Scattered tree damage occurred.						
EF1	NE of Ripley to E of Gates	Lauderdale	TN	35.7856°N 89.4567°W	08:35–08:43	5.32 mi (8.56 km)	150 yd (140 m)
EF1	Multiple barns and outbuildings had roof damage, a home lost its siding, and numerous trees were uprooted or snapped.						
EF0	SW of Gates	Lauderdale	TN	35.7758°N 89.453°W	08:35–08:38	2.3 mi (3.7 km)	50 yd (46 m)
EF0	A brief, weak tornado produced minor damage to a home. Sporadic tree damage was observed as the tornado moved north-northeast, crossing a path of the previous tornado before lifting.						
EF1	Southeastern Friendship	Crockett	TN	35.8802°N 89.2509°W	08:49–08:56	2.56 mi (4.12 km)	75 yd (69 m)
EF1	One tree was uprooted, and several others were damaged.						
EF0	SW of Big Sandy	Henry	TN	36.1725°N 88.2048°W	10:16–10:20	1.96 mi (3.15 km)	100 yd (91 m)
EF0	Multiple trees were uprooted, and roof damage occurred to several homes and barns.						
EF1	NNE of Big Sandy	Benton	TN	36.3069°N 88.0134°W	10:37–10:43	2.62 mi (4.22 km)	350 yd (320 m)
EF1	A tornado touched down, causing a tree to snap in half and another to be uprooted. It continued to damage trees along a road before moving northeast, crossing a small cove of the Tennessee River. The tornado intensified over the cove and made landfall, where it uprooted and blew over dozens of trees. The tornado lifted just before reaching the Tennessee River again.						
EF2	E of Fulton to NW of Hope	Hempstead	AR	33.6255°N 93.7618°W	14:36–14:50	10.43 mi (16.79 km)	500 yd (460 m)
EF2	This low-end EF2 tornado first touched down just north of I-30 and quickly moved east-northeast. The tornado's most intense damage occurred where widespread tree damage was observed with peak winds of 115 mph (185 km/h). Significant tree damage continued through the intersection of I-30 and US 278, where the tornado reached its maximum width. After this point, the tornado began weakening and gradually decreased in size, with the last damage observed being minor tree damage on the north side of Hope. Along its path, the tornado caused substantial damage to hardwood and softwood trees, with some outbuildings and carports also affected. A recreational vehicle was rolled, and a mobile home was pushed off its foundation.						
EF1	NNW of Lobelville	Humphreys	TN	35.8799°N 87.8227°W	20:49–20:51	2.63 mi (4.23 km)	150 yd (140 m)
EF1	A tornado began near I-40, snapping and uprooting numerous trees. The tornado then impacted a farmer's market, causing some damage there before dissipating in a heavily wooded area.						
EF0	Dickson	Dickson	TN	36.0576°N 87.3831°W	21:15–21:16	0.35 mi (0.56 km)	50 yd (46 m)
EF0	Several structures sustained roof and siding damage.						
EF1	NNE of Schlater to S of Philipp	Leflore, Tallahatchie	MS	33.6829°N 90.3167°W	21:49–22:00	7.31 mi (11.76 km)	700 yd (640 m)
EF1	This high-end EF1 tornado began north of Schlater, damaging several utility poles before crossing the Tallahatchie River into Sunnyside. It destroyed a mobile home and continued across the river again, back into Leflore County where it snapped a utility pole and damaged several sheds. A couple of homes also sustained roof damage, and an irrigation pivot was overturned. As the tornado turned eastward, it crossed the Little Tallahatchie River, snapping and uprooting numerous trees before lifting shortly after.						
EF1	SSW of Philipp to SSE of Cascilla	Tallahatchie, Grenada	MS	33.7407°N 90.2119°W	22:00–22:14	14.54 mi (23.40 km)	100 yd (91 m)
EF1	A tornado moved east-northeastward through the Tallahatchie National Wildlife Refuge, crossing into western Grenada county and then crossing MS 8. The tornado continued across additional rural areas before crossing into southeastern Tallahatchie County. Along its path, several trees were uprooted, and some smaller trees were snapped. At least one structure was damaged when a tree fell on its roof before the tornado lifted.						
EF2	NW of Tula to Eastern New Albany to SSW of Dumas	Lafayette, Pontotoc, Union, Tippah	MS	34.2427°N 89.3711°W	23:12–00:11	39.71 mi (63.91 km)	600 yd (550 m)
EF2	This strong, long-tracked tornado formed between the communities of Cornish and Tula, initially producing minor tree damage. It quickly intensified as it crossed US 278 southeast of Lafayette Springs, snapping numerous power poles and trees and causing minor roof damage. This damage continued as the tornado crossed into northwest Pontotoc County where it caused significant damage to trees and utility poles northwest of Thaxton, especially along MS 336. As the tornado moved northeast toward Hurricane, it substantially damaged several farm outbuildings and removed part of a roof from a home. Additional tree and utility pole damage was noted along MS 346 and MS 355. The tornado then moved over forested bottomland around Mud Creek, crossing into Union County near Flatwood. Trees and a few homes and outbuildings sustained damage as well as in the Bald Hill and Fairview areas. The tornado weakened as it crossed MS 15, with damage becoming more sporadic. The circulation was still relatively weak as it crossed I-22 southeast of New Albany, but it did overturn a semi-truck. Minor damage to homes, trees, and utility poles was observed on the eastern side of New Albany from MS 348 to MS 30. Mostly tree damage was observed as the tornado moved northeast through Kewonville, though a few homes had minor roof damage. After crossing into Tippah County, the tornado snapped large branches off a tree before lifting.						
EF1	S of New Harmony to ESE of Blue Springs	Union	MS	34.3779°N 88.9227°W	00:29–00:34	4.09 mi (6.58 km)	300 yd (270 m)
EF1	A brief tornado formed just west of a Toyota plant near New Harmony, where tree damage was noted along a local road. Several homes sustained minor roof damage, with one home having a couple of windows blown out. Several outbuildings were destroyed or heavily damaged, and trees were uprooted or snapped. The tornado weakened as it crossed I-22, causing additional but more sporadic damage to trees and power lines before dissipating.						
EF0	SE of Biggersville to NW of Glen	Alcorn	MS	34.8247°N 88.5418°W	00:40–00:50	6.53 mi (10.51 km)	150 yd (140 m)
EF0	Sporadic tree damage occurred.						
EF1	Northern Saltillo	Lee	MS	34.3803°N 88.7395°W	01:53–02:01	4.39 mi (7.07 km)	550 yd (500 m)
EF1	This high-end EF1 tornado caused multiple trees to be uprooted before continuing eastward, with additional trees snapped and uprooted along its path. The tornado then crossed US 45, causing widespread tree damage and minor damage to a few single-family homes in a nearby neighborhood. Further northeast, sporadic tree damage was observed along MS 145 before the tornado lifted shortly after this point.						
EF1	NW of Dennis	Tishomingo	MS	34.5635°N 88.2614°W	02:40–02:45	3.12 mi (5.02 km)	75 yd (69 m)
EF1	Multiple trees were damaged.						
EF1	SE of Pride to Sheffield	Colbert	AL	34.7188°N 87.8127°W	03:18–03:30	8.43 mi (13.57 km)	275 yd (251 m)
EF1	A tornado began just southeast of Pride, causing significant tree damage and minor roof damage to a small farm building. As it continued eastward across Little Bear Creek, it caused widespread tree damage and structural damage to homes from fallen trees. The tornado moved through Sheffield, where additional tree damage was observed before lifting just west of US 43.						
EF1	Tuscumbia to Ford City to NW of Rogersville	Colbert, Lauderdale	AL	34.7099°N 87.7779°W	03:25–03:57	28.76 mi (46.28 km)	280 yd (260 m)
EF1	This "twin" tornado, originating from the same parent circulation as the Sheffield tornado, touched down just south of US 72 and tracked through Tuscumbia and Muscle Shoals. The tornado caused significant tree damage, including uprooted trees and snapped hardwood trunks, with wind speeds at high-end EF1 intensity. It caused widespread damage in a trailer park where large trees fell on residential units, resulting in five injuries. As it continued northward, the tornado passed through Ford City, crossing Wilson Lake, and caused more tree damage as it entered Lauderdale County. The tornado continued uprooting trees and snapping large limbs, affecting neighborhoods and damaging homes and fences as it moved through the south side of Elgin. The tornado weakened as it crossed US 72 Second Creek and eventually lifted just south of Toonersville. This was the second of three tornadoes to strike Elgin in 2025, as well as the second tornado to strike Tuscambia and Muscle Shoals this year.						
EF1	Center Star to Elgin to WNW of Rogersville	Lauderdale	AL	34.8572°N 87.4601°W	03:45–03:53	5.76 mi (9.27 km)	85 yd (78 m)
EF1	A "twin" tornado developed to the north of the previous tornado. Numerous hardwood trees were uprooted, and a farm shed sustained roof damage. More uprooted trees were observed east of Bluewater Creek, extending through the intersection of SR 101 and US 72. Damage after the intersection became sparse until the tornado lifted near Pine Haven Shores. This was the third of three tornadoes to strike Elgin in 2025.						

=== April 6 event ===
List of confirmed tornadoes – Sunday, April 6, 2025
EF#	Location	County / parish	State	Start coord.	Time (UTC)	Path length	Max. width
EF1	Cowan to SE of Sewanee	Franklin	TN	35.1673°N 86.0169°W	05:38–05:52	8.71 mi (14.02 km)	350 yd (320 m)
EF1	A tornado touched down in Cowan, causing several trees to be uprooted and split. As it moved east, sporadic tree damage was observed with the tornado peaking in intensity along a lane where several large hardwood trees were uprooted and a shelter's roof was damaged by a falling tree. The tornado continued southeast, crossing roads and causing more tree damage, including trees snapped in various directions. It eventually lifted after uprooting additional trees near a ridgeline.						
EF1	Northern Monteagle to Tracy City	Grundy	TN	35.2484°N 85.8481°W	05:51–06:02	6.38 mi (10.27 km)	400 yd (370 m)
EF1	This tornado began over northern Monteagle, causing initial damage to trees and structures as it moved eastward. It strengthened as it reached Tracy City where significant tree damage occurred and some structural damage was noted. A baseball field in Tracy City had the metal roofing for its stands completely blown off with debris scattered across the park. Several homes experienced roof damage from fallen trees and some farm outbuildings were either collapsed or had their roofs blown off. The tornado then lifted on the southside of town.						
EF1	W of Langston	Marshall, Jackson	AL	34.5336°N 86.1605°W	06:33–06:39	1.08 mi (1.74 km)	175 yd (160 m)
EF1	This tornado developed over a cove on Guntersville Lake, initially causing significant tree damage with many trees snapped or uprooted along the shore. The tornado then destroyed a boat-slip house while also damaging nearby homes. Moving inland, the tornado continued to uproot trees, though the damage was more sporadic as it encountered elevation changes. It downed only a few trees and branches as it weakened before lifting over the lake.						
EF1	SSE of Lake to WNW of Newton	Newton	MS	32.2715°N 89.29°W	07:26–07:38	7.47 mi (12.02 km)	150 yd (140 m)
EF1	A tornado touched down, snapping trees as it moved north-northeast. It continued across a farm, damaging chicken houses and a metal farm building. The tornado tracked towards US 80 and I-20 where it caused sporadic tree damage, uprooting a mix of softwood and hardwood trees. The tornado dissipated shortly after crossing the two highways.						
EF1	ESE of New Hebron	Jefferson Davis	MS	31.7194°N 89.9582°W	07:51–07:52	1.37 mi (2.20 km)	300 yd (270 m)
EF1	This brief tornado touched down north of a road and caused damage to trees and vegetation. It continued northeastward, passing through Hebron and downing numerous trees along its path. Minor structural damage, including gutter damage and light damage to outbuildings, was noted before the tornado lifted.						
EF2	WSW of De Kalb	Kemper	MS	32.7478°N 88.8286°W	08:35–08:37	1.86 mi (2.99 km)	300 yd (270 m)
EF2	This tornado began in the Cleveland community, tracking east-northeastward. It crossed MS 16, causing multiple barns to be demolished or heavily damaged and snapping or uprooting several trees. Several box trucks and tractors were turned on their sides and a home sustained minor damage. The tornado also caused significant damage to a home, including removing a large portion of the roof and causing part of the outer walls to collapse before dissipating.						
EF2	W of Raleigh	Smith	MS	32.0519°N 89.5828°W	08:57–09:07	3.54 mi (5.70 km)	500 yd (460 m)
EF2	A strong tornado caused minor tree damage and snapped both hardwood and softwood trees as it touched down. It then moved north, snapping and uprooting trees in a concentrated area as it intensified. It caused significant damage to several homes, including a brick home where the roof was removed, windows were blown out, and an RV was thrown through a metal outbuilding. A second home also sustained roof damage and another RV was thrown into a porch, causing it to collapse. The tornado weakened as it approached MS 18, leaving only minor tree damage before dissipating shortly after crossing the highway.						
EF2	WNW of Soso to Stringer to E of Bay Springs	Jones, Smith, Jasper	MS	31.7969°N 89.3493°W	09:43–10:10	15.22 mi (24.49 km)	200 yd (180 m)
EF2	1 death – This strong tornado began near Summerland, uprooting trees along MS 28, and then moved northeast across rural areas of Smith county. It crossed into Jasper county, where it initially caused roof damage, primarily removing shingles. The tornado fluctuated between EF0 and EF1 intensity with more tree damage reported along its path. Upon an abrupt leftward turn, it intensified to EF2 strength near a community southwest of Stringer, where a mobile home was knocked off its blocks and slid several feet while another was completely destroyed and launched onto two parked vehicles, killing its occupant. The tornado then continued northeast, severely damaging a two-story brick house by removing the roof and knocking down the back wall. It moved on, weakening as it passed through the Lake Como area and dissipated shortly after crossing MS 528.						
EF0	SE of Soso	Jones	MS	31.7169°N 89.2732°W	10:13–10:21	4.56 mi (7.34 km)	50 yd (46 m)
EF0	A high-end EF0 tornado touched down south of MS 29 where it downed trees and limbs as it moved northeast. The tornado caused light damage to trees and vegetation along its path. The most significant damage occurred near the tornado's endpoint where a large farm outbuilding had its west-facing anchors pulled from the ground and was flipped over before the tornado dissipated.						
EF2	Northern Glendale to N of Petal	Forrest	MS	31.3729°N 89.33°W	10:57–11:06	6.45 mi (10.38 km)	400 yd (370 m)
EF2	This strong tornado touched down east of I-59, causing tree damage and knocking over a billboard sign. It continued northeast, uprooting trees and causing shingle damage to roofs in several areas. After crossing the Leaf River, the tornado reached low-end EF2 intensity, causing significant roof damage to two homes and overturning two RVs. The tornado also snapped and uprooted numerous trees. After crossing US 11, it damaged a mobile home and a large construction building. The tornado continued northeast, damaging more trees before dissipating.						
EF1	Energy	Clarke	MS	32.1829°N 88.5482°W	11:42–11:43	0.87 mi (1.40 km)	150 yd (140 m)
EF1	A brief tornado touched down in the community of Energy, damaging a shed near the intersection of MS 514 and a county road. As the tornado moved northeast along MS 514, tree damage became more concentrated and a metal outbuilding sustained roof damage. The tornado continued to uproot several trees and damaged another shed before dissipating.						
EF2	E of Increase, MS to N of Yantley, AL	Lauderdale (MS), Choctaw (AL)	MS, AL	32.2362°N 88.4771°W	11:54–12:02	5.27 mi (8.48 km)	800 yd (730 m)
EF2	A strong tornado initially caused minor tree damage with broken branches and uprooted softwood trees. It intensified as it moved north, causing significant damage by snapping numerous trees. Several homes experienced roof damage with more than a fifth of their roofing material lost. The tornado took an easterly turn near MS 19, weakening but continuing to cause tree damage. It crossed the state line at MS 19/SR 10, continuing its path in Alabama and causing further tree damage before dissipating.						
EF1	Pine Hill	Wilcox	AL	31.9814°N 87.5911°W	13:58–13:59	0.51 mi (0.82 km)	75 yd (69 m)
EF1	This tornado touched down in Pine Hill where a few trees were uprooted in a weak convergent pattern. It then continued east, causing weak tree damage before intensifying as it crossed SR 5. Upon crossing the highway, several large softwood pines were snapped and minor damage was observed to a home as the tornado dissipated.						
EF1	Northern Pine Hill	Wilcox	AL	31.992°N 87.5792°W	13:59–14:04	1.22 mi (1.96 km)	150 yd (140 m)
EF1	A high-end EF1 tornado began in the woods behind an intersection, causing damage to large hardwood limbs and uprooting small trees. An unattached awning from a gas station was lofted and thrown about 50 yards (46 m) into a tree. After crossing SR 5, the tornado caused roof damage to a restaurant and continued producing tree damage, including uprooted and snapped hardwood trees. Upon crossing SR 10, additional tree damage occurred. The most significant damage took place as the tornado crossed an area where numerous large hardwood and softwood trees were uprooted and snapped. A single-wide manufactured home was rolled, though it was not properly secured. The tornado likely continued northeast into the woods, where survey crews were unable to assess further damage.						
EF1	NE of Sardis	Dallas	AL	32.2907°N 86.9572°W	15:13–15:15	1.32 mi (2.12 km)	400 yd (370 m)
EF1	Two buildings suffered minor roof damage and several trees were snapped or uprooted.						
EF0	W of Big Point to S of Hurley	Jackson	MS	30.59°N 88.53°W	19:43–19:47	2.73 mi (4.39 km)	25 yd (23 m)
EF0	A weak tornado caused minor and patchy tree damage. It produced high snaps, large broken branches, and a few uprooted trees, with the strongest damage occurring right after it touched down. Additional scattered damage was observed in tree tops, but as the tornado weakened, only small branches and debris were left in its path. The tornado ultimately dissipated near a park area.						
EF1	Northeastern Columbus	Muscogee	GA	32.5445°N 84.8633°W	19:56–20:00	2.62 mi (4.22 km)	350 yd (320 m)
EF1	A tornado touched down just northeast of downtown Columbus, initially impacting the Beaver Run neighborhood. Numerous trees were snapped or uprooted with a few homes sustaining tree damage. The tornado continued northeast, crossing the Bull Creek Golf Course, where it caused widespread tree damage. The tornado continued along US 27, causing additional tree damage before weakening and dissipating soon thereafter.						
EF1	WNW of Huber to N of Dry Branch	Twiggs, Bibb	GA	32.7426°N 83.5861°W	21:45–22:03	9.19 mi (14.79 km)	450 yd (410 m)
EF1	A tornado developed in the Bond Swamp National Wildlife Refuge and moved into northern Twiggs county, beginning near the Bibb-Twiggs county line. The tornado caused significant tree damage, including snapped and uprooted trees along US 23, bringing down powerlines. It continued northeast, impacting areas near the broadcast towers and I-16, causing more tree damage. The tornado continued causing widespread tree damage before crossing US 80. It continued through an unpopulated area with tree farms, with weak damage being observed. The tornado weakened as it moved northeast with only minor tree damage noted before dissipating.						
EF0	SE of Perote	Barbour	AL	31.9009°N 85.6234°W	03:21–03:23	0.48 mi (0.77 km)	50 yd (46 m)
EF0	A very brief tornado touched down within Star Hill, causing some tree damage.						

=== April 7 event ===
List of confirmed tornadoes – Monday, April 7, 2025
EF#	Location	County / parish	State	Start coord.	Time (UTC)	Path length	Max. width
EF0	ENE of Hilton to WSW of Blakely	Early	GA	31.295°N 85.0439°W	10:46–10:56	7.41 mi (11.93 km)	50 yd (46 m)
EF0	An elementary school had minor damage and a few pine trees were snapped.						
EF1	E of Haralson to NW of Experiment	Coweta, Fayette, Spalding	GA	33.2279°N 84.524°W	11:22–11:38	13.89 mi (22.35 km)	250 yd (230 m)
EF1	A tornado began in southeastern Coweta County where it snapped trees near a house and outbuilding. The tornado continued east-northeast into Spalding County, crossing several roads and uprooting and snapping trees, some of which fell onto homes. The tornado briefly crossed into Fayette County before crossing back into Spalding County, intensifying as it continued uprooting and snapping more trees. The tornado then weakened as it crossed a couple of roads, causing sporadic tree damage before lifting.						
EF0	S of Sunny Side to WNW of Towalaga	Spalding	GA	33.3213°N 84.3113°W	11:38–11:44	4.28 mi (6.89 km)	100 yd (91 m)
EF0	This weak tornado initially snapped a few trees along its path before crossing US 19. It then downed several trees, including one of which fell onto a home. The tornado continued into a mostly wooded and inaccessible area, snapping trees as it crossed additional roads. As it approached Cole Reservoir, the tornado weakened before dissipating.						
EF0	Northern Locust Grove	Henry	GA	33.373°N 84.1571°W	11:48–11:50	1.62 mi (2.61 km)	75 yd (69 m)
EF0	A weak tornado touched down, snapping trees along its path. It crossed I-75, causing additional tree damage and tossing construction barrels onto the highway. The tornado lifted before reaching US 23.						
EF1	NE of Cairo to NW of Ochlocknee	Grady, Thomas	GA	30.9525°N 84.1645°W	15:02–15:11	4.56 mi (7.34 km)	200 yd (180 m)
EF1	This high-end EF1 tornado touched down in a wooded area just west of SR 111 in northeastern Grady county, causing some initial damage to structures and trees. It intensified as it moved east, producing concentrated damage near a road intersection where a single-wide mobile home was completely destroyed. The tornado lifted the mobile home’s support frame out of the ground and caused damage to other homes in the area. It continued to cause significant tree damage, snapping pine and oak trees and damaging several residences along its path. The tornado weakened as it crossed into Thomas county with the last damage occurring near smaller pine trees as it dissipated.						
EF1	N of Chastain	Colquitt	GA	31.0986°N 83.9551°W	15:27–15:30	0.85 mi (1.37 km)	150 yd (140 m)
EF1	A tornado began in a wooded area, snapping and uprooting large pines, some of which fell on a home and outbuilding. It continued northeast, causing roof shingle loss and minor damage to a storage shed at another residence. After crossing SR 202, the tornado weakened but still caused occasional damage to pine trees, eventually toppling an irrigation pivot system as it lifted.						
EF1	SSE of Bloxham to SW of Ochlockonee	Leon	FL	30.3381°N 84.6045°W	15:27–15:49	12.17 mi (19.59 km)	200 yd (180 m)
EF1	A tornado touched down in the Apalachicola National Forest, causing minor tree damage and roof damage in a neighborhood as it tracked northeast. It crossed SR 267, continuing to uproot trees and damage branches along its path. The tornado dissipated near SR 20. Many of the damage points in the forest were inaccessible by vehicle but were estimated using radar data.						
EF1	N of Bradfordville, FL to SSE of Beachton, GA	Leon (FL), Grady (GA)	FL, GA	30.6099°N 84.2323°W	16:16–16:27	8.6 mi (13.8 km)	150 yd (140 m)
EF1	This tornado touched down in the Killearn Lakes neighborhood where it snapped and uprooted several trees, some of which fell on homes. It continued northeast, causing additional damage to homes and trees. As it moved northeast, it crossed over Lake Iamonia and then US 319, snapping and uprooting pine trees along the way. The tornado continued through the area, crossing more roads before lifting over a private plantation just over the Georgia state line.						
EF0	Waycross	Ware	GA	31.2136°N 82.3461°W	23:03–23:08	1.72 mi (2.77 km)	20 yd (18 m)
EF0	A high-end EF0 tornado began in Waycross where it caused damage by snapping softwood trees and large branches that fell on homes. As it moved northeast, it damaged roofs, gutters, and siding on homes along several streets. It also uprooted hardwood trees and damaged fences along other streets. The tornado caused partial roof damage in the northeastern part of the area and dissipated shortly thereafter.						

=== April 10 event ===
List of confirmed tornadoes – Thursday, April 10, 2025
EF#	Location	County / parish	State	Start coord.	Time (UTC)	Path length	Max. width
EF1	Princeton	Gibson	IN	38.3695°N 87.5689°W	20:49–20:52	1.18 mi (1.90 km)	125 yd (114 m)
EF1	This tornado touched down by Princeton Community High School, damaging its roof before moving southeastward through northeastern Princeton, causing considerable tree damage and downing power lines throughout town. An outbuilding was collapsed and an electrical pole broken. Several structures in town suffered roof damage as well.						

=== April 17 event ===
List of confirmed tornadoes – Thursday, April 17, 2025
EF#	Location	County / parish	State	Start coord.	Time (UTC)	Path length	Max. width
EF3	ENE of Bennington to Nashville to ESE of Fort Calhoun	Douglas, Washington	NE	41.3886°N 96.0906°W	23:55–00:15	8.12 mi (13.07 km)	170 yd (160 m)
EF3	An intense tornado touched down near N-133, initially causing tree damage by snapping limbs. It moved eastward, continuing to damage trees and homes, including the destruction of a garage. The tornado caused significant tree damage along Little Papillion Creek and impacted a home and large garage with the most intense damage observed at a well-built all-brick home which was destroyed, leaving only some walls still standing. A nearby large garage was completely destroyed as well. The tornado continued due east, destroying another large shed and removing the roof from a brick home. It then caused significant damage between two homes, destroyed a large garage, lifted and moved a pickup truck approximately 30 yards (27 m), and threw large trees nearly 0.25 miles (0.40 km) downstream. The tornado weakened slightly as it caused more tree damage and destroyed several outbuildings. It then continued to the northeast, snapping more trees, flipping recreational vehicles, and damaging outbuildings and another home before dissipating in a field.						
EF0	NE of Alvo	Cass	NE	40.8826°N 96.3728°W	00:14–00:16	0.84 mi (1.35 km)	50 yd (46 m)
EF0	This weak tornado was recorded inflicting minimal damage to trees.						
EFU	SW of Murdock	Cass	NE	40.8946°N 96.3249°W	00:20–00:22	1.31 mi (2.11 km)	10 yd (9.1 m)
EFU	A brief tornado remained over open fields.						
EF0	W of Manley	Cass	NE	40.9119°N 96.2155°W	00:36–00:41	2.23 mi (3.59 km)	75 yd (69 m)
EF0	An intermittent tornado caused damage to a few groupings of trees.						
EF0	SW of Tabor to SW of Randolph	Fremont	IA	40.8636°N 95.7144°W	01:13–01:28	5.47 mi (8.80 km)	440 yd (400 m)
EF0	A dusty, high-end EF0 tornado inflicted weak damage to roofs and farm outbuildings, flipped irrigation pivots, and damaged trees.						
EF1	SE of Randolph to Nyman	Fremont, Page	IA	40.8523°N 95.5391°W	01:32–02:08	19.01 mi (30.59 km)	1,971 yd (1,802 m)
EF1	A very large, high-end EF1 tornado initially snapped tree limbs around Lake Shawtee. As it moved east, the tornado continued to damage trees and affect small outdoor farm buildings and house roofs. The most significant damage occurred south of Imogene, where wooden power poles were snapped, homes sustained minor damage, and several outdoor buildings and trees were damaged. The tornado continued east, prompting the issuance of a tornado emergency for Essex. It passed just barely north of the town, causing more damage to wooden power poles and farm buildings as it began turning northeastward. The tornado then moved through Nyman, where trees and outdoor buildings were damaged along with snapped wooden power poles, before lifting just northeast of town.						
EF1	S of Kent	Union	IA	40.9145°N 94.4485°W	03:21–03:28	4.27 mi (6.87 km)	50 yd (46 m)
EF1	Four farmsteads had damage occur to outbuildings or shingles on homes.						

=== April 18 event ===
List of confirmed tornadoes – Friday, April 18, 2025
EF#	Location	County / parish	State	Start coord.	Time (UTC)	Path length	Max. width
EF0	N of Cedar City	Iron	UT	37.73°N 113.07°W	18:15–18:20	0.1 mi (0.16 km)	5 yd (4.6 m)
EF0	A landspout occurred just west of I-15.						
EF0	E of Mentor	Greene	MO	37.1057°N 93.179°W	03:15–03:16	0.22 mi (0.35 km)	50 yd (46 m)
EF0	A brief tornado broke some tree branches and damaged a few outbuildings.						

=== April 19 event ===
List of confirmed tornadoes – Saturday, April 19, 2025
EF#	Location	County / parish	State	Start coord.	Time (UTC)	Path length	Max. width
EF0	N of St. Libory	St. Clair	IL	38.3919°N 89.7245°W	06:54–06:55	0.45 mi (0.72 km)	25 yd (23 m)
EF0	A two-door garage suffered significant damage with debris being strewn a couple hundred yards downstream.						
EFU	SSW of Sterling City	Tom Green, Sterling	TX	31.55°N 101.09°W	21:00–21:08	2.04 mi (3.28 km)	200 yd (180 m)
EFU	A trained spotter observed a tornado.						
EFU	NE of Water Valley	Tom Green	TX	31.68°N 100.72°W	21:55–21:56	0.15 mi (0.24 km)	25 yd (23 m)
EFU	A storm chaser reported a brief tornado.						
EF0	SE of Jacksboro	Jack	TX	33.18°N 98.1234°W	23:11–23:15	1.84 mi (2.96 km)	300 yd (270 m)
EF0	This tornado began in open pasture south of US 281 and moved northeast, impacting two manufactured homes with light roofing and siding damage. It crossed US 281, damaging a commercial building and another manufactured home. The tornado continued northeast over open pasture, crossing US 380 before dissipating.						
EF0	ENE of Jacksboro	Jack	TX	33.2588°N 98.0505°W	23:24–23:25	0.64 mi (1.03 km)	200 yd (180 m)
EF0	A tornado developed just west of an intersection and quickly impacted a power substation, causing a power outage in parts of Jack county. As it moved northeast, the tornado caused scattered tree damage. Near the end of the tornado's path, an abandoned frame home sustained roof and window damage along with significant tree damage.						
EF1	W of Cundiff	Jack	TX	33.3055°N 98.0524°W	23:31–23:34	2.52 mi (4.06 km)	250 yd (230 m)
EF1	This tornado formed and moved northeast, paralleling FM 1810 for about two miles, causing significant tree damage. Multiple outbuildings were also affected, with roof damage reported. At least three residences sustained roof damage and an RV trailer at one of the homes was flipped over and completely destroyed.						
EF0	WNW of Chico	Jack, Wise	TX	33.3544°N 97.9294°W	23:38–23:43	2.07 mi (3.33 km)	100 yd (91 m)
EF0	Scattered tree damage occurred.						
EF0	S of Bowie	Montague	TX	33.4761°N 97.8714°W	23:55–00:03	4.75 mi (7.64 km)	250 yd (230 m)
EF0	A tornado formed along the eastern shore of Lake Amon G. Carter and caused numerous trees to be damaged in the neighborhood surrounding the Bowie Country Club. A few homes sustained minor roof damage and some fencing and outbuildings were also impacted. Moving northeast, the tornado damaged horse barns and other outbuildings near FM 1125. After crossing the road, it produced sporadic wind damage. The tornado was observed crossing US 81 before dissipating just east of it.						
EF2	WSW of Rubottom	Love	OK	33.916°N 97.542°W	01:19–01:30	1.3 mi (2.1 km)	300 yd (270 m)
EF2	A house suffered significant roof and exterior wall damage, a church had its roof damaged, and trees and power lines were damaged.						
EF1	NE of Clairette to N of Duffau	Erath	TX	32.0588°N 98.0752°W	01:20–01:30	6.77 mi (10.90 km)	50 yd (46 m)
EF1	A high-end EF1 began northeast of Clairette and moved northeast, causing damage to several trees and outbuildings. It continued, snapping and uprooting trees and damaging more outbuildings. As the tornado moved farther northeast, a home experienced roof and siding damage along with additional tree and outbuilding damage. More homes and trees were damaged, with a large dairy farm also affected. The worst damage occurred at one home that lost much of its roof and siding. A mobile home was also completely destroyed, with debris scattered up to 700 yards (640 m). The tornado then weakened and the final damage was noted as tree damage in Johnsville before it dissipated.						
EFU	NNE of Rubottom	Love	OK	34.029°N 97.421°W	01:44–01:45	0.7 mi (1.1 km)	25 yd (23 m)
EFU	Multiple storm spotters and a local fire department observed a tornado but no damage could be found.						
EF0	NE of Bowie	Montague	TX	33.6092°N 97.8053°W	01:45–01:47	0.28 mi (0.45 km)	125 yd (114 m)
EF0	An outbuilding had its roof damage and a home had a large tree branch fall on it, damaging its roof.						
EF2	SE of Bluff Dale to N of Tolar	Hood	TX	32.2977°N 97.9718°W	01:55–02:26	13.61 mi (21.90 km)	250 yd (230 m)
EF2	This strong tornado touched down near the Hood/Erath County line. It caused severe damage to a 125-year-old farm house, blowing it off its foundation, snapping dozens of large trees, and destroying an outbuilding. The tornado then moved north-northeast, breaking large tree branches along the way and crossing US 377, where it tore off the roof of a side barn and a house, scattering metal roofing up to half a mile away. As it continued, it heavily damaged a mobile home, several RVs, and additional outbuildings while downing more trees. The tornado weakened as it moved through fields, causing sporadic tree damage before lifting.						
EF1	Northern Grape Creek	Tom Green	TX	31.6035°N 100.5464°W	02:29–02:31	0.18 mi (0.29 km)	100 yd (91 m)
EF1	This tornado caused extensive tree damage, uprooting at least two trees. It also blew off roof shingles from a house and uplifted metal roofing panels from a small outbuilding. A metal carport was moved approximately 15 feet (4.6 m), a dumpster was blown over, and a trailer was pushed a few feet off its parked location.						
EFU	SSE of Dougherty	Murray	OK	34.341°N 97.017°W	02:42	0.5 mi (0.80 km)	100 yd (91 m)
EFU	A storm chaser took a photo of a tornado west of US 177 in inaccessible areas within the Arbuckle Mountains.						
EF0	SW of Weatherford to Greenwood	Parker	TX	32.688°N 97.8654°W	03:01–03:10	4.08 mi (6.57 km)	25 yd (23 m)
EF0	A small, weak tornado touched down southwest of Weatherford and moved northward, causing large tree branches to fall and flipping an outbuilding. As it moved through the area, it continued to down a few trees and tree branches. The tornado caused minor damage to a home and barn and impacted several locations north of I-20 with more tree damage observed along various rural roads. The tornado lifted in Greenwood after causing localized damage to trees and structures.						
EF1	Ada	Pontotoc	OK	34.786°N 96.686°W	03:03–03:11	4.3 mi (6.9 km)	100 yd (91 m)
EF1	Several homes had their roofs and awnings damaged. Multiple businesses at a shopping center were also damaged. One person was injured.						
EFU	N of Mill Creek	Johnston	OK	34.4868°N 96.82°W	03:10–03:11	0.5 mi (0.80 km)	60 yd (55 m)
EFU	Storm spotters observed a tornado that caused no damage.						
EF1	SE of Byng	Pontotoc	OK	34.831°N 96.636°W	03:10–03:11	0.4 mi (0.64 km)	30 yd (27 m)
EF1	A barn was damaged and a home had its windows blown in.						
EF1	NW of Weatherford to SE of Peaster	Parker	TX	32.7944°N 97.8505°W	03:16–03:22	3.53 mi (5.68 km)	250 yd (230 m)
EF1	This high-end EF1 tornado touched down near the Lake Mineral Wells State Trailway and moved north-northeast, causing extensive tree damage including uprooted trees and snapped trunks. It caused significant roof damage to a home when winds lifted part of the ceiling and minor damage to two other homes. The tornado continued to uproot more trees and damage outbuildings along its path, including a small complex of duplexes, where half the roofs of three buildings were torn off. As the tornado moved northeast, it caused minor damage to homes and trees in residential areas, dissipating north of its last impact area.						
EF1	Spaulding	Hughes	OK	35.004°N 96.45°W	03:33–03:37	2.1 mi (3.4 km)	150 yd (140 m)
EF1	1 death – A high-end EF1 tornado caused major damage to a manufactured home. Several other homes had their roofs, windows, and exterior walls damaged as well. One person was injured.						
EF1	SE of Lebanon to S of Madill	Marshall	OK	33.935°N 96.874°W	03:34–03:50	10 mi (16 km)	500 yd (460 m)
EF1	A few homes suffered roof damage along the path and many trees and power poles were damaged.						
EF1	SE of Millsap	Parker	TX	32.6966°N 98.0047°W	03:39–03:46	4.37 mi (7.03 km)	110 yd (100 m)
EF1	A high-end EF1 tornado initially caused minor damage to a home along with uprooting many trees on the property. As the tornado moved north, it damaged another home, carports, sheds, barns, and additional trees. The tornado then tracked northeast, causing relatively minor damage along the west side of a residential area. However, it caused roof damage to a home and significant tree damage on another property. The tornado continued for another two miles, with broken tree limbs and other tree damage before ending.						
EF2	ESE of Madill to WNW of Little City	Marshall	OK	34.079°N 96.707°W	03:56–04:01	3 mi (4.8 km)	50 yd (46 m)
EF2	This brief, but strong high-end EF2 tornado significantly damaging a house.						
EF1	NE of Garner to NW of Peaster	Parker	TX	32.8536°N 97.9382°W	04:01–04:10	4.34 mi (6.98 km)	200 yd (180 m)
EF1	A tornado began southeast of Authon and moved northeast, impacting homes, sheds, and barns along the way. The tornado's intensity peaked in Adell, where notable tree damage was observed. The tornado continued northeast, causing minor damage to trees and outbuildings before dissipating.						
EF1	Bee to S of Coleman	Johnston	OK	34.128°N 96.574°W	04:06–04:26	12 mi (19 km)	300 yd (270 m)
EF1	Two homes suffered roof damage, a couple of outbuildings were damaged and multiple trees were damaged.						
EF0	NW of Tushka to W of Atoka	Atoka	OK	34.35°N 96.251°W	04:42–04:46	3.3 mi (5.3 km)	300 yd (270 m)
EF0	A church had roof and steeple damage and a at least four barns were damaged. Several trees were damaged as well.						
EF1	ESE of Lehigh	Coal	OK	34.43°N 96.152°W	04:54–04:55	0.5 mi (0.80 km)	30 yd (27 m)
EF1	The roof of a home was damaged, a shed destroyed and numerous trees were damaged.						

=== April 20 event ===
List of confirmed tornadoes – Sunday, April 20, 2025
EF#	Location	County / parish	State	Start coord.	Time (UTC)	Path length	Max. width
EF0	W of Marietta	Love	OK	33.94°N 97.145°W	06:24	0.5 mi (0.80 km)	30 yd (27 m)
EF0	Some tree damage occurred.						
EF2	W of Guthrie	Callaway	MO	38.7374°N 92.1157°W	18:31–18:36	2.61 mi (4.20 km)	100 yd (91 m)
EF2	This strong tornado partially unroofed and collapsed part of a house and snapped trees. Other homes and trees suffered minor damage.						
EF1	Northern Galena, KS to Carl Junction, MO to SE of Nashville, MO	Cherokee (KS), Jasper (MO)	KS, MO	37.06°N 94.69°W	18:57–19:22	24.07 mi (38.74 km)	250 yd (230 m)
EF1	This tornado touched down east of Riverton before moving through northern Galena. Hundreds of trees were downed in Kansas and multiple homes had their roofs damaged in Galena. The tornado then entered Missouri, striking Klondike where trees and a mobile home were damaged. The tornado continued northeast into Carl Junction, damaging solar panels and the roofs of buildings in town. It continued over mostly rural country before dissipating.						
EF0	SW of Esrom to Lamar to NNE of Milford	Barton	MO	37.39°N 94.37°W	19:29–19:50	19.75 mi (31.78 km)	300 yd (270 m)
EF0	This weak tornado damaged approximately two hundred homes and businesses in Lamar. Elsewhere, the tornado damaged multiple outbuildings. Many trees were damaged along the path as well.						
EF1	Northwestern Fayetteville	Washington	AR	36.089°N 94.243°W	19:41–19:44	3 mi (4.8 km)	250 yd (230 m)
EF1	This tornado caused significant roof damage and broken windows to several homes in the very northwestern edge of Fayetteville. Several trees were uprooted and large tree limbs were snapped.						
EFU	SSW of Box Elder	Chouteau	MT	48.2505°N 110.0626°W	21:00–21:08	1.11 mi (1.79 km)	
EFU	A landspout was observed over open land.						
EF0	SE of Garrison	Christian	MO	36.82°N 93.01°W	21:21–21:23	1.3 mi (2.1 km)	50 yd (46 m)
EF0	Large tree limbs were downed and minor siding and shingle damage occurred to a home.						
EF0	ESE of Florence	Morgan	MO	38.56°N 92.88°W	21:30–21:32	0.69 mi (1.11 km)	75 yd (69 m)
EF0	A turkey and chicken farm had multiple barn roofs damaged and several large tree limbs were broken.						
EF0	S of Arden to SSW of Granada	Douglas	MO	36.97°N 92.81°W	21:35–21:42	2.76 mi (4.44 km)	50 yd (46 m)
EF0	Several trees were damaged, some of which were uprooted. A few homes and cars were damaged from tree limbs that were downed.						
EF0	WNW of Duncan	Webster	MO	37.3077°N 92.7783°W	21:46–21:48	1.14 mi (1.83 km)	30 yd (27 m)
EF0	Several barns were damaged along with several trees and limbs downed.						
EF0	SSW of Hartville	Wright	MO	37.18°N 92.55°W	21:59–22:01	1.77 mi (2.85 km)	50 yd (46 m)
EF0	Numerous trees were damaged, a few of which were uprooted. One tree had a large branch snapped which fell onto a home, significantly damaging the home's roof.						
EF1	ENE of Hartville to NW of Dawson	Wright	MO	37.27°N 92.38°W	22:08–22:13	2.07 mi (3.33 km)	400 yd (370 m)
EF1	A tornado touched down near Route 38, moving intermittently across fields. The tornado caused trees to fall in a convergent pattern as it crossed the state route and moved through the Dove Creek bottoms. It is unclear if the tornado continued further into a wooded area west of Rayborn.						
EF1	Northern Columbia	Boone	MO	38.9855°N 92.3252°W	22:18–22:22	3.31 mi (5.33 km)	100 yd (91 m)
EF1	A tornado touched down in Northern Columbia, producing tree damage as it moved east past Albert Oakland Park. It then turned northeast, crossed US 63, and continued causing tree damage before dissipating.						
EF1	NE of Hot Springs Village to SSE of Perryville	Saline, Perry	AR	34.7685°N 92.8661°W	22:23–22:33	7.73 mi (12.44 km)	350 yd (320 m)
EF1	Significant tree damage occurred on the far eastern side of the Ouachita National Forest.						
EF1	Northeastern Columbia	Boone	MO	39.0097°N 92.2564°W	22:33–22:35	2.31 mi (3.72 km)	100 yd (91 m)
EF1	A brief tornado touched down east of Hinkson Creek, completely destroying the Columbia Recycling Facility and severely damaging the machinery inside. It continued northeast, causing additional tree damage before dissipating.						
EF1	ESE of Molino	Audrain	MO	39.2898°N 91.8183°W	22:56–22:57	0.32 mi (0.51 km)	50 yd (46 m)
EF1	A brief tornado destroyed two outbuildings and rolled two small grain bins.						
EF0	NNE of Hartshorn to SW of Akers	Shannon	MO	37.3163°N 91.6428°W	23:01–23:03	1.47 mi (2.37 km)	250 yd (230 m)
EF0	Numerous trees were uprooted and large branches snapped.						
EF0	NE of Spencerburg	Pike	MO	39.4364°N 91.3588°W	23:19–23:20	0.34 mi (0.55 km)	25 yd (23 m)
EF0	An outbuilding and a few trees were significantly damaged.						
EF0	N of Fall Creek to Payson	Adams	IL	39.791°N 91.311°W	23:48–23:52	4.18 mi (6.73 km)	25 yd (23 m)
EF0	Mostly tree damage occurred with some minor damage being done to bleachers as well.						
EF1	SSE of Vilonia to NNW of Ward	Pulaski, Faulkner, Lonoke, White	AR	34.984°N 92.1948°W	23:55–00:13	14.07 mi (22.64 km)	500 yd (460 m)
EF1	Numerous trees were snapped or uprooted, some of which fell onto and severely damaged buildings.						
EF0	Northern Camp Point to SE of La Prairie	Adams	IL	40.0496°N 91.0777°W	00:04–00:10	8.17 mi (13.15 km)	100 yd (91 m)
EF0	This high-end EF0 tornado touched down, destroying an outbuilding. It moved northeast through Bailey Park, causing roof damage to another outbuilding, then continued past Golden and damaged the roofs of multiple outbuildings before dissipating.						
EF1	S of Blandinsville to NW of Sciota	McDonough	IL	40.52°N 90.88°W	00:37–00:44	7.01 mi (11.28 km)	150 yd (140 m)
EF1	Multiple trees were damaged, with some of them being snapped. Large tree limbs were also downed and two power poles were snapped.						
EF0	N of New Boston to SW of Mannon	Mercer	IL	41.2°N 91°W	00:45–00:47	0.86 mi (1.38 km)	25 yd (23 m)
EF0	A small outbuilding was damaged and a large tree was uprooted.						
EF1	NNE of Sciota	McDonough	IL	40.57°N 90.74°W	00:47–00:50	2.96 mi (4.76 km)	100 yd (91 m)
EF1	A farm outbuilding was completely destroyed, a couple of power poles were snapped, and tree damage was noted as well.						
EF0	Swan Creek to NNE of Youngstown	Warren	IL	40.67°N 90.66°W	00:57–01:01	3.99 mi (6.42 km)	25 yd (23 m)
EF0	A garage was damaged.						
EF1	SE of Madonnaville to Southern Waterloo	Monroe	IL	38.2534°N 90.2182°W	01:00–01:07	7.33 mi (11.80 km)	100 yd (91 m)
EF1	This tornado touched down near Madonnaville, causing minor damage to a home and an outbuilding before overturning another outbuilding and damaging trees. Additional tree damage and minor roof damage to outbuildings occurred as it tracked between Wartburg and Burksville. In southern Waterloo, it caused minor roof damage to a greenhouse at Waterloo High School, then turned east and caused significant power pole damage along IL 156. The tornado dissipated shortly afterward.						
EF1	SE of Columbia	Monroe	IL	38.4166°N 90.1536°W	01:13–01:14	0.35 mi (0.56 km)	100 yd (91 m)
EF1	An outbuilding was overturned and tree damage occurred.						
EF0	SE of Millstadt	St. Clair	IL	38.4161°N 90.0543°W	01:14–01:15	0.75 mi (1.21 km)	100 yd (91 m)
EF0	This weak tornado destroyed an outbuilding and produced tree damage.						
EF1	ENE of Preston to SW of Houston	Randolph	IL	38.1257°N 89.8443°W	01:25–01:26	1.32 mi (2.12 km)	75 yd (69 m)
EF1	The roof of a grain silo was removed and several trees were snapped or uprooted.						
EF0	NNE of Windsor to WNW of Opheim	Mercer, Henry	IL	41.23°N 90.44°W	01:35–01:38	2.2 mi (3.5 km)	75 yd (69 m)
EF0	A high-end EF0 tornado caused damage to farm outbuildings and trees.						
EF1	WSW of Victoria to Eastern Galva to W of Kewanee	Knox, Henry	IL	41.0295°N 90.121°W	01:39–01:57	16.5 mi (26.6 km)	150 yd (140 m)
EF1	This tornado initially snapped four power poles along IL 167. It continued damaging outbuildings and snapping numerous trees upon entering Galva. The tornado snapped several more trees in Galva. After exiting town, it struck and damaged an outbuilding before lifting.						
EF1	NNE of Altona to WSW of Bishop Hill	Knox, Henry	IL	41.1325°N 90.1507°W	01:41–01:48	4.4 mi (7.1 km)	120 yd (110 m)
EF1	A tornado destroyed a hog farm building, tossing it into another outbuilding in extreme northern Knox county. The tornado then entered Henry county where it destroyed two large grain bins and scattered the debris nearly a mile northeast. The tornado then snapped a tree and a power pole along US 34 before damaging an outbuilding and dissipating.						
EF1	S of Tremont to N of Deer Creek	Tazewell	IL	40.4928°N 89.495°W	01:49–02:05	14.5 mi (23.3 km)	100 yd (91 m)
EF1	A grain bin lost its top and an outbuilding lost much of its metal roof. Numerous trees and powerlines were damaged throughout the path as well.						
EFU	NE of Orion	Henry	IL	41.4°N 90.31°W	01:54–01:55	0.28 mi (0.45 km)	10 yd (9.1 m)
EFU	A field had some scouring and corn debris was noted.						
EF0	W of Kewanee	Henry	IL	41.239°N 89.994°W	01:57–01:58	0.21 mi (0.34 km)	50 yd (46 m)
EF0	The door of an outbuilding was damaged and some tree branches were broken.						
EF1	WNW of Kewanee to S of Atkinson	Henry	IL	41.29°N 90.04°W	01:58–02:05	7.28 mi (11.72 km)	25 yd (23 m)
EF1	Multiple farmsteads had significant tree damage. One of the farmsteads also had an outbuilding destroyed.						
EF0	E of Colona to W of Geneseo	Henry	IL	41.46°N 90.26°W	01:58–02:00	1.14 mi (1.83 km)	50 yd (46 m)
EF0	This brief tornado damaged trees.						
EF1	W of Geneseo	Henry	IL	41.41°N 90.23°W	01:58–02:08	7.21 mi (11.60 km)	100 yd (91 m)
EF1	Small branches on trees were damaged.						
EF0	Eastern Cordova	Rock Island	IL	41.68°N 90.31°W	02:12–02:15	0.69 mi (1.11 km)	50 yd (46 m)
EF0	Several trees were snapped in and around the Cordova Cemetery. An outdoor swing set and a large center pivot irrigation system were damaged.						
EF1	NE of Yorktown	Bureau, Whiteside	IL	41.57°N 89.82°W	02:25–02:28	1.03 mi (1.66 km)	50 yd (46 m)
EF1	One power pole was snapped and three others were downed. Tree damage occurred as well.						
EF1	WNW of Murphysboro	Jackson	IL	37.805°N 89.3968°W	02:42–02:45	1.78 mi (2.86 km)	25 yd (23 m)
EF1	Several barns, trees, and roofs were damaged.						

=== April 21 event ===
List of confirmed tornadoes – Monday, April 21, 2025
EF#	Location	County / parish	State	Start coord.	Time (UTC)	Path length	Max. width
EFU	SW of Floweree	Cascade	MT	47.6733°N 111.1456°W	21:43–21:45	2.91 mi (4.68 km)	
EFU	A landspout was photographed and remained over open farmland.						

=== April 22 event ===
List of confirmed tornadoes – Tuesday, April 22, 2025
EF#	Location	County / parish	State	Start coord.	Time (UTC)	Path length	Max. width
EFU	SE of Fort Stockton	Pecos	TX	30.83°N 102.84°W	22:08–22:12		
EFU	A storm chaser reported a landspout crossing a road.						
EFU	NNE of Fort Stockton	Pecos	TX	31.06°N 102.81°W	22:26–22:30		
EFU	This landspout was observed by a storm chaser as it remained in an open field.						

=== April 23 event ===
List of confirmed tornadoes – Wednesday, April 23, 2025
EF#	Location	County / parish	State	Start coord.	Time (UTC)	Path length	Max. width
EFU	NNW of Firstview	Cheyenne	CO	38.9184°N 102.5936°W	00:34–00:35	0.02 mi (0.032 km)	100 yd (91 m)
EFU	A storm spotter reported a landspout over open country.						

=== April 24 event ===
List of confirmed tornadoes – Thursday, April 24, 2025
EF#	Location	County / parish	State	Start coord.	Time (UTC)	Path length	Max. width
EF1	NNE of Elizabeth	Elbert	CO	39.39°N 104.60°W	21:01–21:06	2.05 mi (3.30 km)	20 yd (18 m)
EF1	An EF1 tornado was confirmed by NWS Boulder. Preliminary information.						
EFU	W of Freedom	Woodward	OK	36.782°N 99.234°W	23:21	0.3 mi (0.48 km)	30 yd (27 m)
EFU	Storm chasers for local TV networks observed a tornado over the salt flats of the Cimarron River.						
EFU	NW of Freedom	Woods	OK	36.791°N 99.267°W	23:44	0.3 mi (0.48 km)	30 yd (27 m)
EFU	Storm chasers observed a tornado that remained over open land around the Cimarron River.						
EFU	ESE of Cap Rock to W of Kalgary	Crosby	TX	33.4629°N 101.3101°W	00:01–00:15	3.37 mi (5.42 km)	440 yd (400 m)
EFU	A tornado occurred over open land.						
EFU	NNW of South Plains	Floyd, Briscoe	TX	34.305°N 101.3649°W	00:10–00:16	4.23 mi (6.81 km)	20 yd (18 m)
EFU	Multiple storm chasers observed an anticyclonic tornado that remained over open country.						
EFU	SW of Flomot NE of Dougherty	Floyd, Motley	TX	34.1329°N 101.1188°W	00:10–00:38	9.64 mi (15.51 km)	30 yd (27 m)
EFU	Several storm chasers and members of the public observed a strong tornado that caused damage to vegetation.						
EFU	NNE of Cap Rock	Crosby	TX	33.5334°N 101.3955°W	00:34–00:37	1.48 mi (2.38 km)	30 yd (27 m)
EFU	Law enforcement officers observed a brief tornado.						
EFU	WNW of Roaring Springs	Motley	TX	33.927°N 100.9184°W	01:01–01:06	1.85 mi (2.98 km)	30 yd (27 m)
EFU	A law enforcement officer observed a tornado over open land.						
EFU	SW of Kalgary	Garza	TX	33.3403°N 101.2145°W	01:48–01:51	1.16 mi (1.87 km)	30 yd (27 m)
EFU	A tornado was reported that remained over open country.						
EF1	NW of Miami	Roberts	TX	35.7908°N 100.7943°W	02:05–02:41	11.26 mi (18.12 km)	200 yd (180 m)
EF1	This long-lived, high-end EF1 tornado touched down in central Roberts county, initially growing quickly into a cone and stovepipe shape. The highest concentration of damage occurred near the intersection of FM 283 and FM 2699, where a center pivot was overturned and twisted. The tornado continued southeast, crossing FM 283 multiple times, downing power poles, twisting fences, and bending traffic signs. It passed just north of Miami without impacting the town and dissipated before crossing US 60 with little additional damage.						
EFU	S of Kalgary (1st tornado)	Garza	TX	33.2598°N 101.1546°W	02:08–02:14	2.02 mi (3.25 km)	30 yd (27 m)
EFU	A tornado remained over open land.						
EFU	SSW of Kalgary (2nd tornado)	Garza	TX	33.3156°N 101.1905°W	02:24–02:30	1.84 mi (2.96 km)	30 yd (27 m)
EFU	This tornado tracked across rural land, causing no damage.						
EFU	S of Kalgary (3rd tornado)	Garza	TX	33.2423°N 101.1444°W	02:24–02:32	1.78 mi (2.86 km)	30 yd (27 m)
EFU	No damage occurred as this tornado tracked through open country.						
EFU	S of Kalgary (4th tornado)	Garza	TX	33.2579°N 101.1621°W	02:50–02:55	1.75 mi (2.82 km)	30 yd (27 m)
EFU	A tornado was observed remaining over rural land.						

=== April 25 event ===
List of confirmed tornadoes – Friday, April 25, 2025
EF#	Location	County / parish	State	Start coord.	Time (UTC)	Path length	Max. width
EFU	NE of Bula	Bailey, Lamb	TX	33.9461°N 102.6467°W	20:56–21:24	4.29 mi (6.90 km)	300 yd (270 m)
EFU	A large, dusty and slow-moving tornado was observed by numerous storm chasers and Texas Tech University research radars. The tornado caused no known damage but radar estimates this was likely a strong tornado.						
EFU	NE of Blytheville	Mississippi	AR	35.98°N 89.82°W	22:01–22:03		
EFU	A brief landspout occurred in an open field.						
EF0	N of Greenville	Darke	OH	40.1371°N 84.6159°W	23:32	0.08 mi (0.13 km)	25 yd (23 m)
EF0	A building sustained minor damage to siding and a roof overhang.						
EFU	NW of Summerfield	Deaf Smith	TX	34.8502°N 102.6701°W	03:32–03:40	1.11 mi (1.79 km)	25 yd (23 m)
EFU	This tornado was observed by a local fire department as it remained over open fields.						
EF1	N of Summerfield	Deaf Smith	TX	34.8229°N 102.5284°W	04:08–04:13	0.59 mi (0.95 km)	50 yd (46 m)
EF1	A tornado touched down near FM 1058, causing minor roofing damage and snapping a few trees. As it moved northwest, it crossed FM 1058, breaking a couple of power poles. As it continued along its path, it deposited debris and partially overturned an irrigation pivot before dissipating.						
EF1	Northern Canyon	Randall	TX	34.9985°N 101.934°W	04:32–04:37	0.88 mi (1.42 km)	100 yd (91 m)
EF1	This high-end EF1 tornado touched down, bringing down tree limbs. As it crossed a major road, it caused roof and fencing damage to homes and a church. It continued through a subdivision where several homes sustained roof and fencing damage. One home experienced significant damage due to a camper being thrown onto it. The tornado then moved southwest, causing additional tree and roof damage to homes before lifting in a field behind a residence.						
EF0	N of Canyon	Randall	TX	35.0699°N 101.9277°W	05:08–05:09	0.16 mi (0.26 km)	25 yd (23 m)
EF0	Minor tree damage occurred and a trampoline was tossed into a neighboring yard.						

=== April 26 event ===
List of confirmed tornadoes – Saturday, April 26, 2025
EF#	Location	County / parish	State	Start coord.	Time (UTC)	Path length	Max. width
EFU	SE of Springlake to WNW of Hart	Lamb, Castro	TX	34.1659°N 102.2658°W	07:28–07:44	17.14 mi (27.58 km)	440 yd (400 m)
EFU	A wedge tornado was photographed over open land. No known damage occurred but radar estimates this was a strong tornado according to the NWS in Lubbock.						
EFU	NNE of Bokchito	Bryan	OK	34.045°N 96.143°W	19:30–19:44	3 mi (4.8 km)	30 yd (27 m)
EFU	A storm chaser recorded a tornado.						
EFU	S of Fort Sumner	De Baca	NM	34.309°N 104.2391°W	23:35–23:42	0.42 mi (0.68 km)	50 yd (46 m)
EFU	Two storm chasers observed a tornado over open land.						
EFU	NNE of Roswell	Chaves	NM	33.5957°N 104.3222°W	00:00–00:10	0.79 mi (1.27 km)	100 yd (91 m)
EFU	Multiple storm chasers observed an intermittent tornado that remained over open country.						

=== April 27 event ===
List of confirmed tornadoes – Sunday, April 27, 2025
EF#	Location	County / parish	State	Start coord.	Time (UTC)	Path length	Max. width
EFU	WSW of Bingham	Garden	NE	41.9656°N 102.166°W	23:38–23:50	2.06 mi (3.32 km)	10 yd (9.1 m)
EFU	A tornado was recorded over open land.						
EFU	WSW of Bingham	Garden	NE	41.94°N 102.18°W	23:44	0.1 mi (0.16 km)	10 yd (9.1 m)
EFU	A brief anticyclonic tornado occurred simultaneously with the previous tornado.						
EF2	SW of Bingham to NNE of Ashby	Garden, Grant, Sheridan, Cherry	NE	41.9775°N 102.0917°W	23:56–01:10	18.96 mi (30.51 km)	2,200 yd (2,000 m)
EF2	This very large, high-end EF2 wedge tornado struck a farmstead and derailed a coal train on the BNSF Sand Hills Subdivision near Bingham. It also damaged power poles and trees along N-2. It continued slowly moving northeast over open land as it moved across southwestern Cherry County. It was the widest tornado ever surveyed by the National Weather Service forecast office in North Platte.						
EFU	N of Hyannis	Cherry	NE	42.1598°N 101.8016°W	01:04–01:10	1.24 mi (2.00 km)	10 yd (9.1 m)
EFU	A tornado was witnessed over open hills.						
EFU	N of Whitman	Cherry	NE	42.2651°N 101.5206°W	01:12–01:27	5.45 mi (8.77 km)	10 yd (9.1 m)
EFU	This tornado was confirmed via high-resolution satellite data. No damage was available to be assessed.						
EFU	NE of Hyannis	Cherry	NE	42.141°N 101.648°W	01:42	0.01 mi (0.016 km)	10 yd (9.1 m)
EFU	A tornado was observed as it remained in rural lands. No damage occurred.						
EFU	NNE of Whitman	Cherry	NE	42.25°N 101.44°W	01:50	0.01 mi (0.016 km)	10 yd (9.1 m)
EFU	This tornado was photographed as it remained over open hills.						
EFU	WSW of Kennedy	Cherry	NE	42.4206°N 101.2228°W	02:53–03:10	4.88 mi (7.85 km)	10 yd (9.1 m)
EFU	A tornado was confirmed based on radar data. No known damage occurred.						
EF1	WSW of Kennedy	Cherry	NE	42.4581°N 101.1576°W	03:17–03:25	6.58 mi (10.59 km)	10 yd (9.1 m)
EF1	This tornado crossed through shelterbelts, damaging trees.						
EF2	W of Kennedy	Cherry	NE	42.5298°N 101.0807°W	03:27–03:45	11.44 mi (18.41 km)	880 yd (800 m)
EF2	Several large trees were snapped.						
EF2	NW of Kennedy	Cherry	NE	42.64°N 100.93°W	03:27	0.01 mi (0.016 km)	100 yd (91 m)
EF2	This brief but strong tornado significantly damaged multiple pine trees, including tossing dead pine trees a large distance in the southern portion of the Samuel R. McKelvie National Forest. This was a satellite tornado to the previous event.						

=== April 28 event ===
List of confirmed tornadoes – Monday, April 28, 2025
EF#	Location	County / parish	State	Start coord.	Time (UTC)	Path length	Max. width
EF1	SE of Spring Creek to St. Francis to Rosebud	Todd	SD	43.1°N 100.99°W	05:31–05:48	13.75 mi (22.13 km)	255 yd (233 m)
EF1	A tornado touched down and moved across open fields, destroying an outbuilding and throwing its contents up to 50 yards (46 m). As it crossed a state highway, the tornado intensified, demolishing a mobile home and throwing its contents up to 100 yards (91 m). The tornado continued across open land before encountering trees and power poles. It then caused significant tree damage in St. Francis, including snapped trunks near the town church. It also damaged the roof of a community center and an elderly living facility. The tornado weakened as it moved north-northeast and caused roof damage to a water supply center and adjacent storage facility in Rosebud before dissipating. Six people were injured.						
EF0	N of Mission	Todd	SD	43.38°N 100.65°W	05:56–05:57	0.05 mi (0.080 km)	40 yd (37 m)
EF0	A mobile home lost all of its roof and its north facing wall while a house suffered major roof damage with most of the contents from the home thrown back to the west. Other outbuildings on the property suffered minor damage.						
EFU	NE of Worthington to SW of Brewster	Nobles	MN	43.6792°N 95.531°W	19:40–19:42	1.49 mi (2.40 km)	10 yd (9.1 m)
EFU	A landspout occurred in an open field.						
EF0	E of Morristown	Rice	MN	44.2231°N 93.3894°W	22:38–22:39	0.42 mi (0.68 km)	40 yd (37 m)
EF0	This brief tornado damaged a group of trees and removed the roof and a few wall panels of an outbuilding.						
EF1	E of Ruskin to S of Epsom	Rice	MN	44.2542°N 93.119°W	22:52–22:55	3.26 mi (5.25 km)	125 yd (114 m)
EF1	A metal building system was severely damaged; the anchors holding its walls in place failed which caused them to collapse. Several truck trailers were heavily damaged, multiple small outbuildings were damaged, and several trees were snapped.						
EF0	Belvue to NW of St. Marys	Pottawatomie	KS	39.22°N 96.17°W	23:37–23:45	3.57 mi (5.75 km)	50 yd (46 m)
EF0	Minor damage occurred to trees and outbuildings.						
EF1	Northeastern Mondovi	Buffalo, Eau Claire	WI	44.58°N 91.63°W	00:32–00:39	5.56 mi (8.95 km)	500 yd (460 m)
EF1	This tornado damaged roofs and windows at houses on the northeast side of Mondovi near a golf course and uprooted trees just northeast of the town. As it tracked northeast into Eau Claire county, the tornado snapped trees and large branches before dissipating.						
EF1	S of Cleghorn to WSW of Allen	Eau Claire	WI	44.6448°N 91.4326°W	00:44–00:47	2.05 mi (3.30 km)	100 yd (91 m)
EF1	A pole barn was destroyed and trees were snapped or uprooted.						
EF0	S of Hale Corner	Eau Claire	WI	44.6535°N 91.2794°W	00:55–00:56	0.79 mi (1.27 km)	50 yd (46 m)
EF0	Large tree branches were broken.						
EF0	S of Bridge Creek	Eau Claire	WI	44.6414°N 91.0873°W	01:07–01:08	0.79 mi (1.27 km)	25 yd (23 m)
EF0	A barn lost a portion of its roof and multiple trees were snapped.						
EF1	E of Bridge Creek	Eau Claire	WI	44.6672°N 90.9883°W	01:13–01:15	1.35 mi (2.17 km)	75 yd (69 m)
EF1	A few homes lost some shingles from their roofs, an outbuilding lost a part of its roof, and several hundred trees were snapped.						
EF0	E of Birnamwood	Shawano	WI	44.9225°N 89.1186°W	03:00–03:02	1.88 mi (3.03 km)	55 yd (50 m)
EF0	Trees were uprooted and the roof an outbuilding was damaged.						
EF0	Mattoon to ESE of Phlox	Shawano, Menominee	WI	44.9922°N 89.0816°W	03:02–03:10	6.21 mi (9.99 km)	65 yd (59 m)
EF0	A tornado produced damage to some buildings and uprooted trees.						

=== April 29 event ===
List of confirmed tornadoes – Tuesday, April 29, 2025
EF#	Location	County / parish	State	Start coord.	Time (UTC)	Path length	Max. width
EF1	Northern Owasso	Tulsa	OK	36.332°N 95.872°W	12:05–12:09	2.4 mi (3.9 km)	300 yd (270 m)
EF1	Several homes had their roofs damaged, multiple outbuildings were damaged, and a few trees were uprooted with their branches snapped.						
EF1	Grove	Delaware	OK	36.583°N 94.845°W	12:55–13:06	8.7 mi (14.0 km)	1,000 yd (910 m)
EF1	A tornado developed east of Monkey Island on Grand Lake o' the Cherokees and moved northeast, causing tree damage and snapping large tree limbs. As it approached US 59, more trees were uprooted. The tornado then widened, damaging the roof of a metal building and uprooting more trees. It continued to widen near Grove Municipal Airport where outbuildings and homes were damaged. Trees were snapped or uprooted as the tornado passed north of the airport and eventually dissipated after crossing SH-10.						
EF1	N of Jay to NE of Sycamore	Delaware	OK	36.466°N 94.801°W	13:02–13:10	7.9 mi (12.7 km)	1,000 yd (910 m)
EF1	Several homes and outbuildings were extensively damaged. Numerous trees were snapped or uprooted.						
EF1	Southern Cayuga	Delaware	OK	36.601°N 94.693°W	13:07–13:09	2.3 mi (3.7 km)	450 yd (410 m)
EF1	Large tree limbs were snapped and a few trees were uprooted.						
EF1	Gravette to N of Centerton	Benton	AR	36.433°N 94.507°W	13:20–13:33	11 mi (18 km)	1,000 yd (910 m)
EF1	A tornado began north of AR 72, uprooting trees and snapping large tree limbs. It moved east-southeast, causing additional tree damage and damaging roofs as it crossed through the north side of Gravette. The tornado uprooted more trees and snapped large branches, with trees falling on homes in a neighborhood. It continued to cause tree damage as it crossed multiple roads before dissipating. More tree damage observed near the end of its path.						
EF1	S of Freistatt to NW of Verona	Lawrence	MO	36.97°N 93.9°W	13:55–14:00	4.38 mi (7.05 km)	100 yd (91 m)
EF1	A tornado damaged the roofs of outbuildings, destroying a small one completely. A turkey barn and residence also had their roofs damaged. Trees were uprooted, large tree limbs and powerlines were downed, and tin was tossed downwind.						
EF1	Southern Aurora	Lawrence	MO	36.95°N 93.76°W	14:00–14:08	5.16 mi (8.30 km)	100 yd (91 m)
EF1	This tornado damaged the roof of a church, caused minor damage to several other structures, and uprooted many large trees.						
EF0	ESE of Marionville	Lawrence, Stone, Christian	MO	36.96°N 93.62°W	14:09–14:14	5.25 mi (8.45 km)	50 yd (46 m)
EF0	Multiple large trees were uprooted, some of which fell onto and damaged buildings.						
EF1	SE of Bois D'Arc	Greene	MO	37.21°N 93.48°W	14:24–14:25	1.55 mi (2.49 km)	50 yd (46 m)
EF1	The roof of a barn and an outbuilding were damaged. Many trees were uprooted, a few which fell onto a home.						
EF0	NNW of Nixa	Christian	MO	37.06°N 93.31°W	14:30–14:34	4.87 mi (7.84 km)	25 yd (23 m)
EF0	A high-end EF0 tornado partially removed the roof of an auto repair shop and collapsed one of its walls. The tornado then became intermittent before overturning a trailer and damaging the awning of a business before it lifted.						
EF0	SE of Boulder City to Wanda	Newton	MO	36.79°N 94.23°W	14:35–14:39	2.07 mi (3.33 km)	50 yd (46 m)
EF0	This weak tornado damaged and uprooted numerous trees. A couple of outbuildings were also damaged.						
EF0	NNE of Ebenezer to SW of Fair Grove	Greene	MO	37.38°N 93.27°W	14:40–14:45	8.37 mi (13.47 km)	100 yd (91 m)
EF0	Many trees were uprooted or split and many large tree limbs were snapped. A small residence and farm outbuilding were damaged as well.						
EF1	S of Potosi	Washington	MO	37.9004°N 90.839°W	17:24–17:30	4.24 mi (6.82 km)	150 yd (140 m)
EF1	A garage was destroyed and trees were damaged.						
EFU	NNW of Bakersfield	Pecos	TX	30.9627°N 102.3237°W	20:42–20:47	1 mi (1.6 km)	50 yd (46 m)
EFU	A storm chaser recorded a tornado over rural fields.						
EF2	SW of Vera to NE of Red Springs	Knox, Baylor	TX	33.629°N 99.57°W	23:22–23:47	11.75 mi (18.91 km)	1,000 yd (910 m)
EF2	This strong tornado began southwest of Vera, damaging numerous trees, toppling a crane, and breaking a wind turbine blade. Near US 82, it heavily damaged at least two metal buildings, destroyed an outbuilding with debris blown onto the highway, and caused roof damage to a home near the county line before crossing into Baylor County. There, it heavily damaged a metal building at a feed lot, damaged another wind turbine, destroyed two outbuildings, damaged a barn, and tossed ranch equipment. Tree damage occurred at multiple points along the path before the tornado dissipated northeast of Red Springs.						
EF3	N of Seymour	Baylor	TX	33.668°N 99.294°W	23:58–00:04	3.7 mi (6.0 km)	650 yd (590 m)
EF3	This strong, low-end EF3 tornado moved over the Seymour Airport where numerous hangars and outbuildings were destroyed. A number of planes and vehicles were heavily damaged or destroyed at the airport as well.						

=== April 30 event ===
List of confirmed tornadoes – Wednesday, April 30, 2025
EF#	Location	County / parish	State	Start coord.	Time (UTC)	Path length	Max. width
EF0	W of Celina	Denton, Collin	TX	33.3265°N 96.8368°W	14:37–14:38	0.09 mi (0.14 km)	25 yd (23 m)
EF0	Minor tree damage occurred.						
EF0	NW of Sumner	Lamar	TX	33.8134°N 95.7196°W	15:59–16:00	0.37 mi (0.60 km)	50 yd (46 m)
EF0	A brief tornado in caused roof and HVAC damage to one home, peeled off metal roofing and decking, and snapped nearby tree branches.						
EFU	N of Stigler	Haskell	OK	35.288°N 95.128°W	17:34	0.1 mi (0.16 km)	100 yd (91 m)
EFU	A storm chaser reported a brief tornado.						
EFU	NW of Mertens	Hill	TX	32.0651°N 96.9104°W	18:28	0.01 mi (0.016 km)	20 yd (18 m)
EFU	This brief tornado was recorded over an open field.						
EF0	ENE of Akins	Sequoyah	OK	35.51°N 94.658°W	18:55–18:56	0.3 mi (0.48 km)	150 yd (140 m)
EF0	A weak tornado snapped large tree limbs and damaged the roof of an outbuilding.						
EF1	Lockesburg	Sevier	AR	33.9668°N 94.1971°W	19:23–19:29	4.31 mi (6.94 km)	300 yd (270 m)
EF1	The tornado touched down south of AR 24 where it caused significant damage to a small shed. It then crossed the highway, snapping and uprooting trees, though a nearby home was spared from damage despite trees falling around it. A trampoline and small playground were blown 50 yards (46 m) to the west. As the tornado continued northeast, it caused significant damage to chicken coops and uprooted several trees. It then continued to inflict damage to trees before dissipating.						
EFU	WSW of Roundup	Hockley	TX	33.737°N 102.1923°W	20:33–20:36	1.31 mi (2.11 km)	30 yd (27 m)
EFU	Local broadcast media reported of a brief tornado that remained over open fields.						
EFU	SW of Shallowater	Lubbock	TX	33.63°N 102.049°W	21:03–21:04		
EFU	Broadcast media reported a brief landspout.						
EFU	N of Lubbock	Lubbock	TX	33.63°N 101.919°W	21:11–21:12		
EFU	A landspout was observed west of Lubbock International Airport.						
EF0	NE of Keyesport to SW of Shobonier	Fayette	IL	38.7828°N 89.1919°W	23:30–23:38	5.01 mi (8.06 km)	50 yd (46 m)
EF0	This tornado removed several shingles from a home and caused tree damage.						
EF2	SE of Shobonier to N of Augsburg	Fayette	IL	38.8451°N 89.0662°W	23:48–23:59	4.33 mi (6.97 km)	150 yd (140 m)
EF2	A strong tornado developed, damaging trees and structures at a farm. It moved northeast, impacting additional farms and reaching its maximum strength where it leveled an outbuilding. As it continued northeast, the tornado caused tree damage and minor structural damage before dissipating after crossing into a rural area north of Augsburg.						
EFU	N of Effingham to NNW of Teutopolis	Effingham	IL	39.1562°N 88.5324°W	01:14–01:16	1.73 mi (2.78 km)	30 yd (27 m)
EFU	A tornado was recorded. No known damage occurred.						
EFU	N of Janesville	Coles	IL	39.4011°N 88.2422°W	02:03–02:04	0.48 mi (0.77 km)	30 yd (27 m)
EFU	A tornado was recorded. No known damage occurred.						

== See also ==
- Tornadoes of 2025
- List of United States tornadoes from January to March 2025
- List of United States tornadoes in May 2025
