= Cap Rock, Texas =

- Unincorporated community
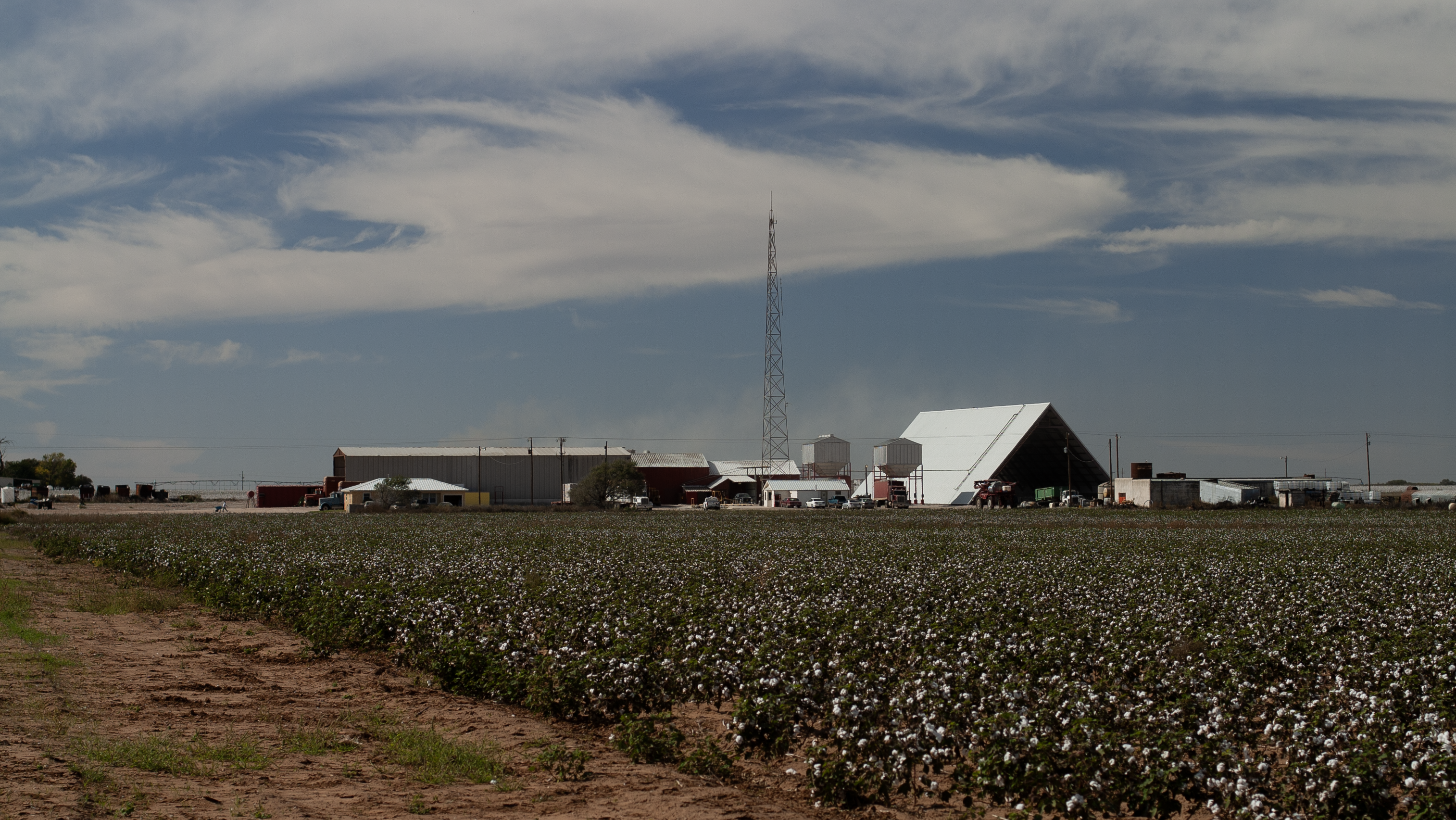
- Cotton gin in Cap Rock, Texas

- Location within Texas Location within the United States
- Coordinates: 33°29′29″N 101°23′54″W
- Country: United States
- State: Texas
- County: Crosby
- Elevation: 3,025 ft (922 m)
- Time zone: UTC-6 (Central (CST))
  - Summer (DST): UTC-5 (CDT)
- Area code: 806
- GNIS feature ID: 1353792

Cap Rock is an unincorporated community in Crosby County, Texas, United States. According to the Handbook of Texas, the community had a population of 25 in 2000. It is located within the Lubbock metropolitan area.

== History ==
The Cap Rock area was established in 1925.

== Geography ==
Cap Rock is located on Texas State Highway 207 at the edge of the Caprock on the Salt Fork Brazos River, 27 mi (43 km) east of Lubbock in Crosby County.
