= Caprock, Texas =

Region in the Panhandle of Texas

The Caprock
- Region
- Interactive map of The Caprock
- Coordinates: 34.4376°N 101.0669°W
- Country: United States of America
- State: Texas
- Time zone: UTC-6:00 (CST)
  - Summer (DST): UTC-5:00 (CDT)

The Caprock is a region in the Panhandle of Texas (USA). It is the land to the west of the Caprock Escarpment, which separates it from plains stretching to the east at a much lower elevation. The region overlaps Texas' portion of the Llano Estacado.
