= Bingham, Nebraska =

Unincorporated community in Sheridan County, Nebraska, United States

- Unincorporated community
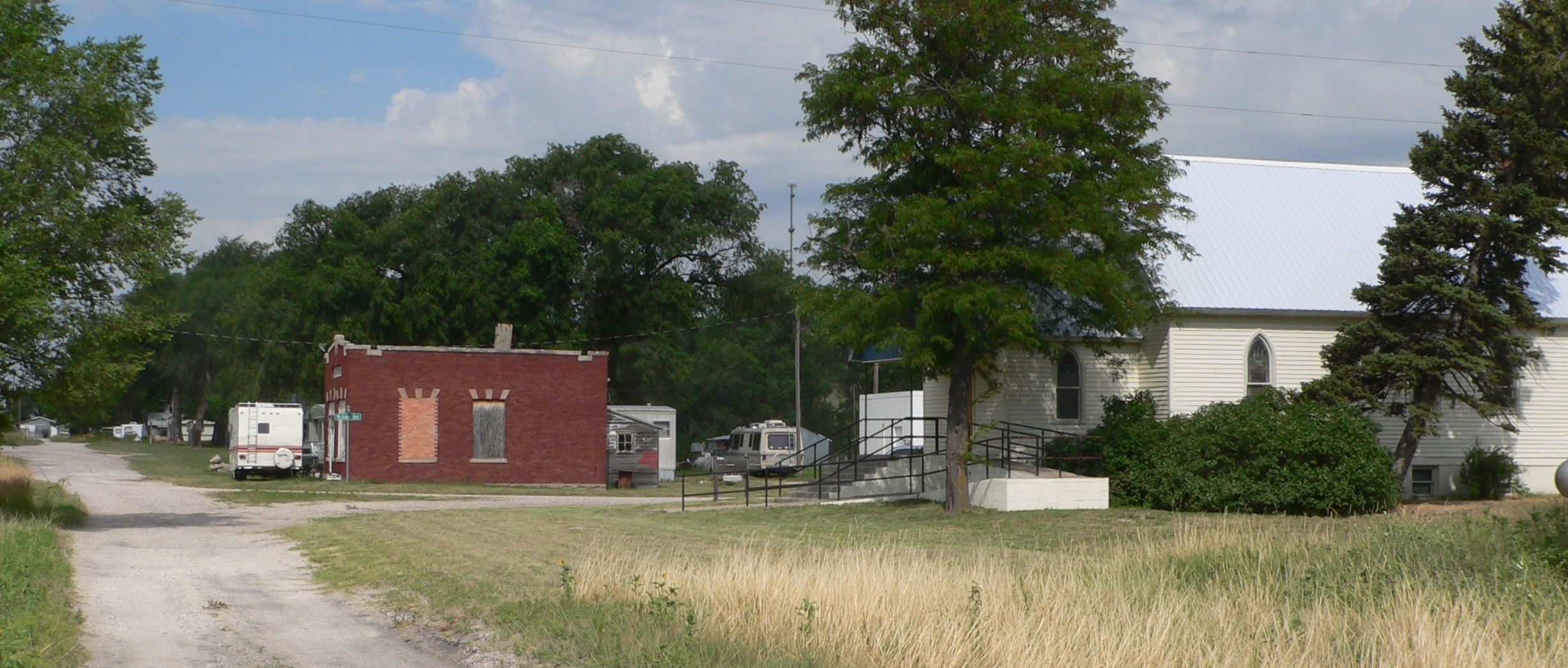
- First Street in Bingham, July 2010

- Location within the state of Nebraska Location within the United States
- Coordinates: 42°1′16″N 102°5′19″W
- Country: United States
- State: Nebraska
- County: Sheridan
- Elevation: 3,744 ft (1,141 m)
- Time zone: UTC-6 (Central (CST))
  - Summer (DST): UTC-5 (CDT)
- ZIP codes: 69335
- GNIS feature ID: 827448

Bingham is an unincorporated community in southeastern Sheridan County, Nebraska, United States. It lies along Nebraska Highway 2, south-southeast of the city of Rushville, the county seat of Sheridan County. Its elevation is 3,894 feet (1,187 m).

== History ==
The Bingham post office was established in 1888. The origin of the name Bingham is obscure. Two sources speculate it might be the name of a pioneer settler, railroad official or of a place in Minnesota.
