= Towalaga, Georgia =

Unincorporated community in Georgia, U.S.

Coordinates: 33°18′51″N 84°12′17″W

Towalaga is an unincorporated community in Spalding County, in the U.S. state of Georgia.

== History ==
A variant name is "Towaliga". The community derives its name from the Towaliga River.
