= Authon, Texas =

Unincorporated community in Texas, US

- Ghost town
- Location in Texas
- Coordinates: 30.5946426°N 95.6238341°W
- Country: United States
- State: Texas
- County: Walker
- Elevation: 1,020 ft (310 m)
- USGS Feature ID: 1381362

Authon is an unincorporated community in Walker County, Texas, United States. Situated on Farm to Market Road 113, the community was established in the late 1870s. Despite registering as Arthur, post office officials named the town Authon; the post office operated from 1882 to 1904. A primarily agricultural community, it peaked in the 1890s, with 75 residents. As of 2000, its population was 15, up from 5 in 1990.
