= Kennedy, Nebraska =

Unincorporated community in Nebraska, U.S.

Coordinates: 42°32′50″N 100°49′01″W

Kennedy is an unincorporated community in Cherry County, Nebraska, United States.

== History ==
A post office was established at Kennedy in 1886, and remained in operation until it was discontinued in 1969. The community was named for B. E. B. Kennedy of Omaha.
