= Shideler, Indiana =

Unincorporated community in Indiana, U.S.

Shideler
- Unincorporated community
- Location within Indiana
- Coordinates: 40°18′22″N 85°21′35″W
- Country: United States
- State: Indiana
- County: Delaware
- Township: Union Township
- Elevation: 912 ft (278 m)
- GNIS feature ID: 443373

Shideler is an unincorporated community in Union Township, Delaware County, Indiana, in the United States.

== History ==
Shideler had its start by the building of the railroad through that territory. It was named for Isaac Shideler, a railroad promoter who donated the land for use of the depot. A post office was established at Shideler in 1871, and remained in operation until it was discontinued in 1929. The Shideler Grain Company has grown into a major operation in Shideler, begun in 1968 by purchase of the local Farm Co-op Bureau grain elevator.
