= List of Art Deco architecture in Kentucky =

This is a list of buildings that are examples of the Art Deco architectural style in Kentucky, United States.

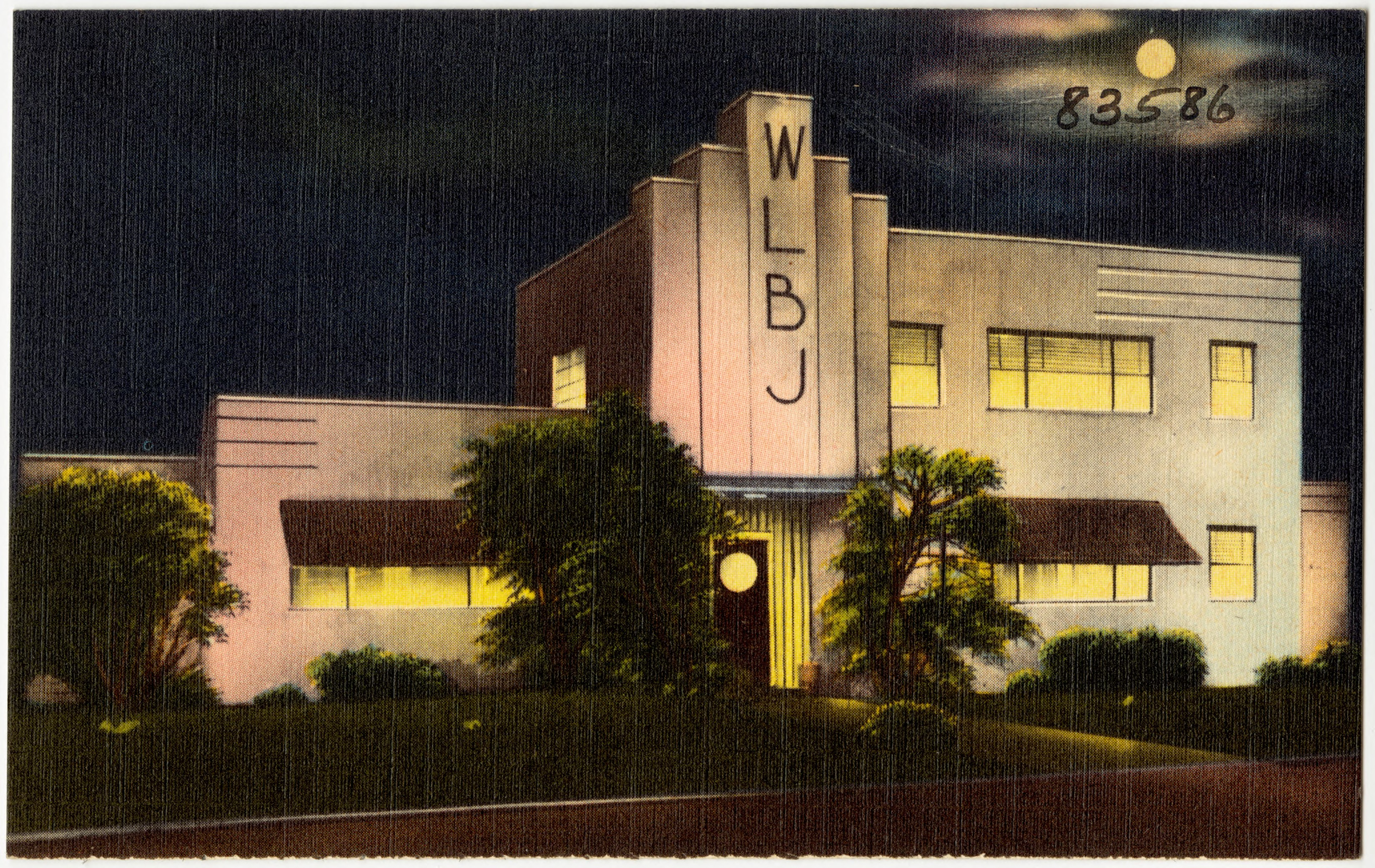
WLBJ Building, Bowling Green

== Bowling Green ==
- Booth Fire & Safety, Bowling Green, 1948
- Capitol Arts Center (former Columbia Theatre), Bowling Green, 1921
- Galloway Farm Equipment (now Booth Fire & Safety), Modern Automotive District, Bowling Green, 1948
- Galloway Motor Company Building, Modern Automotive District, Bowling Green, 1948
- WLBJ Building, Bowling Green, 1940
- William Hardcastle Filling Station, Modern Automotive District, Bowling Green, 1948

== Lexington ==
- F. W. Woolworth Building, Lexington, 1946
- Lexington Laundry Co., Lexington, 1929
- Lexington National Guard Armory, Lexington, 1941

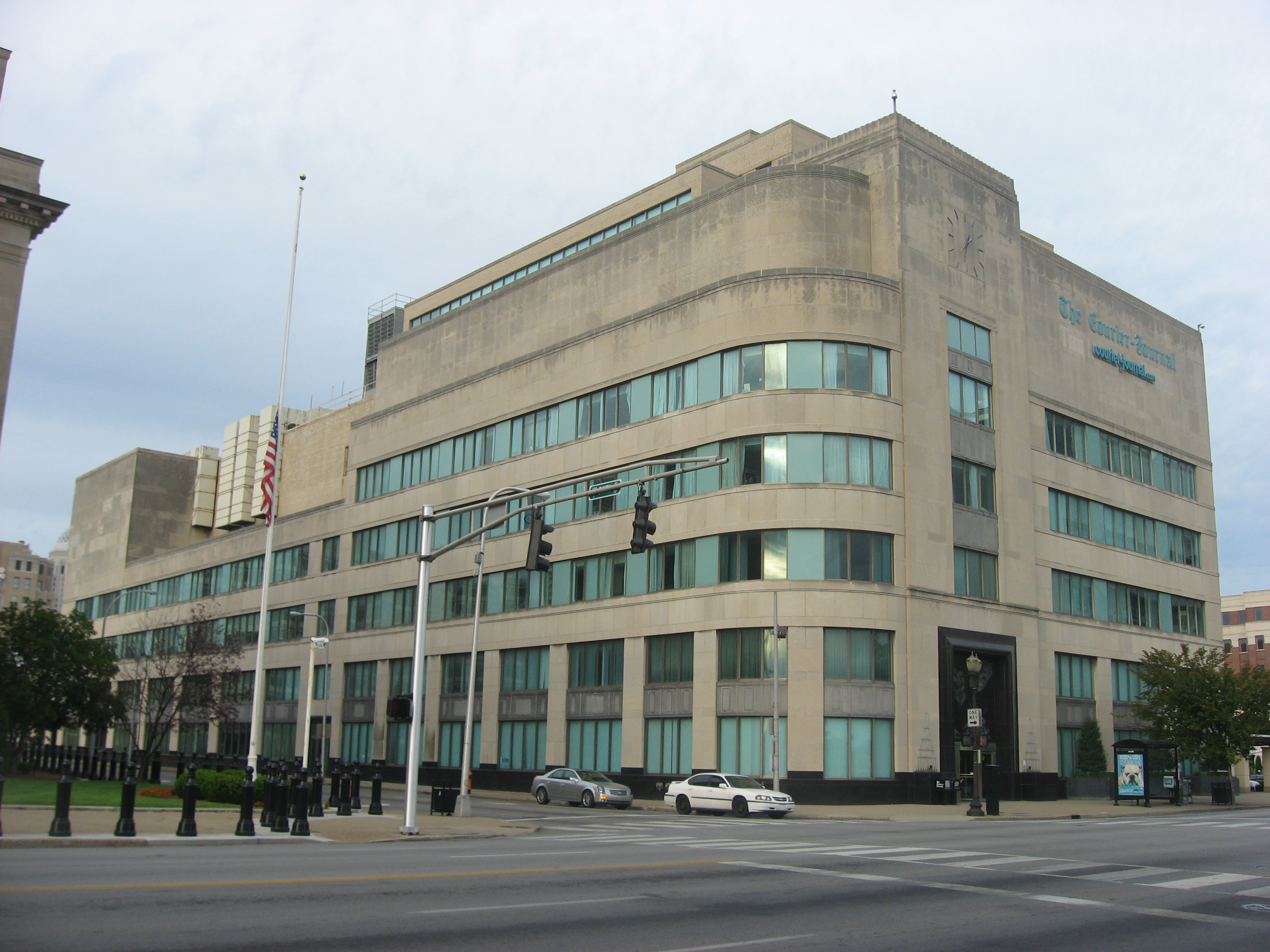
Courier-Journal Building, Louisville

== Louisville ==
- 1495 South 11th Street Building, Louisville, 1935
- American Bluegrass Marble, Louisville
- AT&T Building, Louisville, 1930
- Bernheim Distillery Boiling Plant, Louisville, 1937
- Bowman Field, Louisville, 1921
- Bridges, Smith & Co (former Four Roses Bourbon), Louisville, 1870, 1940s
- Brown-Forman Warehouse, Louisville, 1936
- Byck's Department Store, Louisville, 1924
- Charles D. Jacob Elementary School, Louisville, 1932
- Courier-Journal Building, Louisville
- Fire Department Headquarters, Louisville, 1937
- Fiscal Court Building, Louisville, 1938
- Fisher-Klosterman Building (former Bernheim Distillery Bottling Plant), Louisville, 1937
- George Rogers Clark Memorial Bridge, Louisville, 1929
- Jacob Elementary, Louisville, 1932
- James Russell Lowell Elementary School, Louisville, 1931
- Jones–Dabney Company Laboratory, Louisville, 1935
- Kelley Technical Coatings, Louisville, 1933
- LG&E Building, Louisville, 1925–1928
- Louisville Cotton Mills Administration Building (now a restaurant), Louisville, 1936–1941
- Louisville Fire Department No. 9, Louisville, 1946
- Louisville National Guard Armory, Louisville, 1942
- Louisville Public Works, Louisville, 1934
- Meyzeek Middle School, Louisville, 1929
- Miller Paper Company Buildings, Louisville, 1947
- Norton Healthcare Building, Louisville, 1925
- Ohio Theatre façade, Louisville, 1941
- Seagram's Distillery, Louisville, 1933
- Sears, Roebuck and Company Store, Louisville, 1928
- South Central Bell Company Office Building, Louisville, 1930
- Trinity High School, Louisville, 1941
- Valley Traditional High School, Louisville, 1936, 1953
- Vogue Theatre, Louisville, 1939
- WHAS Radio Transmitter Building, Louisville, 1930s
- Wheeling Corrugating Company Building, Louisville

== Scottsville ==
- Lyric Theater, Scottsville, 1930s
- Horse Shoe Cafeteria, Scottsville Downtown Commercial Historic District, Scottsville, 1915 and 1935
- Washington Overall Factory, Scottsville Downtown Commercial Historic District, Scottsville, 1928, 1930s

== Whitesburg ==
- Boone Youth Drop-In Center (former Boone Motor Company), Whitesburg Historic District, Whitesburg, 1930
- Quillen Building, Whitesburg Historic District, Whitesburg, 1948
- Whitesburg High School Gymnasium, Whitesburg Historic District, Whitesburg, 1940s

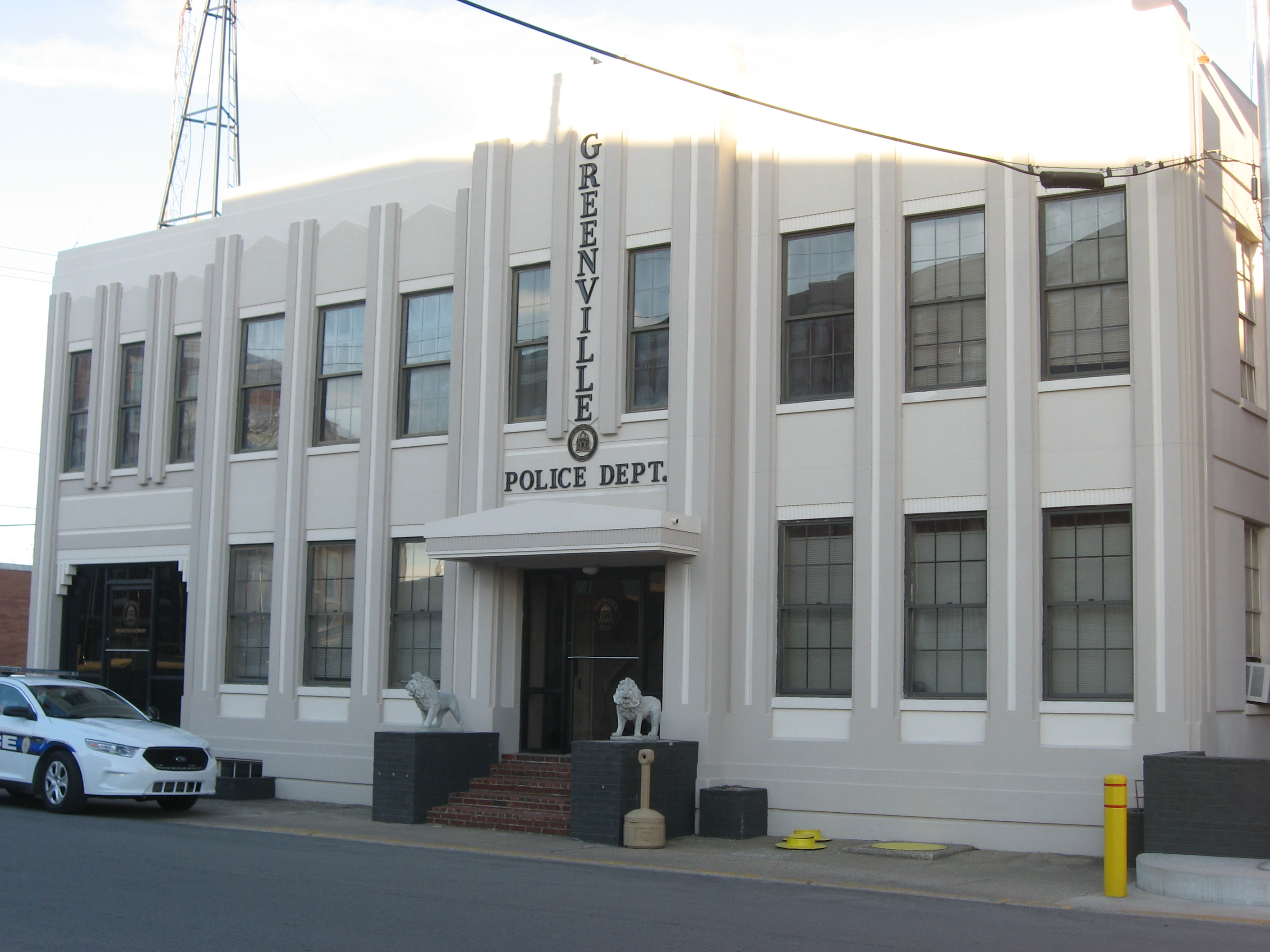
Greenville City Hall (now a police station), Greenville

== Other cities ==
- Arista Theater, Lebanon Historic Commercial District, Lebanon, 1935
- Ashland Armory, Ashland, 1948
- Bell Theater, Pineville
- Burke's Bakery, Danville, 1930
- Caldwell County Courthouse, Princeton Downtown Commercial District, Princeton, 1939
- Capitol Theater, Princeton Downtown Commercial District, Princeton, 1930s
- Carlisle Armory, Carlisle, 1941
- City Hall, Paintsville, 1940
- Coca-Cola Bottling Plant, Paducah, 1939
- Coca-Cola Plant, Shelbyville, 1937
- Devou Park Band Shell, Covington, 1939
- Elizabethtown Armory, Elizabethtown, 1948
- Estill County Courthouse, Irvine Historic Business District, Irvine, 1939
- Eversole Building, Harlan Commercial District, Harlan, 1936
- Estill County Youth Center (former National Guard Armory), Ravenna, 1934
- Greenville City Hall, Greenville, 1940
- Harrodsburg Armory (now Mercer Area Family Education), Harrodsburg, 1942
- Horse Cave State Bank, Horse Cave, 1937
- Jeffersontown Colored School, Jeffersontown, 1930
- Kentucky Theatre/Hartford City Hall Complex, Downtown Hartford Historic District, Hartford, late 1930s
- Lane Theater, Williamsburg, 1948
- Ludlow Theater, Ludlow, 1946
- Mack Theatre, Irvine Historic Business District, Irvine, 1930s
- Madisonville Armory, Madisonville, 1947
- Marianne Theater, Bellevue, 1942
- Ohio County Courthouse, Downtown Hartford Historic District, Hartford, 1943
- Old Wayne County High School, Monticello, 1941
- Paintsville City Hall, Paintsville, 1940
- Paramount Arts Center, Ashland, 1931
- Richmond Armory, Richmond, 1942
- Russelville Armory, Russelville, 1934
- S. E. Cooke Building, Harrodsburg
- Simon Kenton High School, Independence, 1937
- Somerset Armory, Somerset, 1948
- Springfield Armory, Springfield, 1942
- State Theatre, Elizabethtown, 1942
- United States Bullion Depository, Fort Knox, 1936
- United States Post Office, Covington, 1941
- University of Kentucky Cooperative Extension Building (former National Guard Armory), Carlisle, 1941
- Watkins Department Store, Paducah, 1941
- Webster County Courthouse, Dixon, 1938
- Williamsburg National Guard Armory, Williamsburg, 1941
- Worsham Hall, Henderson, 1936

== See also ==
- List of Art Deco architecture
- List of Art Deco architecture in the United States
