= National Register of Historic Places listings in Muhlenberg County, Kentucky =

Location of Muhlenberg County in Kentucky

This is a list of the National Register of Historic Places listings in Muhlenberg County, Kentucky.

This is intended to be a complete list of the properties and districts on the National Register of Historic Places in Muhlenberg County, Kentucky, United States. The locations of National Register properties and districts for which the latitude and longitude coordinates are included below, may be seen in a map.

There are 13 properties and districts listed on the National Register in the county, of which 1 is part of a National Historic Landmark spread across multiple counties.

This National Park Service list is complete through NPS recent listings posted March 21, 2025.

== Current listings ==
	Name on the Register	Image	Date listed	Location	City or town	Description
1	Baker Site (15MU12)		April 1, 1986 (#86000654)	Left bank of the Green River, 3 miles (4.8 km) above the Paradise Fossil Plant; 37°14′18″N 86°56′47″W	Skilesville	Part of the Green River Shell Middens Archeological District National Historic Landmark
2	J. A. Gilman House	J. A. Gilman House	July 14, 2020 (#100005194)	105 Paradise St. 37°12′17″N 87°10′22″W	Greenville	No information seems to be available online.
3	Greenville City Hall	Greenville City Hall	August 26, 1985 (#85001906)	Court Street; 37°12′00″N 87°10′38″W	Greenville	
4	Greenville Commercial Historic District	Greenville Commercial Historic District	August 15, 1985 (#85001903)	100 blocks of N. Main and E. Main Cross Sts. 37°12′05″N 87°10′44″W	Greenville	
5	Martin House	Martin House	August 15, 1985 (#85001900)	144 E. Main Cross St. 37°12′06″N 87°10′29″W	Greenville	Demolished in 2013; gazebo (pictured) constructed on site
6	Muhlenberg County Courthouse	Muhlenberg County Courthouse	December 22, 1978 (#78001390)	Courthouse Sq. 37°12′02″N 87°10′41″W	Greenville	
7	North Main Street Historic District	North Main Street Historic District	August 15, 1985 (#85001904)	100 and 200 blocks of N. Main St. 37°12′14″N 87°10′44″W	Greenville	
8	Old Muhlenberg County Jail	Old Muhlenberg County Jail	August 15, 1985 (#85001901)	Court Row; 37°12′00″N 87°10′40″W	Greenville	Demolished circa 2000
9	Rice Tobacco Factory	Rice Tobacco Factory	August 15, 1985 (#85001902)	112 N. Cherry St. 37°12′08″N 87°10′50″W	Greenville	
10	George Short House	George Short House	September 15, 1980 (#80001661)	121 N. Main St. 37°12′11″N 87°10′45″W	Greenville	
11	South Cherry Street Historic District	South Cherry Street Historic District	August 15, 1985 (#85001905)	Roughly bounded by S. Cherry, Hopkinsville, W. Main Cross, and N. Cherry Sts. 37°11′59″N 87°10′50″W	Greenville	
12	Edward Taylor House		January 2, 2024 (#100009728)	215 East Main Cross Street; 37°12′14″N 87°10′24″W	Greenville	
13	Robert Thomas House	Robert Thomas House	December 6, 1990 (#90001833)	516 Broad St. 37°17′45″N 87°07′05″W	Central City	

== See also ==
- List of National Historic Landmarks in Kentucky
- National Register of Historic Places listings in Kentucky
