= Greenville City Hall =

Greenville City Hall may refer to:

- Greenville City Hall (Greenville, Alabama), listed on the National Register of Historic Places in Butler County, Alabama
- Greenville City Hall (Greenville, Kentucky), listed on the National Register of Historic Places in Muhlenberg County, Kentucky
- Greenville City Hall (Greenville, Mississippi), a Mississippi Landmark
- Greenville City Hall (Greenville, South Carolina), listed on the National Register of Historic Places in Greenville County, South Carolina
