= Beard–Eaves–Memorial Coliseum =

Coliseum on the Auburn University campus

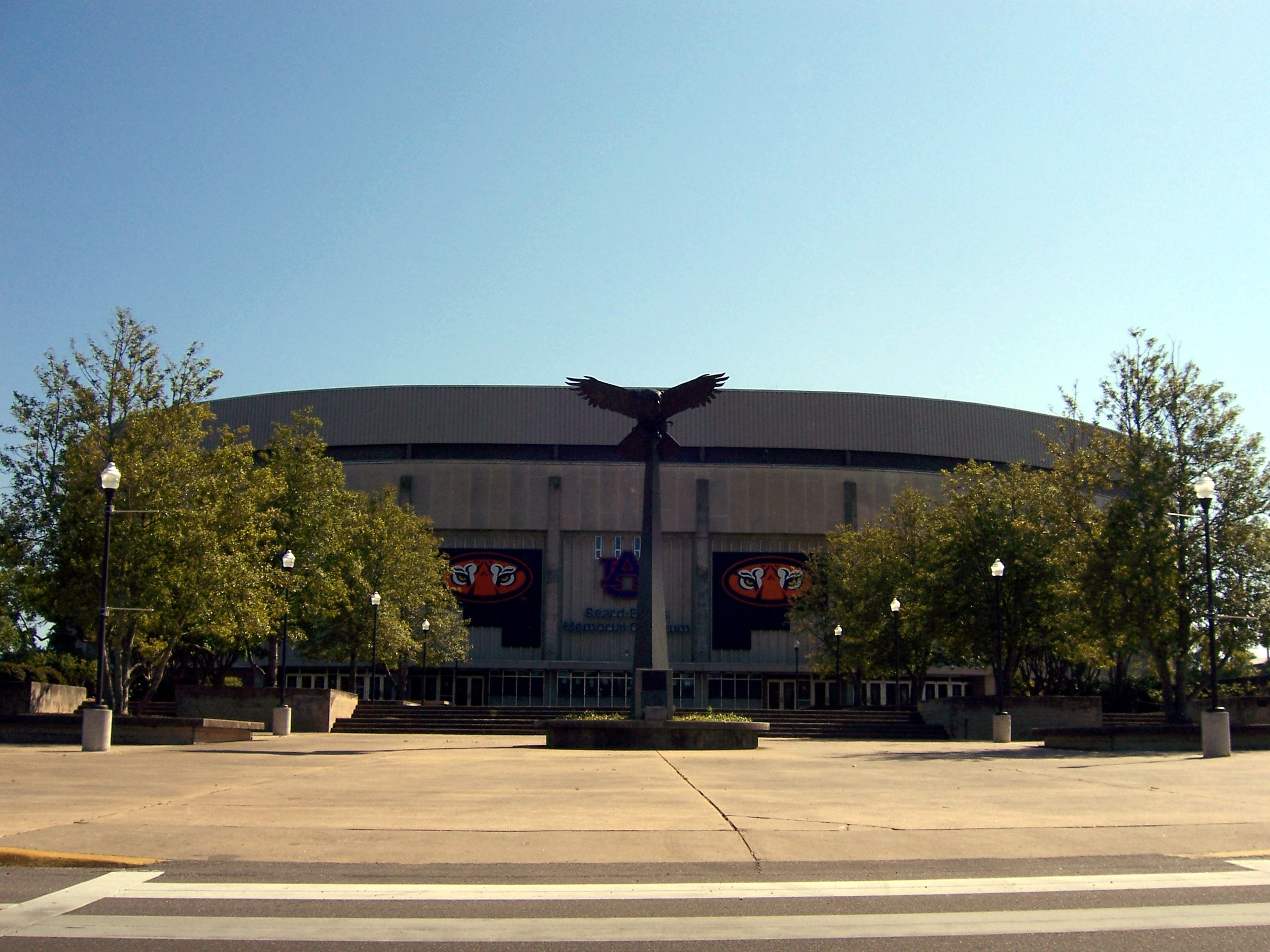
- Interactive map of Beard–Eaves–Memorial Coliseum
- Former names: Memorial Coliseum (1969–1987); Joel H. Eaves Memorial Coliseum (1987–1993)
- Location: Coliseum Dr; Auburn, AL 36832
- Coordinates: 32°36′01″N 85°29′32″W
- Owner: Auburn University
- Operator: Auburn University
- Capacity: 10,500

Construction
- Groundbreaking: 1968
- Opened: January 11, 1969
- Closed: 2010 (for intercollegiate competition)
- Cost: $6.03 Million
- Architect: Sherlock, Smith & Adams

Tenants
- USA team handball (2013–present); Auburn Tigers (NCAA); Men's basketball (1969–2010); Women's basketball (1974–2010); Women's gymnastics (1974–2010); Wrestling (1969–1981)

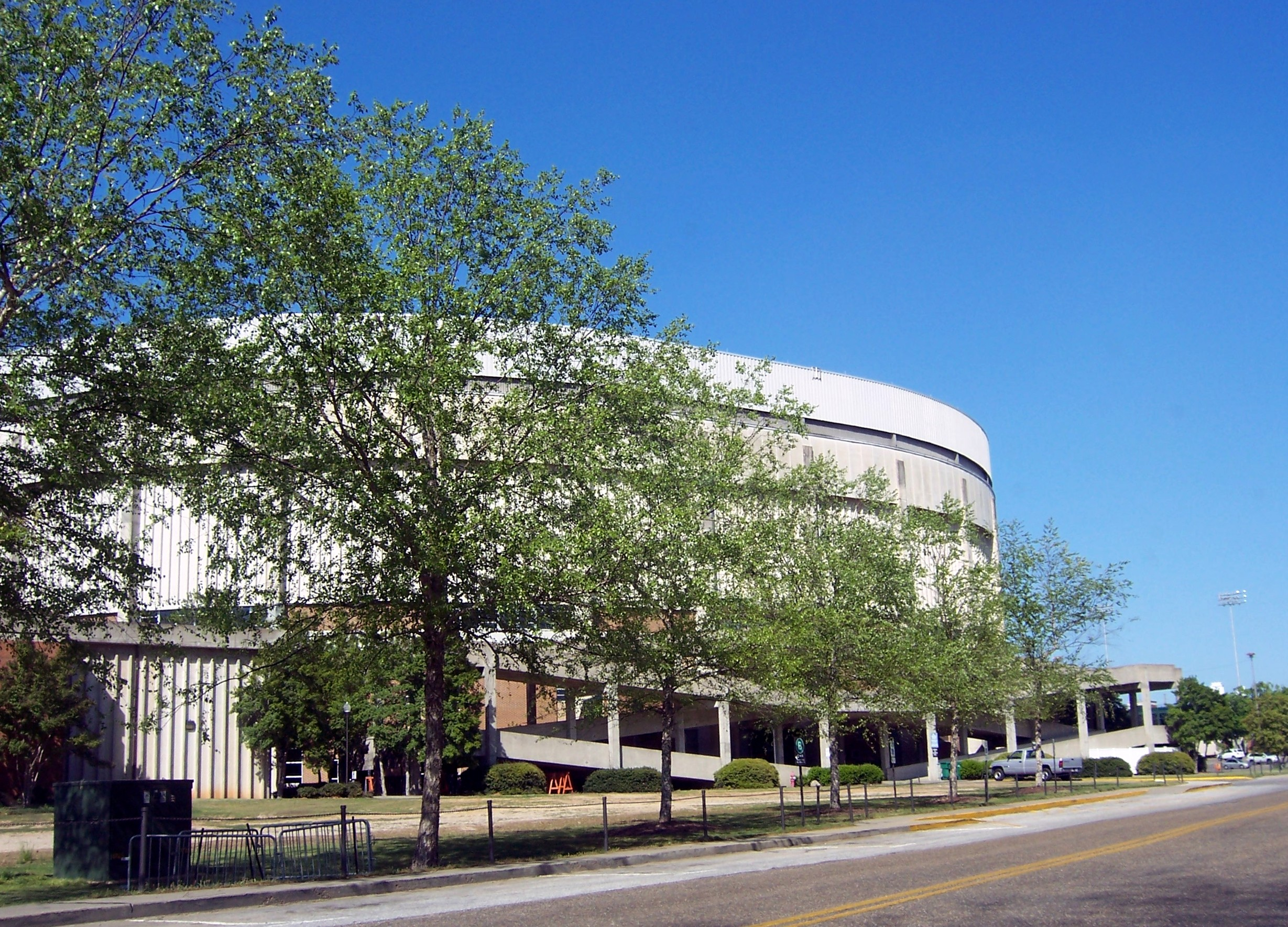
Beard–Eaves–Memorial Coliseum

Beard–Eaves–Memorial Coliseum is a 10,500-seat multi-purpose arena on the campus of Auburn University in Auburn, Alabama. The arena, which opened in 1969, is best known as the former home of the Auburn men's and women's basketball, women's gymnastics, and wrestling teams. The teams finished their stays at the facility at the end of the 2009–10 season, with all of its tenants moving into the new Auburn Arena opening in time for the 2010–11 season. In addition to sports, numerous concerts were held in the facility. The coliseum continues to house athletics offices as well as classrooms and office space for Auburn's Department of Geosciences.

The building's exterior is primarily nondescript concrete, but its entry plaza was recognizable for the large "War Eagle" statue which faced not only the rest of the university, but also nearby Jordan–Hare Stadium.

The architect of the building was Sherlock, Smith & Adams of Montgomery, who also designed Garrett Coliseum. The contractor was Jones and Hardy, Contractors of Montevallo.

== Naming history ==
The building was approved by the state legislature in 1965 to replace the Auburn Sports Arena, a small on-campus building in use from 1946 until the building of the Coliseum. The state supplied the majority of the funds, with the federal government, the university and an athletics department pledge drive making up the rest of the $6,033,597 needed. It was originally named the Memorial Coliseum, in memory of the Auburn soldiers that passed in the Mexican Border wars, WWI and WWII.

In 1987, it was renamed for Joel H. Eaves, a former basketball player and coach who guided the Tigers to their first Southeastern Conference title in 1960 and was the school's all-time winningest coach. It received its current name six years later, adding the name of Jeff Beard, athletic director from 1951 to 1972 during some of Auburn's best years athletically.

Originally, the arena seated 12,500 people. It was downsized to 10,108 in 1994 when offices were created by removing several rows at the top of the end seating areas. Since 1998, it has seated 10,500.

== Uses ==
=== Past and current uses ===
Memorial Coliseum opened January 11, 1969, for a basketball game against LSU where Auburn upset the Pistol Pete Maravich-led LSU team. Auburn men's and women's basketball and gymnastics used the Coliseum until 2010 when Auburn Arena opened. Auburn's men's wrestling team competed at Memorial Coliseum until the program ended in 1981.

When the arena became vacant, Auburn University put it to different uses. During the COVID-19 pandemic, the university used the Coliseum as a COVID testing facility. Students were required to receive COVID testing before their first day of school on August 17, 2020. The third floor of the Coliseum was a vaccination destination for the Auburn area. Auburn University also used the Coliseum to distribute a booster vaccination in 2021 to those who couldn't get an appointment at pharmacies. Students continue to use the Coliseum for club sport practices and Greek life events.

As of early 2024, the university is studying plans regarding the future use of the Coliseum. Options include a major renovation of the interior or eventual demolition. A renovation would include new and expanded space for Volleyball and Wheelchair basketball among other athletic and multipurpose uses. The Coliseum was originally planned for demolition after the completion of the 2009-2010 basketball season. At the time there were plans to replace the facility with a parking deck but they never materialized.

== Notable events ==
=== Music ===
==== Concerts ====
1960s - 1970s concerts
Artist	Date	Notes
Rolling Stones	November 14, 1969	3 hours late performing.
Chuck Berry	November 14, 1969	
B.B. King	November 14, 1969	
Steppenwolf	April 23, 1970	
Neil Diamond	May 15, 1970	
Chicago	January 22, 1971	
The Allman Brothers Band	February 12, 1972	
Rod Stewart	April 25, 1972	
Elton John	October 18, 1973	
Elvis Presley	March 5, 1974	Sold out
The Doobie Brothers	May 9, 1974	
James Taylor	April 30, 1976	
Bruce Springsteen	May 11, 1976	
Gordon Lightfoot	February 11, 1977	
Jimmy Buffett	April 18, 1979	Buffett briefly attended Auburn

1980s - 1990s concerts
Artist	Date	Notes
The Eagles	February 1, 1980	
Pat Benatar	February 24, 1983	
Joan Jett & The Black Hearts	May 4, 1983	
Lionel Richie with The Pointer Sisters	November 3, 1983	
Tina Turner	November 8, 1985	Private Dancer Tour
Jimmy Buffett	November 7, 1986	
R.E.M.	November 23, 1987	
Whitney Houston	December 1, 1987	Moment of Truth World Tour
Jimmy Buffett	January 25, 1990	
Lenny Kravitz	February 11, 1992	
The Cult	February 11, 1992	
Widespread Panic	February 18, 1994	
Alan Jackson	March 4, 1994	
Dave Matthews Band	April 27, 1994	
Reba McEntire	April 29, 1994	
Blues Travelers	April 19, 1995	
The Allman Brothers Band	November 3, 1995	
Dishwalla & Gin Blossoms	April 19, 1996	"Congratulations I'm Sorry" Tour
Widespread Panic	November 4, 1996	
Third Eye Blind	October 30, 1998	
Willie Nelson	May 6, 1999	

2000s - 2010s concerts
Artist	Date	Notes
Third Day & Tait	October 9, 2002	"Come Together" Tour
3 Doors Down	October 25, 2002	
Akon	April 9, 2008	
O.A.R	September 29, 2008	
TobyMac & Skillet	March 28, 2010	
Luke Bryan	November 18, 2011	
Luke Bryan	October 5, 2012	
Dierks Bentley	November 2, 2012	
Rascal Flatts	January 24, 2014	
Thomas Rhett	January 25, 2014	

===== Music videos =====
In 1988, American funk-metal band, Living Colour released their single Cult of Personality. The single charted at 13 on the US Billboard and is ranked at 69 on VH1's top 100 rock song list. Within the video, there are clips of political speeches, from Malcolm X, John F. Kennedy, and Franklin D. Roosevelt. The video has clips of Living Colour performing the song on the Beard–Eaves–Memorial Coliseum stage.

=== Sports ===
On March 25–27, 1971, the Memorial Coliseum hosted the 41st Annual NCAA Wrestling Championships.

=== Other Notable Events ===
In May 1973, Muhammad Ali gave a speech at the Coliseum in which he said "It is refreshing to see so many people of all nationalities and races all here in unity in a place like Alabama." Comedian and actor Bob Hope performed a show on October 25, 1974. The Coliseum hosted the university's spring and fall Commencement ceremony until 2010. Then sitting Vice President of the United States Dick Cheney gave the Spring 2004 address, former Auburn football player Bo Jackson gave the Spring 2009 address, and Tim Cook, Auburn graduate and then chief operating officer of Apple Inc., gave the address at the last ceremony held in the Coliseum in spring 2010.

== See also ==
- Neville Arena
- Jordan–Hare Stadium
- Samford Stadium – Hitchcock Field at Plainsman Park
