= Greenville Commercial Historic District =

Greenville Commercial Historic District may refer to:

- Greenville Commercial Historic District (Greenville, Kentucky), listed on the NRHP in Muhlenberg County, Kentucky
- Greenville Commercial Historic District (Greenville, Mississippi), listed on the NRHP in Mississippi
- Greenville Commercial Historic District (Greenville, North Carolina), listed on the NRHP in Pitt County, North Carolina
- Greenville South Broadway Commercial District, Greenville, Ohio, listed on the NRHP in Darke County, Ohio
- Greenville Commercial Historic District (Greenville, Pennsylvania), listed on the NRHP in Mercer County, Pennsylvania
