= National Register of Historic Places listings in Whitley County, Kentucky =

Location of Whitley County in Kentucky

This is a list of the National Register of Historic Places listings in Whitley County, Kentucky.

This is intended to be a complete list of the properties and districts on the National Register of Historic Places in Whitley County, Kentucky, United States. The locations of National Register properties and districts for which the latitude and longitude coordinates are included below, may be seen in a map.

There are 13 properties and districts listed on the National Register in the county.

This National Park Service list is complete through NPS recent listings posted December 12, 2025.

== Current listings ==
	Name on the Register	Image	Date listed	Location	City or town	Description
1	Bowman Site (15WH14)		November 30, 1985 (#85002974)	Address Restricted	Lot	A Mississippian mound site also known as the "Bowman Mound"
2	Carnegie Library	Carnegie Library	March 28, 1986 (#86000603)	400 Roy Kidd Avenue; 36°57′01″N 84°05′38″W	Corbin	
3	Corbin Bank Building	Corbin Bank Building	March 28, 1986 (#86000604)	101 Center St. 36°56′58″N 84°05′49″W	Corbin	
4	East Main Street Bridge	East Main Street Bridge	March 28, 1986 (#86000605)	Engineer St. and Lynn Camp Creek; 36°57′11″N 84°05′40″W	Corbin	
5	First Christian Church	First Christian Church	March 28, 1986 (#86000693)	100 South Kentucky Avenue; 36°56′48″N 84°05′51″W	Corbin	
6	Dr. Ancil Gatliff House	Dr. Ancil Gatliff House	August 11, 1980 (#80001689)	S. 5th St. 36°44′27″N 84°09′41″W	Williamsburg	
7	J.B. Gatliff House	J.B. Gatliff House	December 16, 1977 (#77000663)	10th and Main Sts. 36°44′08″N 84°10′01″W	Williamsburg	
8	Gordon Hill Road Historic District	Gordon Hill Road Historic District	March 28, 1986 (#86000692)	309-501 Gordon Hill Rd. 36°56′53″N 84°06′02″W	Corbin	
9	Lane Theater	Lane Theater	November 26, 2004 (#04001255)	510 Main St. 36°44′28″N 84°09′43″W	Williamsburg	
10	Louisville and Nashville Railroad Depot	Louisville and Nashville Railroad Depot	June 15, 1978 (#78001414)	Lynn Ave. 36°56′51″N 84°05′44″W	Corbin	
11	Mershon Building	Mershon Building	March 28, 1986 (#86000606)	E. Center St. 36°56′58″N 84°05′46″W	Corbin	
12	Williamsburg Armory	Williamsburg Armory	September 6, 2002 (#02000930)	S. 2nd St. 36°44′13″N 84°09′25″W	Williamsburg	
13	Williamsburg Historic District		April 25, 2019 (#100003683)	Main & Main Cross Sts. 36°44′34″N 84°09′36″W	Williamsburg	

== See also ==
- List of National Historic Landmarks in Kentucky
- National Register of Historic Places listings in Kentucky
