= Moreland G. Smith =

American architect (1906–1989)

- Born: December 15, 1906; Adrian, Michigan
- Died: June 26, 1989 (aged 82); Atlanta
- Occupation: Architect
- Awards: Fellow, American Institute of Architects (1961)
- Practice: Moreland G. Smith; Sherlock & Smith; Sherlock, Smith & Adams
- Buildings: Greenville City Hall (1937); Garrett Coliseum (1953)

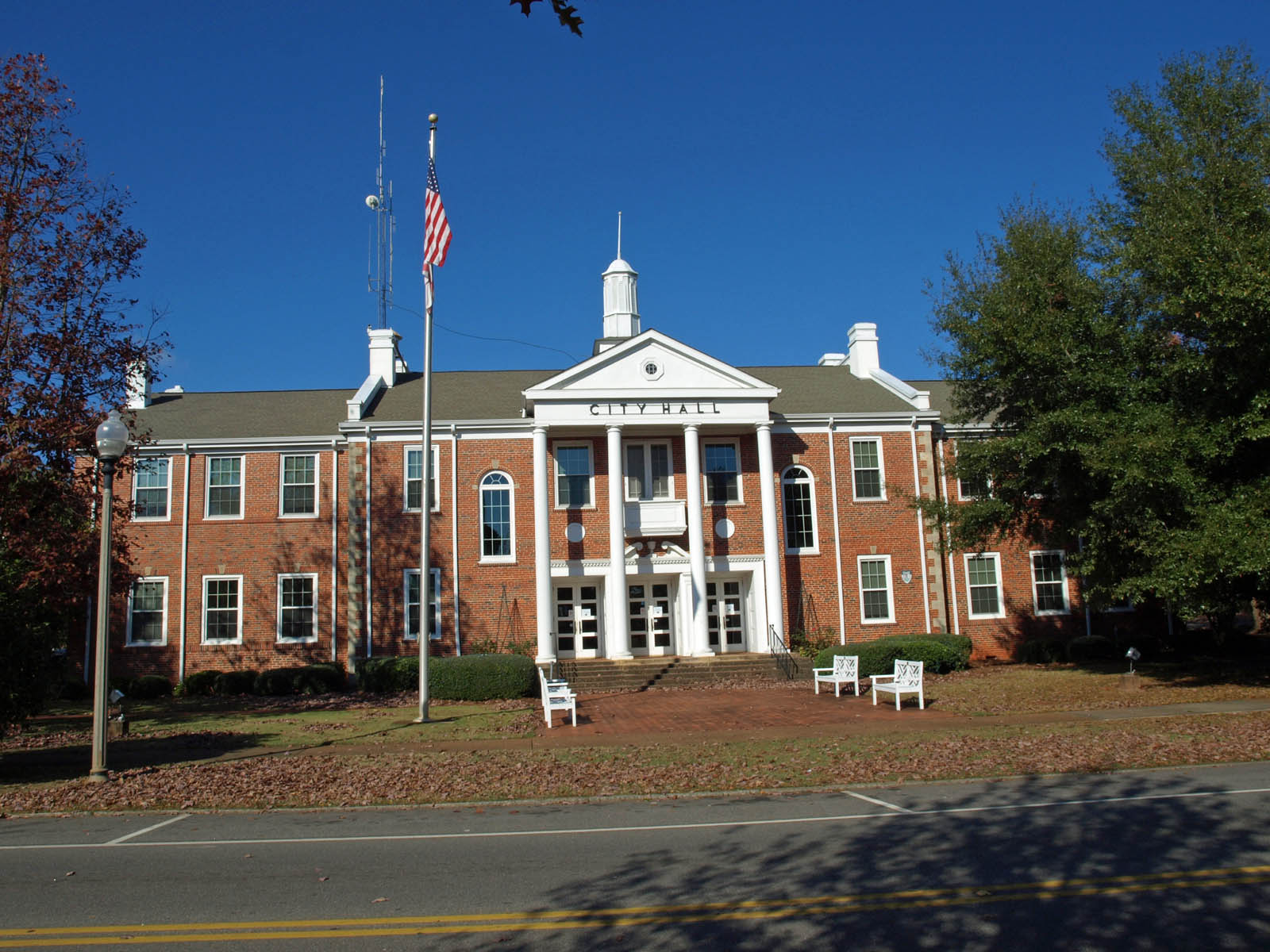
The Greenville City Hall, designed by Moreland G. Smith and completed in 1937.

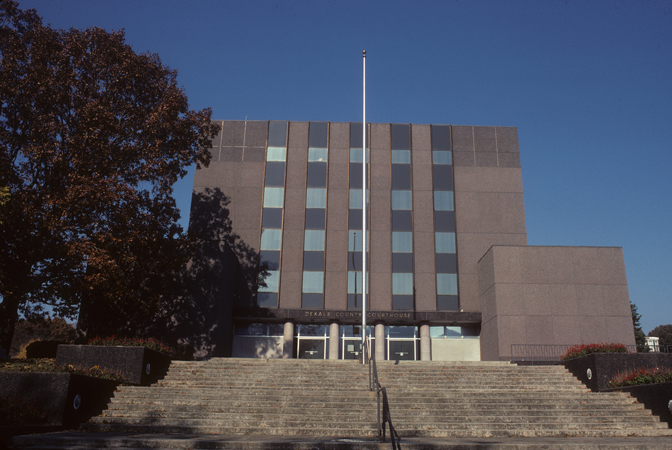
The DeKalb County Courthouse in Fort Payne, designed by Sherlock, Smith & Adams and completed in 1950.

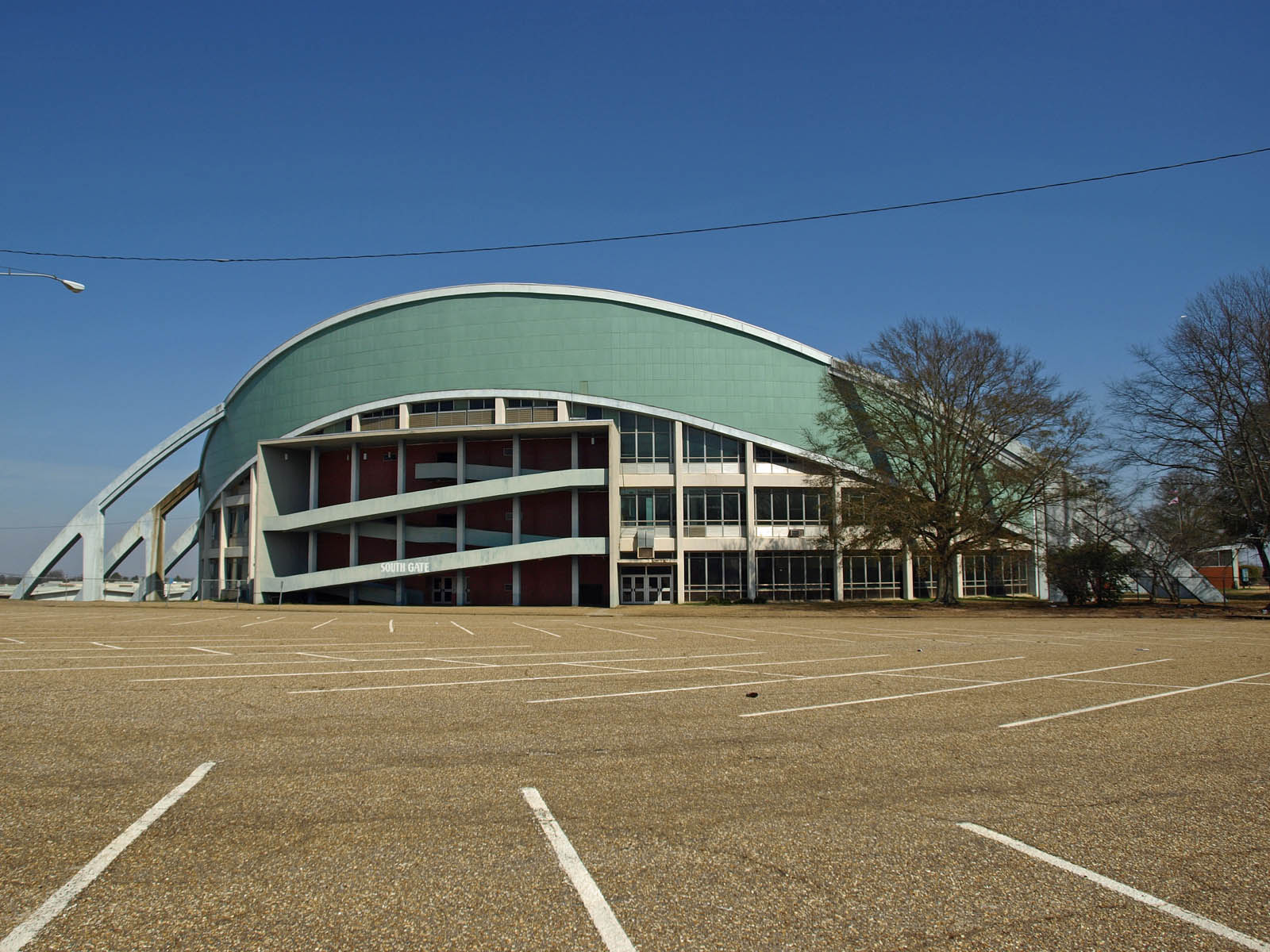
The Garrett Coliseum in Montgomery, Alabama, designed by Sherlock, Smith & Adams and completed in 1953.

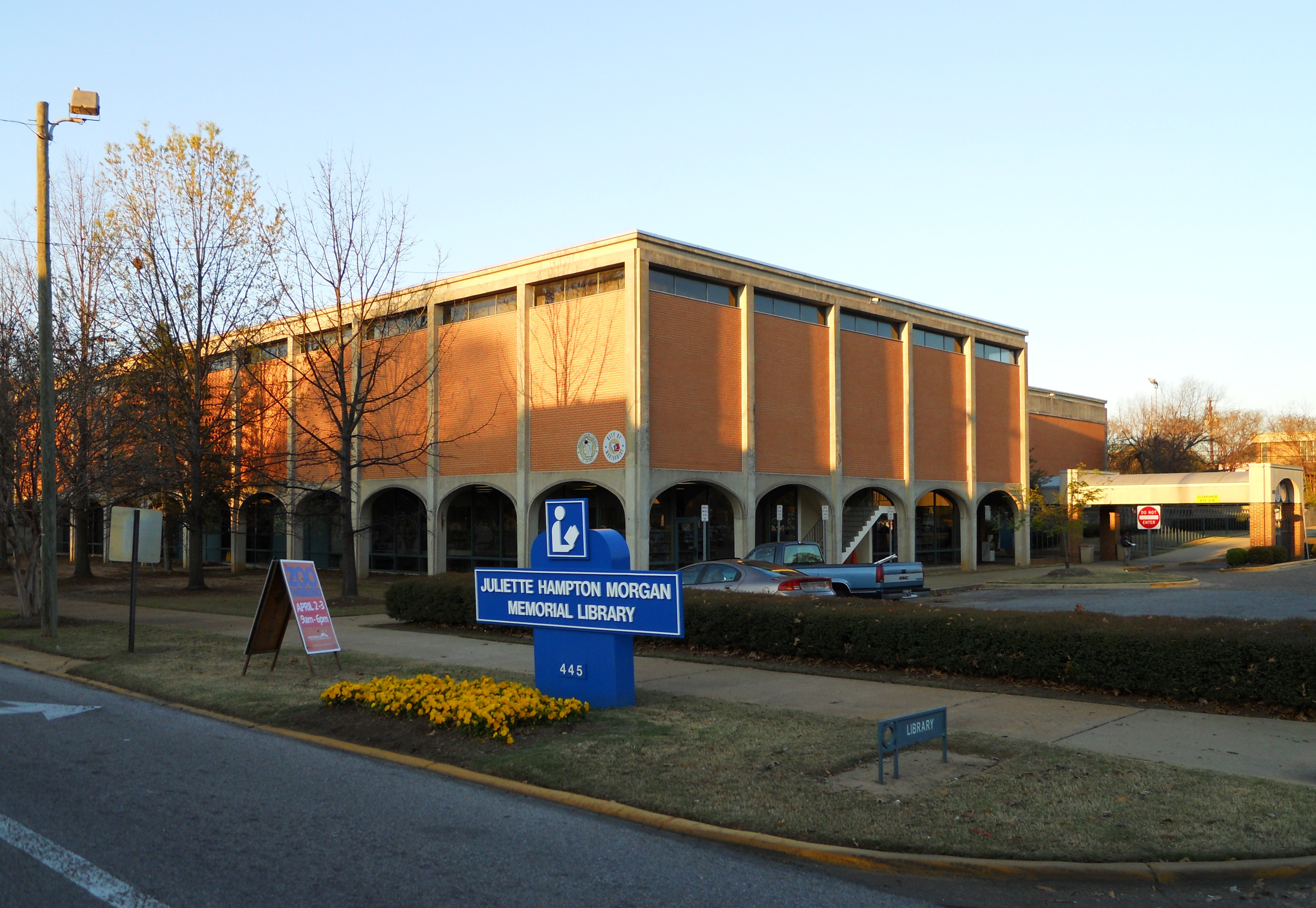
The Juliette Hampton Morgan Memorial Library of the Montgomery City-County Public Library, designed by Sherlock, Smith & Adams and completed in 1960.

The Monroe County Courthouse in Monroeville, Alabama, designed by Sherlock, Smith & Adams and completed in 1963.

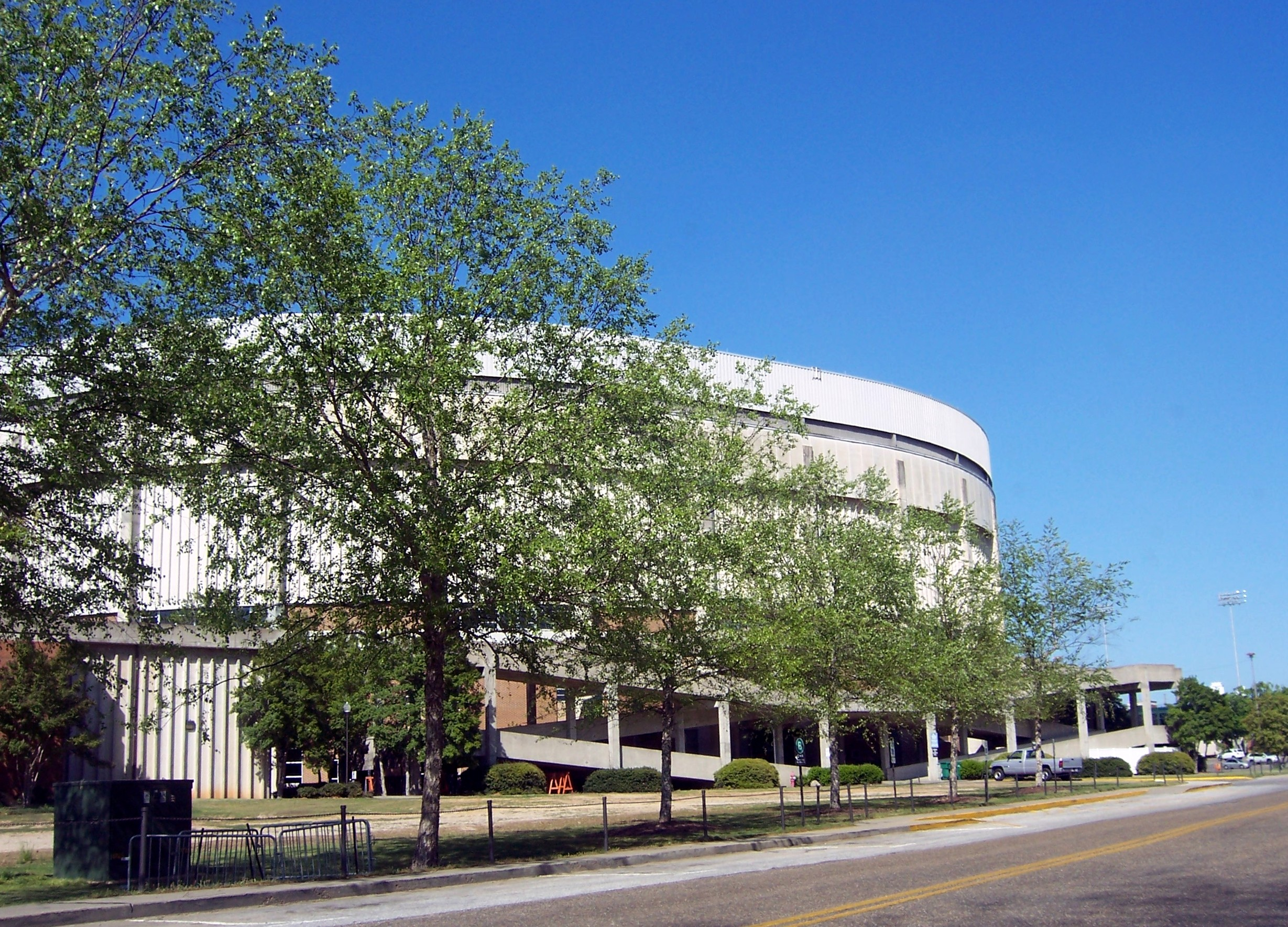
The Beard–Eaves–Memorial Coliseum of Auburn University, designed by Sherlock, Smith & Adams and completed in 1969.

Moreland G. Smith FAIA (December 15, 1906 – June 26, 1989) was an American architect and civil rights activist. Smith practiced architecture in Montgomery, Alabama from 1933 to 1964 and was thereafter a consultant in Atlanta. The Montgomery firm he cofounded in 1945 remains in business as the SS&A Design Collective.

== Life and career ==
Moreland Griffith Smith was born December 15, 1906, to Charles Milton Smith and Jennie Smith, née Moreland, in Adrian, Michigan, his mother's hometown. He grew up in Montgomery, where his parents had lived since their marriage. He was educated in the Montgomery public schools and at Auburn University, earning a BArch in 1928. After graduation he joined Dougherty & Gardner, Nashville architects. In 1931 he took leave to attend Fontainebleau, and left in 1932 to enroll in the Massachusetts Institute of Technology. He earned his MArch in 1933 and returned to Montgomery, where he opened his own office.

Smith's early works included the Greenville City Hall (1937) and Cleveland Court (1943), an apartment complex that was later the home of Rosa Parks during the Montgomery bus boycott. In 1942 Smith closed his office to serve in the United States Army Corps of Engineers, in which he would serve for the duration of the war. In 1945 he returned to Montgomery, where he and engineer Chris J. Sherlock formed the partnership of Sherlock & Smith, expanded in 1946 as Sherlock, Smith & Adams to include architect Richard J. Adams. As originally conceived, Sherlock was in charge of marketing and engineering, Smith was in charge of finances, office management and schematic design and Adams was responsible for later phases of design and drafting.

The new firm had a general practice with a specific focus on healthcare. In 1952 the firm and their work were the subject of a regular feature in Progressive Architecture, "The Architect and his Community." The partnership's work included the Garrett Coliseum (1953). This received a merit award from the AIA Gulf States Region. Two events occurred in 1954: Sherlock withdrew from the partnership, and Smith became involved in the civil rights movement, having unsuccessfully encouraged Montgomery major W. A. Gayle to loosen the rules around segregated bus services in Montgomery prior to the bus boycott. In 1957 Smith joined the board of trustees of the Tuskegee Institute. As chair of the buildings and grounds committee he oversaw the commissioning and construction of the Tuskegee chapel, which at his urging was designed by Paul Rudolph, like Smith an Auburn graduate, with associate architects Fry & Welch, a Black-owned architecture firm based in Washington, D.C.

Smith's consistent advocacy eventually drew the ire of segregationist Alabama governor George Wallace–and made his partners nervous. In a memoir, Smith's wife later wrote that:

“One day, Union Bank and Trust President John Neill, called in Moreland, who served on the bank’s board of directors. He told Moreland that Gov. George Wallace had said the state (of Alabama) would give the bank no more business unless they cut off Moreland’s credit. Moreland realized this was a turning point, that he could not run his business without credit. His young associates had become increasingly concerned and were only too glad to buy the business when it was offered to them.”

Smith sold his 86% interest in Sherlock, Smith & Adams in 1964–at a heavy premium. According to a contract signed at the time, after a fifteen-month leave of absence Smith was to return to the firm September 1, 1965 as chairman of the board. His employment could be terminated by either Smith or his former partners with three-month notice. He returned as planned on September 1 and he was given this notice that day.

During his leave Smith had served as chairman of the Alabama Advisory Committee, the Alabama representative of the United States Commission on Civil Rights. After leaving his firm for a second time, Smith joined the staff of the Southern Regional Council (SRC) as the head of the Urban Planning Project. The SRC was based in Atlanta, where Smith would live for the rest of his life. He also maintained a small consulting practice during this time.

After Smith withdrew from the firm, Sherlock, Smith & Adams leaned in to its healthcare specialty. Later works have included the Beard–Eaves–Memorial Coliseum (1969) at Auburn University, Naval Hospital Bremerton (1981, joint venture with John Graham & Company) and the Rosa Parks Museum (2000) in Montgomery.

Smith joined the American Institute of Architects in 1933 and served as Montgomery chapter president in 1937 and 1957. In 1955 Smith sat on the AIA committee that chose Hugh Stubbins, an Alabama native, as the architect for the Kongresshalle Berlin, now the Haus der Kulturen der Welt. He was elected a Fellow in 1961. In 1987 the Atlanta chapter honored him for his work during the early years of the civil rights movement.

== Personal life ==
Smith was married in 1934 to Marjorie Levy, who shared in his civil rights advocacy. They had three children, one son and two daughters. He died June 26, 1989, in Atlanta at the age of 82.

== Architectural works ==
=== Moreland G. Smith, 1933–1942 ===
- 1937 – Greenville City Hall, (Note: NRHP-listed.) 119 E Commerce St, Greenville, Alabama
- 1943 – Cleveland Court, Cleveland Ct, Montgomery, Alabama

=== Sherlock, Smith & Adams, from 1946 ===
- 1949 – St. Andrew Episcopal Church, 701 W Montgomery Rd, Tuskegee, Alabama
- 1950 – DeKalb County Courthouse, (Note: Altered.) 200 Grand Ave, Fort Payne, Alabama
- 1951 – Capitol Towers Apartments, 7 Clayton St, Montgomery, Alabama
- 1953 – Garrett Coliseum, 1555 Federal Dr, Montgomery, Alabama
- 1954 – Normandale Shopping Center, 634 E Patton Ave, Montgomery, Alabama
- 1955 – Avon Park Center, (Note: Designed by Sherlock, Smith & Adams and Heim & Heim, associated architects.) with 100 W College Dr, Avon Park, Florida
- 1960 – Juliette Hampton Morgan Memorial Library, 245 High St, Montgomery, Alabama
- 1963 – Monroe County Courthouse, 65 N Monroe St, Monroeville, Alabama
- 1963 – Montgomery County Health Department, 515 W Fred D Gray Ave, Montgomery, Alabama
- 1965 – Geneva County Courthouse, 200 N Commerce St, Geneva, Alabama
- 1968 – Marengo County Courthouse, 101 E Coats Ave, Linden, Alabama
- 1969 – Beard–Eaves–Memorial Coliseum, Auburn University, Auburn, Alabama
