= Jeff Beard =

American athletic director

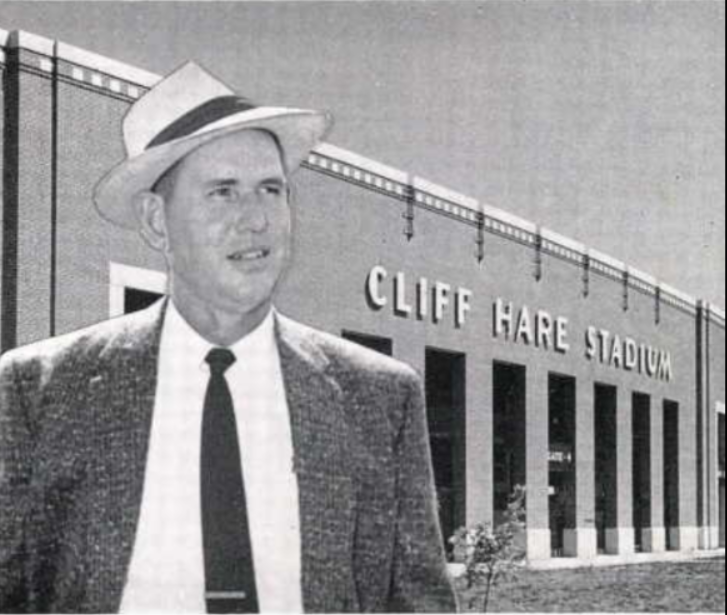
- Beard from 1956 Glommerata yearbook
- Born: Garland Washington Beard; August 4, 1910
- Died: November 10, 1995 (aged 85)
- Occupation: Athletic director
- Years active: 1950–1972
- Employer: Auburn University

Garland Washington "Jeff" Beard (August 4, 1910 – November 10, 1995) was the athletic director at Auburn University from 1951 to 1972. He hired Ralph Jordan as the Auburn Tigers football coach and expanded the seating capacity at Cliff Hare Stadium from 20,000 to 63,000, and oversaw the construction of Beard–Eaves–Memorial Coliseum. He has been inducted into the Alabama Sports Hall of Fame and the Athletic Director Hall of Fame.

== Biography ==
Beard was born in Hardinsburg, Kentucky, and grew up in Greensboro, Alabama. In 1928, he enrolled at Auburn and became captain of the track team and Southern Conference champion in the discus throw. He graduated from Auburn in 1932 and returned to the university in 1933 as business manager of athletics. In 1937, he also became Auburn's assistant track and field coach.

Beard was promoted to athletic director in February 1951. In the three years prior to his promotion, the Auburn Tigers football team had compiled a 3–22–3, including a winless 0–10 season in 1950. Beard's first major decision as athletic director was the hiring of Ralph Jordan as head coach of the football team. Beard was also responsible for expanding the seating capacity at Cliff Hare Stadium from 20,000 to 63,000 and for the construction of the Memorial Coliseum, later renamed the Beard–Eaves–Memorial Coliseum.

Beard stepped down as Auburn's athletic director in July 1972. He remained at Auburn with the title Director Emeritus of Athletics. All told, he spent all but one of the first 44 years of his adult life on the Plains as a student, athletics official, coach, and athletic director.

In 1974, Beard was inducted into the Alabama Sports Hall of Fame and the Athletic Director Hall of Fame. Beard died in 1995 at age 85.

Beard's brother Percy Beard was an Auburn alumnus who won the silver medal in the 110 metre hurdles at the 1932 Summer Olympics and later served as track coach at the University of Florida.
