= Jeffersontown Colored School =

Historic school building that served African Americans in Kentucky

Jeffersontown Colored School, which became Alexander-Ingram School in 1961, is a historic school building at 10400 Shelby Street in Jeffersontown, Kentucky, a suburb of Louisville, Kentucky. Completed in 1930, it is listed on the National Register of Historic Places. It is owned by the First Baptist Church of Jeffersontown. The art deco brick school building was designed by Oscar W. Holmes.

A Rosenwald School, It was preceded by a church used for schooling and then a house on Shelby Street. After integration it was used as an annex for Jeffersontown's elementary school until 1965.

The school became known as Alexander-Ingram School for teacher and principal Virginia B. Alexander, a (teacher/principal from 1922 to 1931) and teacher Annie C. Ingram who taught at the school from 1914 to 1919. Teacher Sadie Mae Abstain attended the school before her more than 40 years of teaching at the school from its opening in 1931 until it closed after desegregation in 1961.

== See also ==
- List of African-American historic places
- List of public schools in Louisville, Kentucky
- National Register of Historic Places listings in Jefferson County, Kentucky
- List of Art Deco architecture in Kentucky
- Central Colored School
