= Marianne Theater =

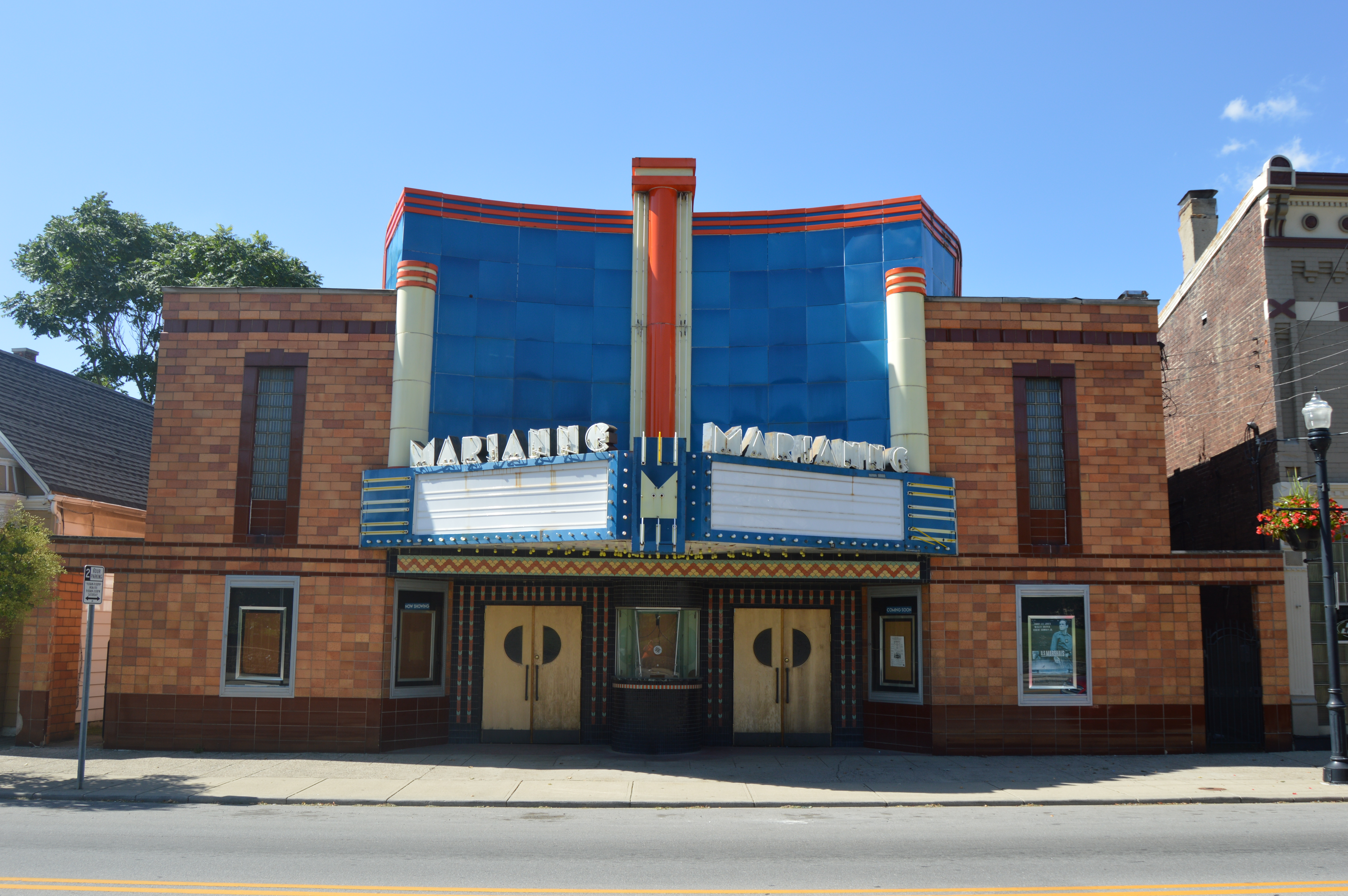
- Front of the Marianne Theater
- Location: 609 Fairfield Avenue Bellevue, Kentucky
- Area: <1 acre
- Built: 1942
- Architect: Paul B. Kiel
- Architectural style: Art Deco
- Added to NRHP: 2015

The Marianne Theater is an art deco single screen movie theater located in Bellevue, Kentucky, that was added to the National Register of Historical Places in 2015. The Marianne was built in 1942 and served at Bellevue's primary theater until the building was permanently closed after a fire in 1992. The city of Bellevue bought the location in 2014, but the building has sat empty since despite efforts to create a new use for the vacant theater.

== History ==
Before the Marianne Theater was built, the Alcazar Theater stood at the site. Built in 1909, the Alcazar was run by the Bellevue Amusement Co. until it was sold in 1912. The Alcazar continued to operate under the same name and furnishings until its closure in 1925.

In 1916, Peter Smith bought the Avenal Theater located at 711 Fairfield and in 1922 he built a larger and more modern theater at 318 Fairfield called the Sylvia, named after one of his daughters. The Avenal closed in 1930, and the Sylvia closed in 1944. Peter Smith opened the Marianne Theater on March 1, 1942, which was named after his other daughter, Blanche Marianne. At the time, the theater was considered to be modern in design and amenities. Seating capacity was around 540. The screen had a small stage in front and red velvet curtains on both sides. During the 1950s and 1960s, the Newport City directories indicate initial management by Blanche Smith and later on by Edward G. and Louis J. Smith.

In 1983, the theater was bought by Anne Cohen, the owner of the Elsmere Village Cinema, who sold it a few years later to the Grand Theaters of Cincinnati. After this, the theater closed for a period of time to make repairs to the marquee and concession area and replace the carpets and cooling system.

In 1992, plastic bags left inside the popcorn machine exploded, causing a fire that was extinguished quickly but left extensive smoke damage. The theater was forced to close until a health inspector approved a reopening, which never came.

=== Post fire ===
The City of Bellevue purchased the Marianne from Jack Eck for $138,380 in April 2014. The deal came after three years of work had been made by then Mayor Ed Riehl and other officials to obtain ownership. Originally, the city council wanted to buy the building to preserve the Marianne and prevent it from being drastically changed by a new owner. Since acquiring the building, the city's leadership has infrequently discussed possible plans on using or selling the theater. On May 13, 2026, the Bellevue's city council discussed selling the Marianne Theater, a plan Mayor Charlie Cleves says has a high chance of success. In 2026, a non-profit called the Mariane Arts and Education Center plans to buy and restore the theater.

== See also ==
- List of Art Deco architecture in Kentucky
