= Scottsville Downtown Commercial Historic District =

Historic district in Kentucky, United States

- U.S. National Register of Historic Places
- U.S. Historic district
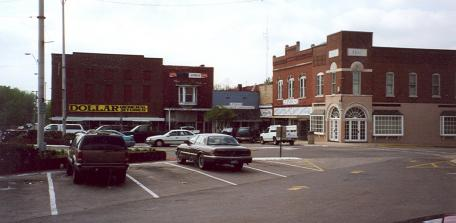

- Location within Kentucky Location within the United States
- Location: Public Square and extending roughly one block N and S on Court St., and one block E and W on Main, Scottsville, Kentucky
- Coordinates: 36°45′13″N 86°11′27″W
- Area: 14 acres (5.7 ha)
- Architectural style: Early Commercial
- NRHP reference No.: 01000797
- Added to NRHP: August 2, 2001

The Scottsville Downtown Commercial Historic District, in Scottsville, Kentucky is a 14 acres (5.7 ha) historic district which was listed on the National Register of Historic Places in 2001.

It included 29 contributing buildings and three non-contributing ones. It includes Scottsville's Public Square, which was site of the Allen County Courthouse until 1965, and it extends roughly one block north and south on Court St., and one block east and west on Main St.

The buildings are primarily one- and two-story brick and wood-frame with brick veneer commercial buildings, built between 1881 and 1946.
