= Corbin station =

- Louisville and Nashville Railroad Depot
- U.S. National Register of Historic Places
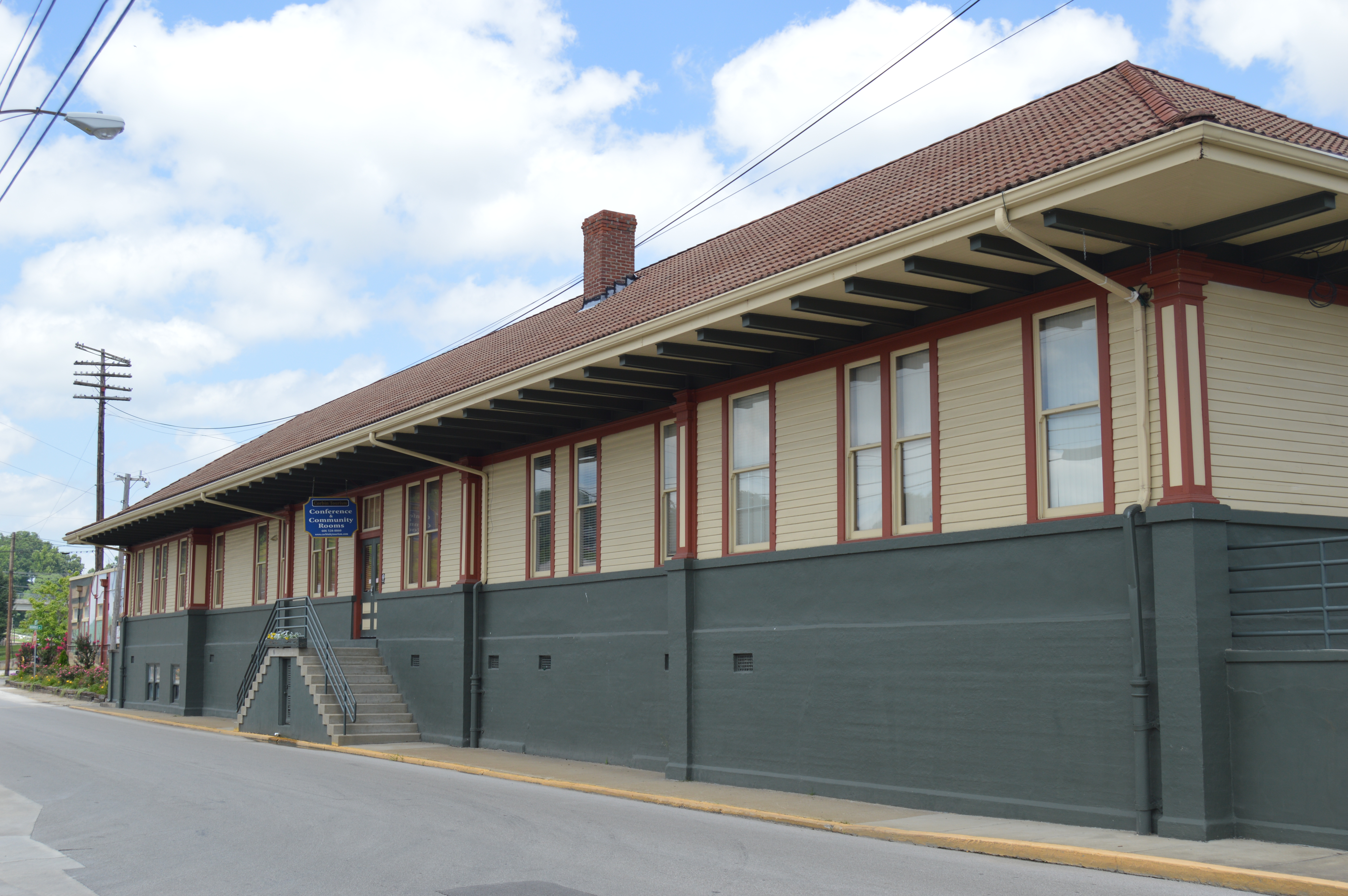
- Location: Lynn Ave. Corbin, Kentucky
- Coordinates: 36°56′51″N 84°05′44″W
- NRHP reference No.: 78001414
- Added to NRHP: June 15, 1978

Corbin station is a former railway station in Corbin, Kentucky. The Louisville and Nashville Railroad reached Corbin in 1882. The railroad division's head offices were moved into the building in 1926, which required renovating the telephone system. By the end of passenger service in 1968, fewer than one person per day boarded in Corbin. The city acquired the station and property by 1977. It was added to the National Register of Historic Places on June 15, 1978. The station was planned to be utilized as a museum in 2015.

Preceding station	Louisville and Nashville Railroad	Following station
London toward Cincinnati	Cincinnati – Atlanta	Williamsburg toward Atlanta
