= Downtown Hartford Historic District =

Historic district in Kentucky, United States

- U.S. National Register of Historic Places
- U.S. Historic district
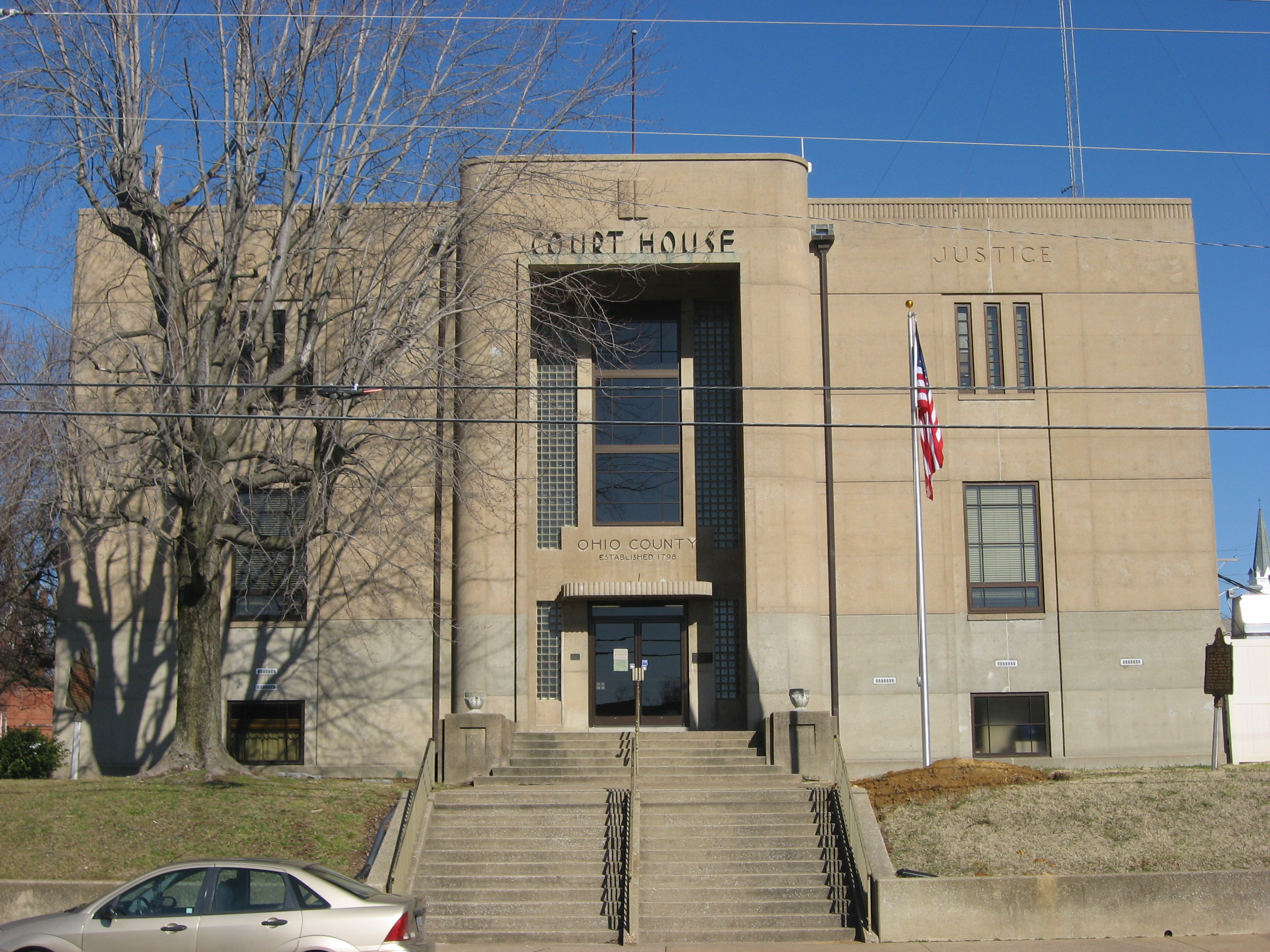

- Location within Kentucky Location within the United States
- Location: Roughly 100 and 200 blocks Main St. and Courthouse Sq., and 100 blocks E. Union & E. Washington Streets, Hartford, Kentucky
- Coordinates: 37°27′04″N 86°54′32″W
- Area: 4 acres (1.6 ha)
- Built: 1937
- Architect: Roberts, Walter Scott; McClellan, W.C.
- Architectural style: Late 19th And Early 20th Century American Movements, Modern Movement, Italianate
- NRHP reference No.: 88002760
- Added to NRHP: December 12, 1988

The Downtown Hartford Historic District in Hartford, Kentucky is a 4 acres (1.6 ha) historic district which was listed on the National Register of Historic Places in 1988.

It is roughly the 100 and 200 blocks of Main St. and Courthouse Sq., and 100 blocks E. Union & E. Washington Streets. The district includes the Ohio County Courthouse and its jail, and the Hartford city hall, among its 16 contributing buildings.

The Ohio County Courthouse "is the most imposing building" in the district. It is a two-story concrete building designed by Walter Scott Roberts and built during 1940–1943. It is the fourth courthouse in the location.
