= Whitesburg Historic District =

Historic district in Kentucky, United States

- U.S. National Register of Historic Places
- U.S. Historic district
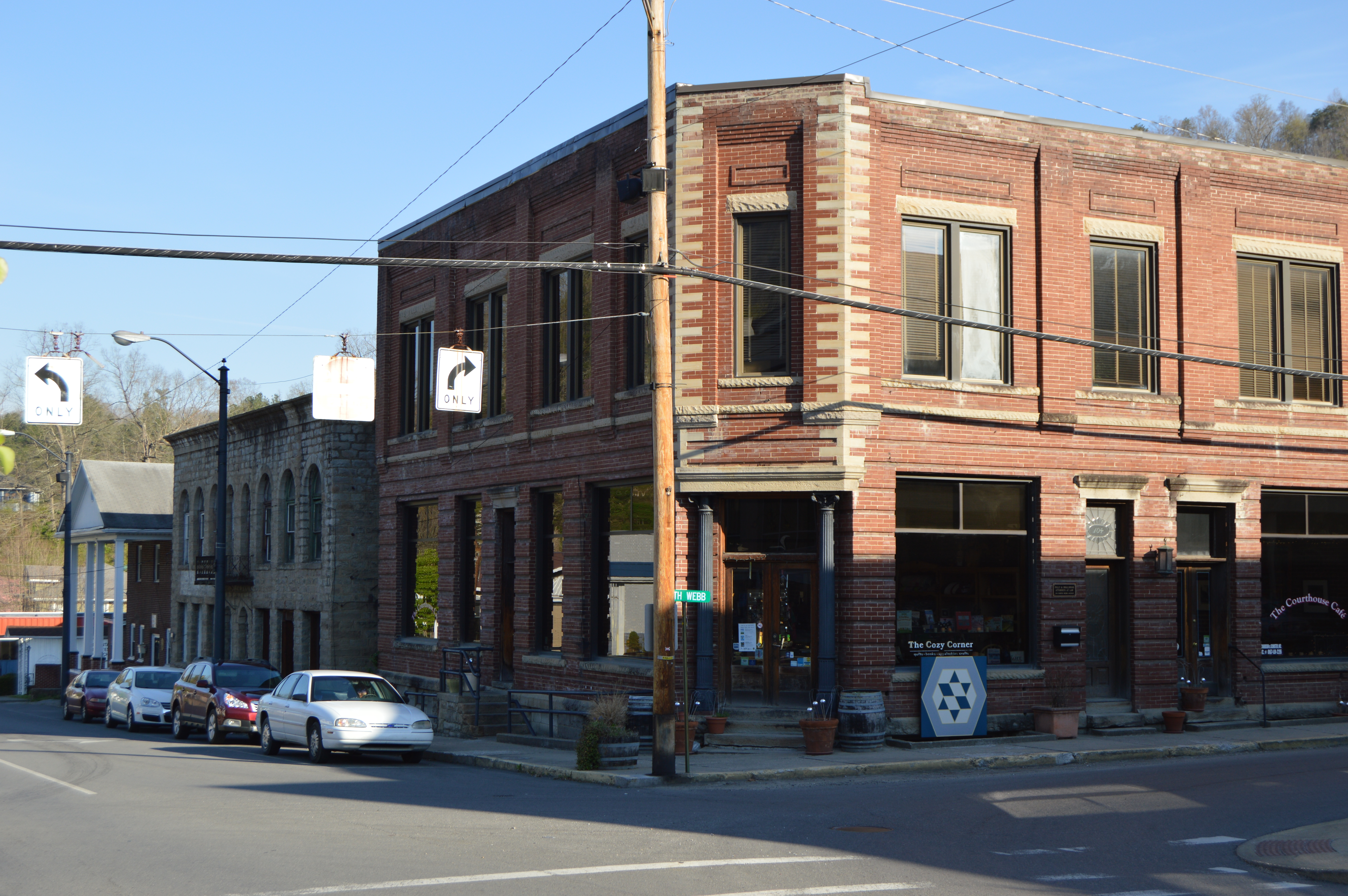

- Location within Kentucky Location within the United States
- Location: Portions of Main Sts., Broadway, Bentley, Webb, and Hayes Aves., Church, Pine, Cowan, Madison Sts, River Rd., Hazard Rd, Whitesburg, Kentucky
- Coordinates: 37°07′04″N 82°49′31″W
- Area: 82 acres (33 ha)
- Built: 1911
- Built by: Joseph Palumbo, et.al.
- Architectural style: Gothic Revival, Bungalow/American Craftsman
- NRHP reference No.: 06000813
- Added to NRHP: September 12, 2006

The Whitesburg Historic District, in Whitesburg in Letcher County, Kentucky, is an 82 acres (33 ha) historic district which was listed on the National Register of Historic Places in 2006. It included 86 contributing buildings, four contributing structures, and a contributing site.

It includes parts of Main St., Broadway, Bentley, Webb, and Hayes Aves., Church, Pine, Cowan, Madison Sts., River Rd., and Hazard Rd. in Whitesburg. Altogether it includes 126 contributing and non-contributing resources.

It includes:

- numerous residences
- two churches
- former soft drink bottling plant
- two bridges
- various commercial buildings
- Letcher County Courthouse (non-contributing)
