= George Short House =

Historic house in Kentucky, United States

- U.S. National Register of Historic Places
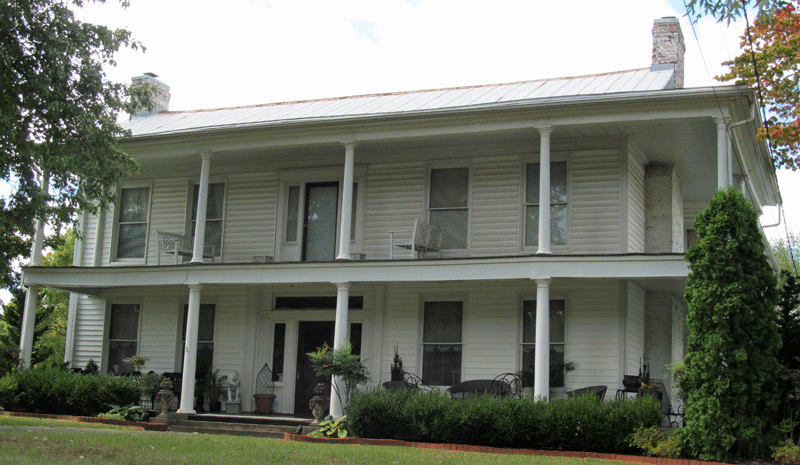
- The George Short House in 2013

- Location within Kentucky Location within the United States
- Location: 151 N. Main St., Greenville, Kentucky
- Coordinates: 37°12′11″N 87°10′45″W
- Area: 0.3 acres (0.12 ha)
- Built: 1840s
- MPS: Greenville Kentucky MRA (AD)
- NRHP reference No.: 80001661
- Added to NRHP: September 15, 1980

The George Short House is a historic house located at 151 N. Main St. in Greenville, Kentucky. Built in the 1840s, the house is the oldest remaining home in Greenville and one of fewer than ten in the city from before the Civil War. The Greek Revival home features a two-story porch supported by columns, a transom and sidelights alongside the front door, and brick chimneys on either end of the structure.

The house's first owner, George Washington Short, was a wealthy businessman who was involved with the local tobacco industry. Short built the house in an attempt to impress Tabitha Brank, a woman from Greenville who had rejected his marriage proposal. The house failed to change Brank's mind, and Short died a bachelor. Short never lived in his new house.

The house was added to the National Register of Historic Places on September 15, 1980. It is also included in the North Main Street Historic District, which is itself on the National Register.
