= Robert Thomas House =

Historic house in Kentucky, United States

- U.S. National Register of Historic Places
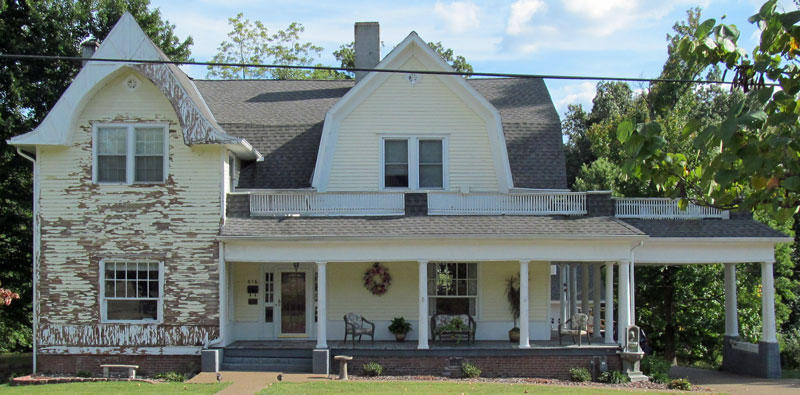
- The Robert Thomas House in 2013

- Location within Kentucky Location within the United States
- Location: 516 Broad St., Central City, Kentucky
- Coordinates: 37°17′45″N 87°7′5″W
- Area: 3.5 acres (1.4 ha)
- Built: 1899
- Architectural style: Dutch Colonial Revival
- NRHP reference No.: 90001833
- Added to NRHP: December 6, 1990

The Robert Thomas House is a historic house located at 516 Broad St. in Central City, Kentucky. The house was built in 1899 as a model home for an exhibit at the St. Louis World's Fair. Robert Y. Thomas and his family purchased the home and two other model homes from the display; the three homes were moved to Central City in 1904. Thomas, who later served in the U.S. House of Representatives, lived in the house, which he considered the "nicest of the three", until 1917. The Dutch Colonial Revival home features a gambrel roof, a front porch supported by Tuscan columns, and a balustrade along the roof of the porch. It is the only extant Dutch Colonial Revival building in Central City.

The house was added to the National Register of Historic Places on December 6, 1990.
