= Old Muhlenberg County Jail =

- U.S. National Register of Historic Places
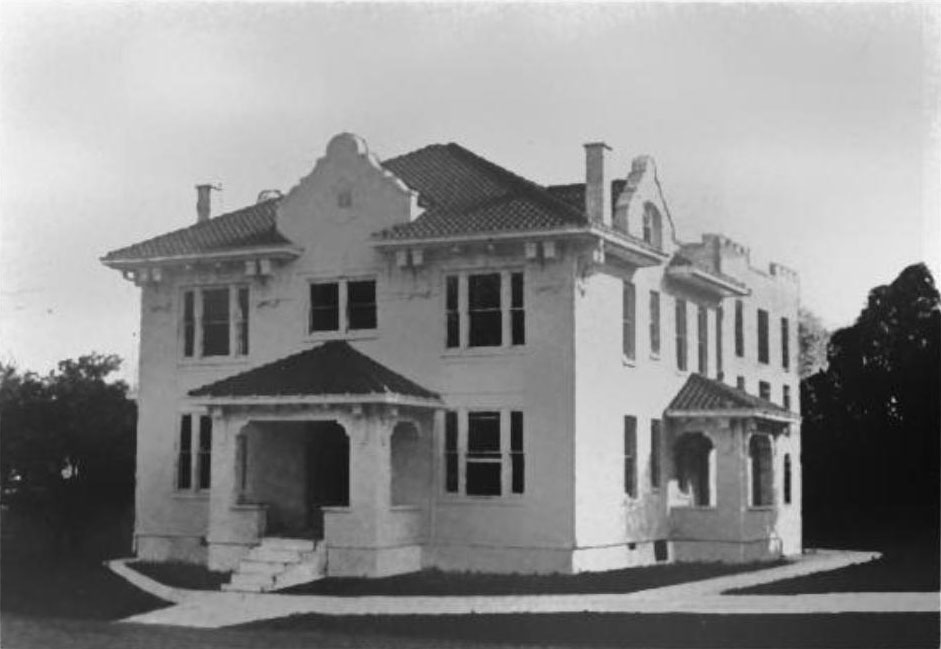
- The Old Muhlenberg County Jail and jailer's residence circa 1913

- Location within Kentucky Location within the United States
- Location: Court Row, Greenville, Kentucky
- Coordinates: 37°12′0″N 87°10′40″W
- Area: 0.2 acres (0.081 ha)
- Built: 1912
- Architectural style: Mission Revival
- MPS: Greenville Kentucky MRA
- NRHP reference No.: 85001901
- Added to NRHP: August 15, 1985

The Old Muhlenberg County Jail is a historic jail located on Court Row in Greenville, Kentucky. Built in 1912, the jail was the third used in Greenville. The stucco building was designed in the Mission Revival style. Its design features a red tile roof, a Mission-style dormer with a quatrefoil vent, and porches with hipped tile roofs over the entrances on three sides.

The jail was added to the National Register of Historic Places on August 15, 1985.
