= Modern Automotive District =

- U.S. National Register of Historic Places
- U.S. Historic district
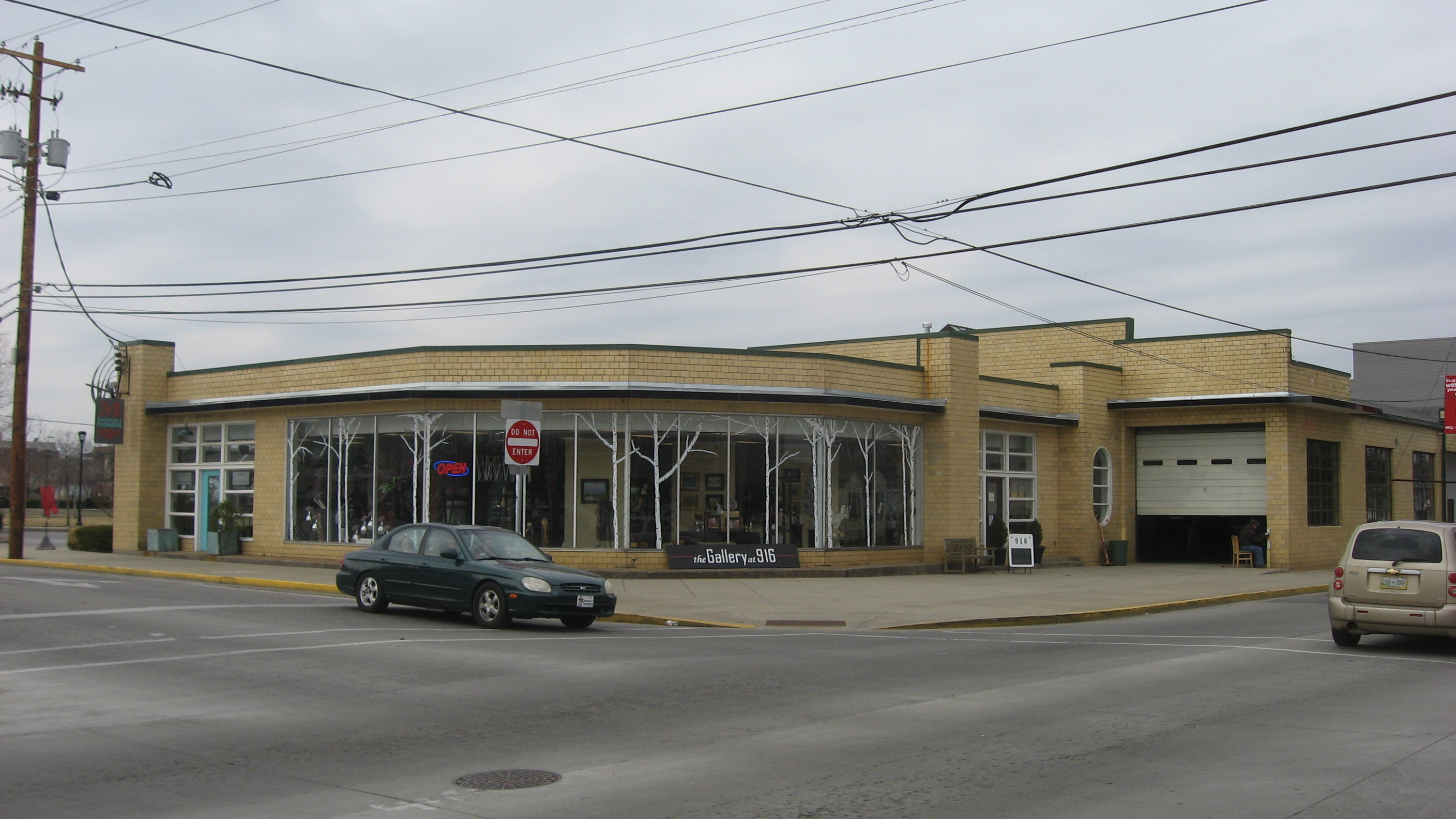

- Location within Kentucky Location within the United States
- Location: 538 State, 600 State, 601 State St., Bowling Green, Kentucky
- Coordinates: 36°59′43″N 86°26′13″W
- Area: 1.7 acres (0.69 ha)
- Built: 1948
- Architect: James Ingram
- Architectural style: Moderne, International
- NRHP reference No.: 06000809
- Added to NRHP: September 15, 2006

The Modern Automotive District is a 1.7 acres (0.69 ha) historic district in Bowling Green, Kentucky which was listed on the National Register of Historic Places in 2006.

It includes three contributing buildings on the Dixie Highway:

- Galloway Farm Equipment Company, at 538 State,
- Hardcastle Filling Station, at 600 State, and
- Galloway Motor Company, at 601 State St.

The two Galloway buildings were designed by architect James Ingram.
