= Garrett Coliseum =

Multi-purpose arena in Montgomery, Alabama

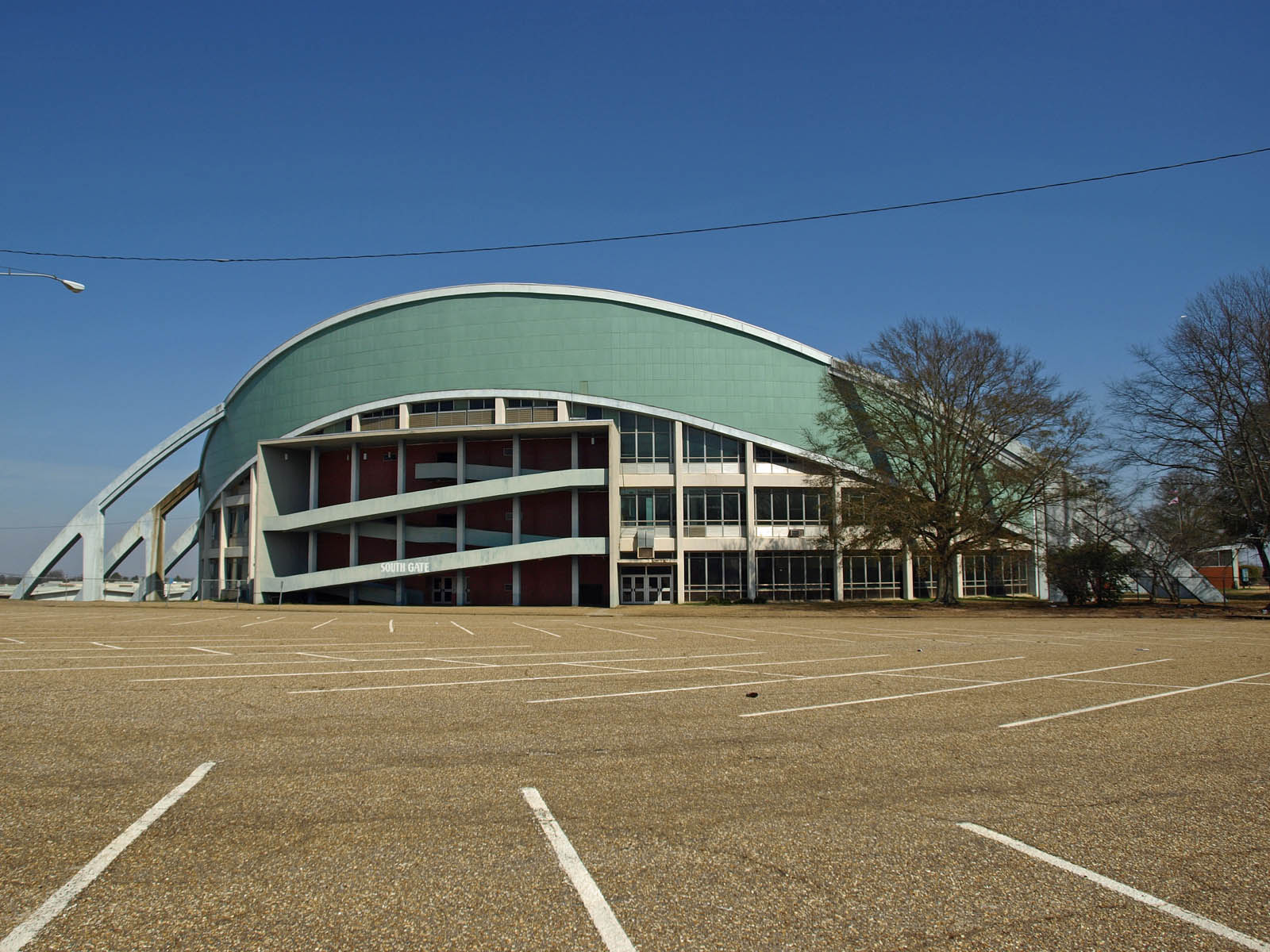
- Interactive map of Garrett Coliseum
- Location: Montgomery, Alabama, United States
- Coordinates: 32.402995°N 86.2713°W
- Owner: Alabama Department of Agriculture
- Capacity: 12,500

Construction
- Built: 1951
- Architect: Sherlock, Smith & Adams

Tenants
- Montgomery Bears (AIFA) (2007); Montgomery Catfish (AAL) (2027–present)

The Garrett Coliseum is a 12,500-seat multi-purpose arena in Montgomery, Alabama, United States. The arena is the centerpiece of the Alabama Agricultural Center, home to the Alabama National Fair. It was built in 1951 and named after W. W. Garrett, the first chairman of the Alabama Agricultural Board. The coliseum's first event was a concert by Hank Williams. In 2007, it was home to the Montgomery Bears of the American Indoor Football Association. The arena contains 8,500 permanent seats and can seat up to 10,500 for end-stage shows, 12,500 for boxing, wrestling and center-stage concerts. The Garrett Coliseum Complex is also home to the official state horse show, by Law on the books the Alabama Open Horsemans Association State Championship Horse Show, which is held every year on Labor Day Weekend.

Garrett Coliseum is unique among indoor arenas for its bandstand which is located at the coliseum's stage end. The Coliseum also contains a 33,600-square-foot arena floor. Adjacent venues in the Alabama National Fairgrounds include the Crawford Arena with 26,243 square feet of space; Teague Arena with 7800 square feet of space; a 14,400-square-foot Exhibit Building, and the 10,500-square-foot Homer Lewis Building.
