= Sears, Roebuck and Company Store (Louisville, Kentucky) =

- U.S. National Register of Historic Places
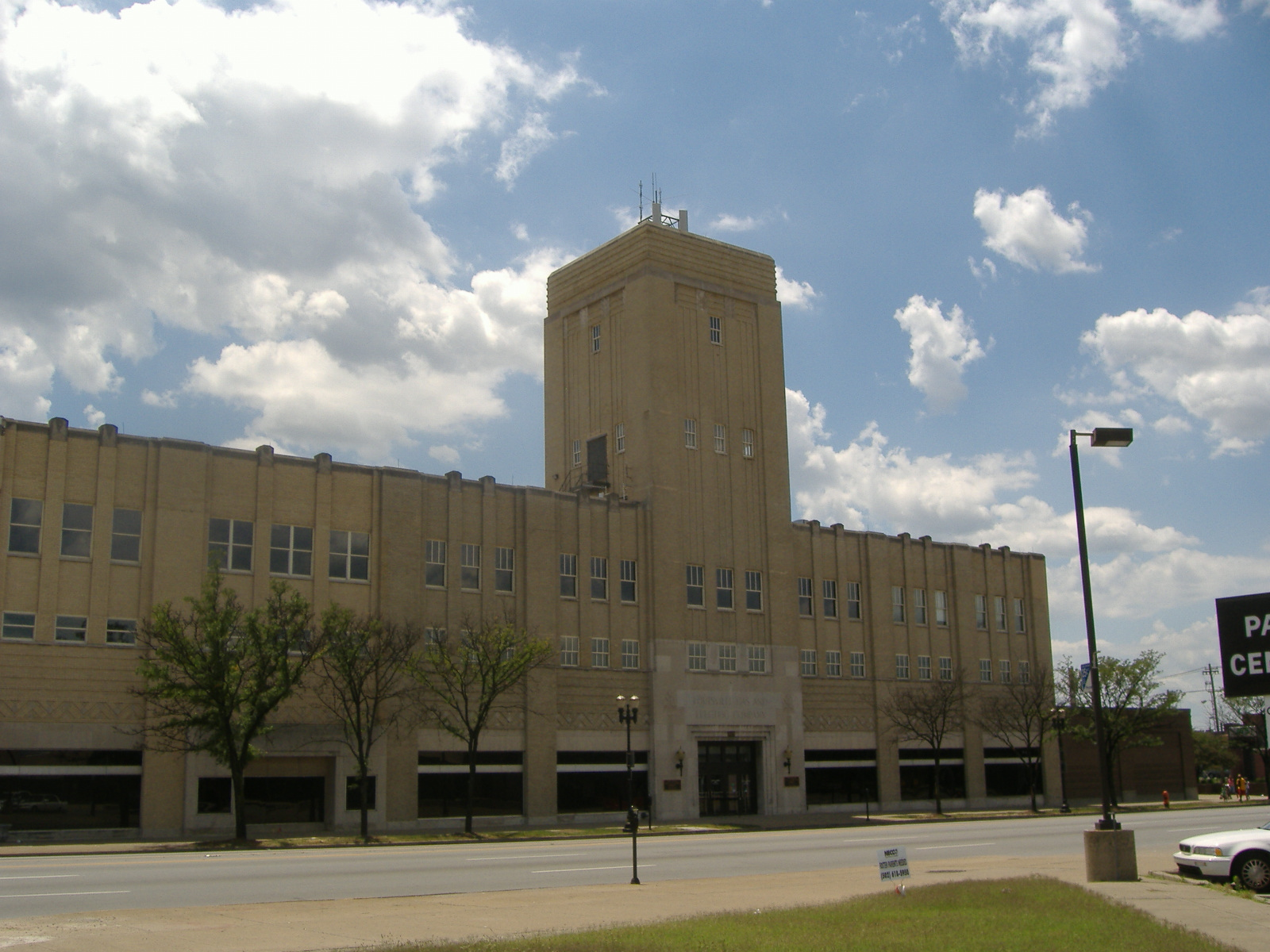

- Location within Kentucky Location within the United States
- Location: Louisville, Kentucky
- Coordinates: 38°14′46″N 85°45′56″W
- Built: 1928, 1946
- Architect: Nimmons, Carr & Wright
- Architectural style: Art Deco
- NRHP reference No.: 83002729
- Added to NRHP: February 18, 1983

The Sears, Roebuck and Company Store, at 800 West Broadway in Louisville, Kentucky, is a building which was listed on the National Register of Historic Places in 1983.

It was deemed notable as "one of few structures in Louisville and the only major commercial/retail building constructed in the Art Deco style. Built in 1928, the structure incorporates features characteristic of the style, including strong vertical elements and geometric patterns in the detailing."
