= J. A. Gilman House =

Historic house in Kentucky, United States

- U.S. National Register of Historic Places
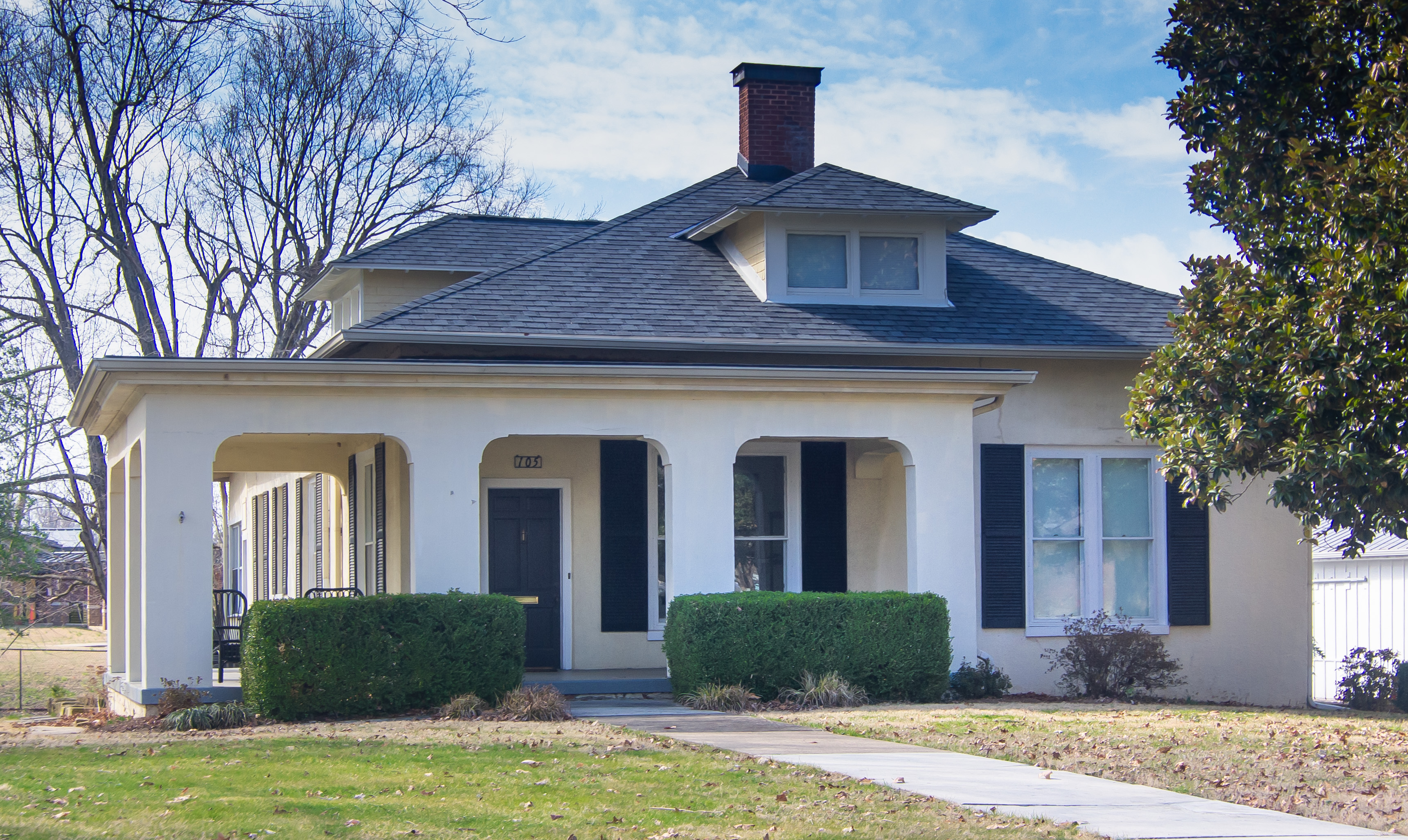
- House in 2021

- Location within Kentucky Location within the United States
- Location: 105 Paradise St., Greenville, Kentucky
- Coordinates: 37.20462°N 87.17340°W
- Area: .79 acres (0.32 ha)
- Built: c.1855, 1912
- Architectural style: Mission Revival
- MPS: Greenville Kentucky MRA
- NRHP reference No.: 100005194
- Added to NRHP: July 14, 2020

The J. A. Gilman Residence is a Mission Revival style home in the town of Greenville, Kentucky. The residence was constructed circa 1855 and originally served as the residence for Professor William Green, President of the Greenville Female Academy. Established in 1850, the Greenville Female Academy was the first higher educational institution for women in Muhlenberg County, and it consisted of numerous buildings, including classrooms, a dormitory, and a residence for Professor Green. In 1912, the residence was purchased by J. A. Gilman, a local civil engineer, and remodeled extensively in Mission Revival style. Today the J. A. Gilman residence is a well preserved and rare surviving example of Mission Revival architecture in the region.

The house was added to the National Register of Historic Places on July 14, 2020.

The house was deemed significant as "a rare surviving example of an architectural style that enjoyed a relatively brief period of popularity in the region in the early 20th Century."

Other examples of Mission Revival style in Muhlenberg County are:

- Duncan House (Greenville, Kentucky), included in the South Cherry Street Historic District (Greenville, Kentucky) (refnum 85001905) and
- Muhlenberg County Jail (refnum 85001901)

== Thistle Cottage ==
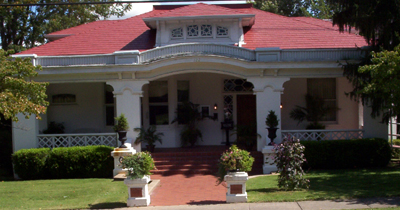
Duncan House aka Thistle Cottage

At the time of its construction in 1855, the residence was a brick cottage on the grounds of the Greenville Female Academy, and it originally served as the residence of William Green, President of the Academy. In 1912 the residence was dramatically remodeled by J.A. Gilman, a local civil engineer. J.A. Gilman's remodeling transformed the home from a mid-19th Century brick cottage into an early 20th Century Mission Revival style residence. From 1890 to 1920, Mission architecture styles flourished in California and the American Southwest. Modeled after the Spanish missions throughout California, Mission Revival architecture incorporated stylistic elements such as stuccoed exteriors, wide arcaded porches with arched columns, Mission-like bell towers, and quatrefoil windows. The style was extremely popular in California, and although scattered examples can be found throughout the United States during the final decade of the style's heyday, Mission Revival architecture never became a common style in the Eastern United States.

== Architecture ==
In Greenville, it appears that Mission Revival style experienced a very brief period of popularity with the construction or remodeling of three prominent buildings in Mission Revival style in a single year. In 1912, the J. A. Gilman residence was remodeled in Mission Revival style, the Duncan House was constructed in Mission/Prairie-style (Figure 16) and the Muhlenberg County Jail was constructed in Mission Revival style (Figure 17). Other buildings, such as the Cumberland Presbyterian Church (now demolished) (Figure 18), originally constructed in 1892, had an early 20th Century stucco exterior, but the building bore no other Mission Revival style elements.

Both the Duncan House (NRIS#85001905) and the Muhlenberg County Jail (NRIS#85001901) were listed on the National Register of Historic Places, and the Muhlenberg County Jail was removed after being demolished in 2000. Today, the J. A. Gilman residence is one of only two genuine Mission Revival-style buildings in the city, making it a rare surviving example of this architectural style."
