= Greenville City Hall (Greenville, Alabama) =

- U.S. National Register of Historic Places
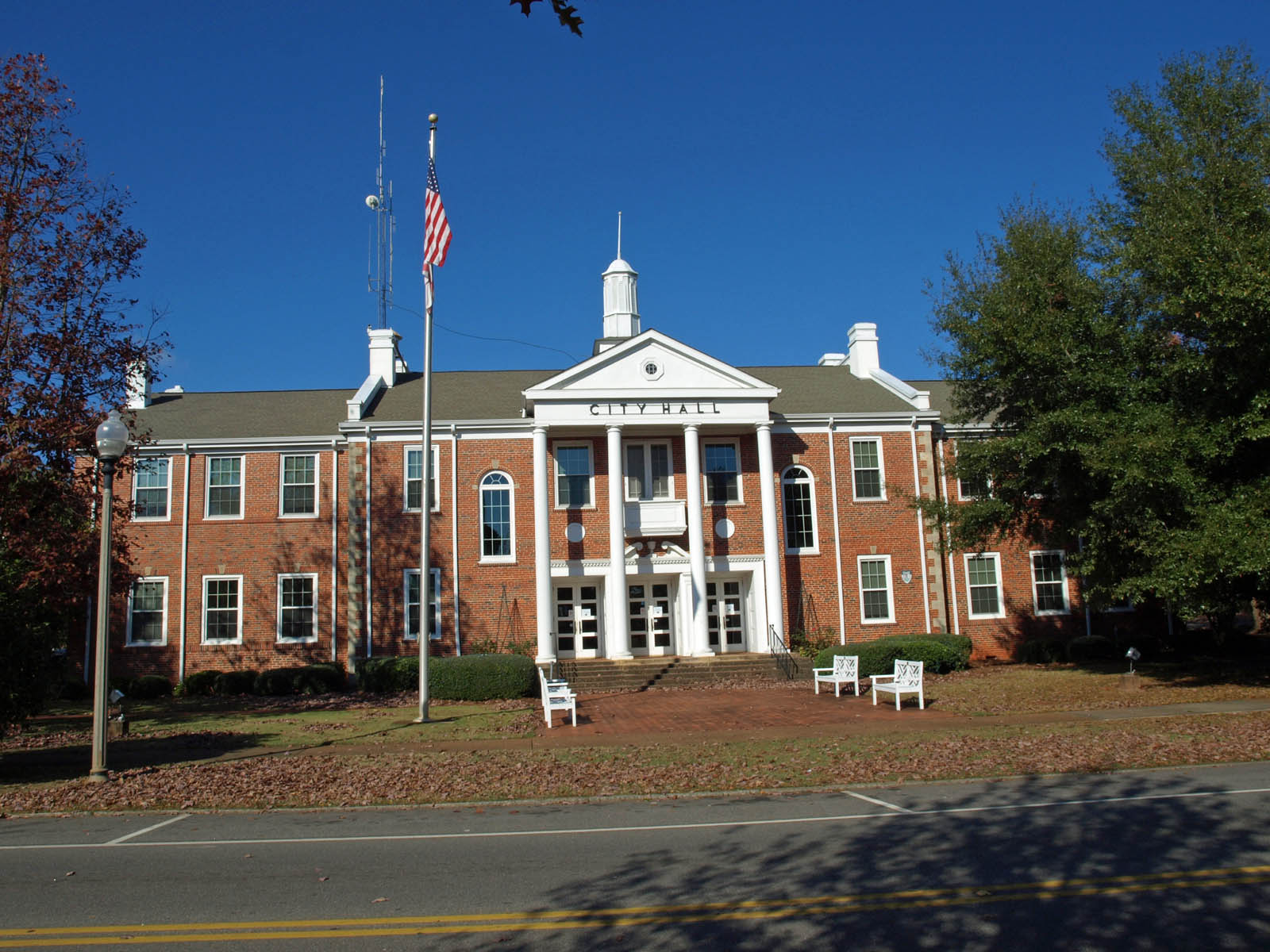
- The building in November 2013

- Location within Alabama Location within the United States
- Location: E. Commerce St., Greenville, Alabama
- Coordinates: 31°49′48″N 86°37′22″W
- Area: less than one acre
- Built: 1937
- Architect: Moreland G. Smith
- Architectural style: Colonial Revival
- MPS: Greenville MRA
- NRHP reference No.: 86001807
- Added to NRHP: November 4, 1986

Greenville City Hall in Greenville, Alabama, United States, is a historic city hall. The building was designed by Montgomery architect Moreland G. Smith, and built in 1936–37 by workers from the Works Progress Administration. The building is designed in a Colonial Revival style with Palladian influences, a popular style in the 1930s due to the recent restoration of Colonial Williamsburg. It was built on the site of a grammar school that was originally built in the 1890s, but burned in the early 1920s and again in 1927. The building is constructed of brick, with a full-height portico around the main entry. Each window on the first floor is topped with an ashlar keystone. The corners of the main block are adorned with stone quoins. The building was listed on the National Register of Historic Places in 1986.
