= Rice Tobacco Factory =

- U.S. National Register of Historic Places
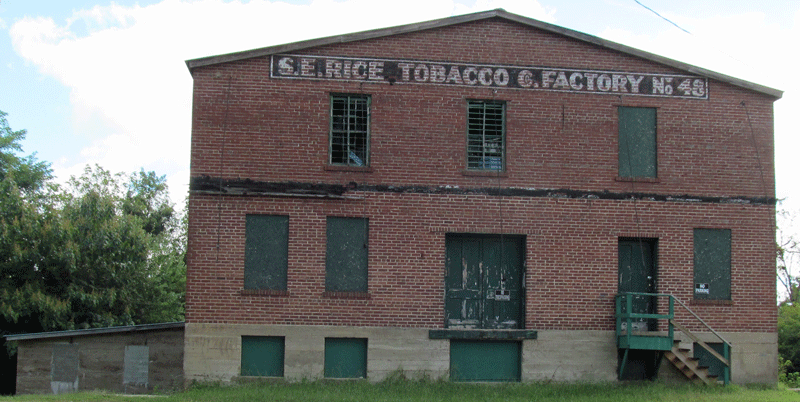
- The Rice Tobacco Factory in 2013

- Location within Kentucky Location within the United States
- Location: 112 N. Cherry St., Greenville, Kentucky
- Coordinates: 37°12′8″N 87°10′50″W
- Area: 1.4 acres (0.57 ha)
- Built: 1922
- MPS: Greenville Kentucky MRA
- NRHP reference No.: 85001902
- Added to NRHP: August 15, 1985

The Rice Tobacco Factory is a historic tobacco factory located at 112 N. Cherry St. in Greenville, Kentucky. The factory was built in 1922 by S.E. Rice, whose S.E. Rice Company was founded in 1904. Tobacco had been Muhlenberg County's largest cash crop throughout the 19th century, and the region became known for its variety, called "Greenville Tobacco". The Rice factory, however, was the last building built in Greenville for tobacco production. It is now the only surviving commercial building connected to the city's tobacco industry. The property was acquired in March, 2018, and the new owner is in the process of a historic rehabilitation of the building.

The factory was added to the National Register of Historic Places on August 15, 1985.
