= Irvine Historic Business District =

Historic district in Kentucky, United States

- U.S. National Register of Historic Places
- U.S. Historic district
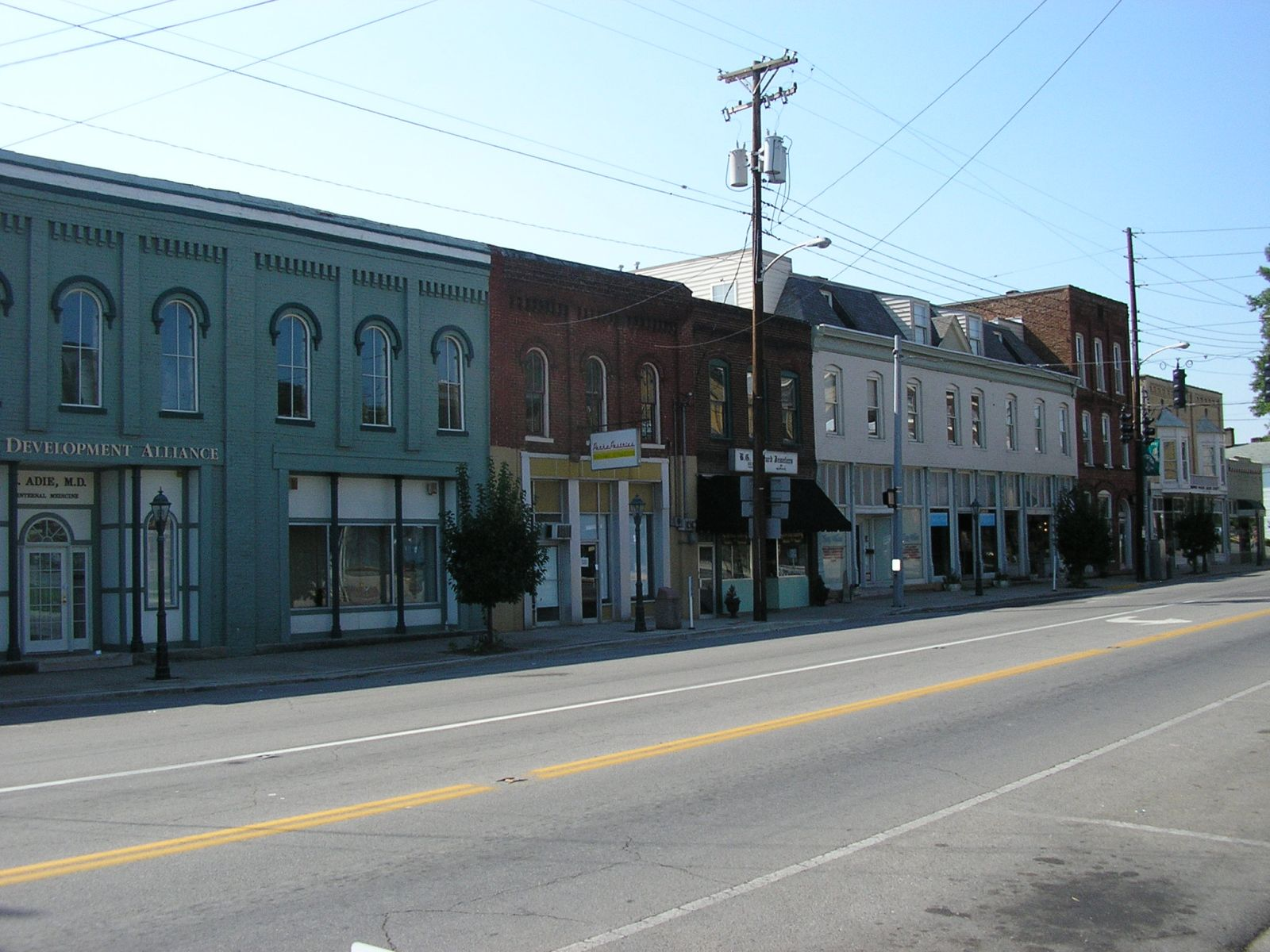

- Location within Kentucky Location within the United States
- Location: Roughly the jct. of KY 52 and KY 89, Irvine, Kentucky
- Coordinates: 37°41′59″N 83°58′30″W
- Area: 7 acres (2.8 ha)
- Built: 1915
- Architectural style: Late Victorian, Late 19th And 20th Century Revivals, et.al.
- NRHP reference No.: 00000866
- Added to NRHP: August 2, 2000

The Irvine Historic Business District in Irvine, Kentucky is a historic district which was listed on the National Register of Historic Places in 2000.

It is located at roughly the junction of Kentucky Route 52 and Kentucky Route 89

It included 28 contributing buildings and four non-contributing buildings and sites.

It includes:

- Estill County Courthouse (1939)
- Wallace Hotel / Citizens Voice & Times (1922), 108 Court St.
- Mack Theatre (1930s), 110 Main
- more
