= North Main Street Historic District (Greenville, Kentucky) =

Historic district in Kentucky, United States

- U.S. National Register of Historic Places
- U.S. Historic district
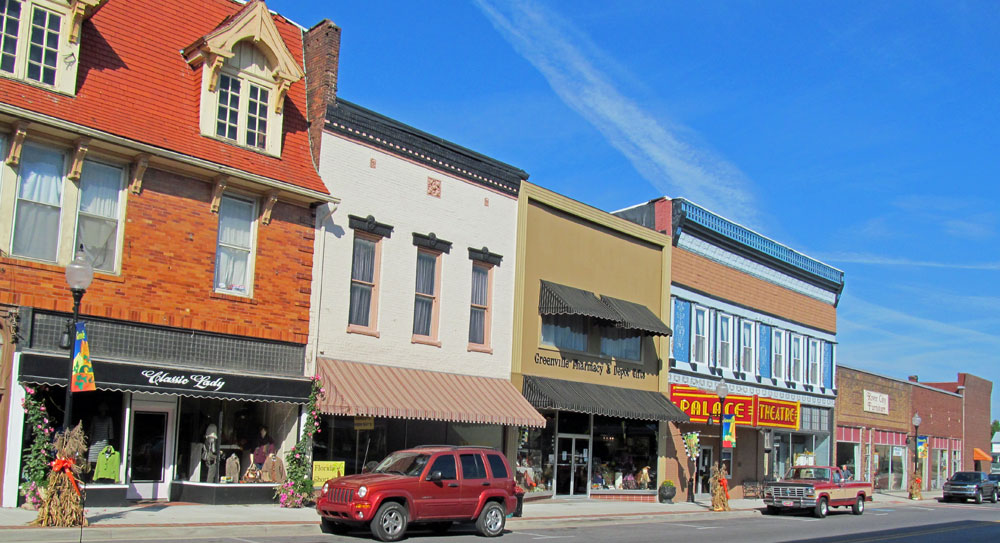
- The 100 block of North Main Street

- Location within Kentucky Location within the United States
- Location: 100 and 200 blocks of N. Main St., Greenville, Kentucky
- Coordinates: 37°12′14″N 87°10′44″W
- Area: 15.7 acres (6.4 ha)
- Architectural style: Colonial Revival, Bungalow, Queen Anne, Neoclassical
- MPS: Greenville Kentucky MRA
- NRHP reference No.: 85001904
- Added to NRHP: August 15, 1985

The North Main Street Historic District is a historic district located along the 100 and 200 blocks of North Main Street in Greenville, Kentucky. The district includes 22 buildings, 20 of which are contributing buildings to the district's historic status. The primarily residential district is located just north of downtown Greenville. The houses within the district were mainly built in the early 20th century and designed in the Colonial Revival, Bungalow, and Queen Anne styles; an exception to this pattern is the George Short House, which was built in 1841 and is the oldest surviving house in the city. The district also includes the United Methodist Church, a Neoclassical church built in 1921.

The district was added to the National Register of Historic Places on August 15, 1985.
