= South Cherry Street Historic District (Greenville, Kentucky) =

Historic district in Kentucky, United States

- U.S. National Register of Historic Places
- U.S. Historic district
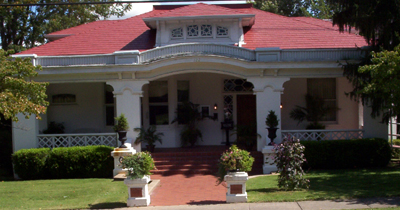
- Thistle Cottage at 122 South Cherry Street

- Location within Kentucky Location within the United States
- Location: Roughly bounded by S. Cherry, Hopkinsville, W. Main Cross and N. Cherry Sts., Greenville, Kentucky
- Coordinates: 37°11′59″N 87°10′50″W
- Area: 11.5 acres (4.7 ha)
- Architectural style: Greek Revival, Colonial Revival, Queen Anne, Beaux-Arts, Bungalow, Gothic, Romanesque
- MPS: Greenville Kentucky MRA
- NRHP reference No.: 85001905
- Added to NRHP: August 15, 1985

The South Cherry Street Historic District is a historic district mainly located along the 100 block of South Cherry Street in Greenville, Muhlenberg County, Kentucky. The primarily residential district, which also includes properties on several neighboring streets, contains twenty-three buildings, eighteen of which are contributing buildings to the district's historical significance. The first house in the district was built in 1842 by Jonathan Short. Short was followed by several others in the 1840s and 1850s as Cherry Street became the favored neighborhood of Greenville's prosperous merchants. The early homes in the district were all designed in a vernacular Greek Revival style.

During Greenville's economic boom after 1871, more homes were built in the district; most of the newer homes were designed in the Colonial Revival and Queen Anne styles. Two churches were constructed in the area in the 1890s: the Gothic Revival Colored Baptist Church and the Romanesque Revival Cumberland Presbyterian Church.

Three of the district's homes were built in the early 1900s as a result of a rivalry between the Duncan and Wickliffe families, who both wished to prove that they were wealthier and of higher status than the other. After the Duncan family built a Queen Anne home at 117 South Cherry in 1907, the Wickliffes constructed an $8000 Beaux-Arts house at 112 Hopkinsville Street the following year. The Duncans responded by building the $10,000 Thistle Cottage at 122 South Cherry Street, which featured decorative woodwork and stained glass windows.

Even more houses were built in the district between 1910 and 1930; these later additions were mainly Colonial Revival homes and bungalows. Construction in the district largely ended after 1930, however, leaving the district primarily composed of historic homes. The district was added to the National Register of Historic Places on August 15, 1985.

Two houses in the district were built by the Duncan family and might be known as "Duncan House". One is at 117 South Cherry. The other Duncan House, at 122 South Cherry, became the Duncan Center Museum & Art Gallery until renamed to "Thistle Cottage". This latter one is one of few examples of Mission Revival architecture in Muhlenberg County; the J.A. Gilman House, also in Greenville and separately NRHP-listed, is another.

== Gallery ==
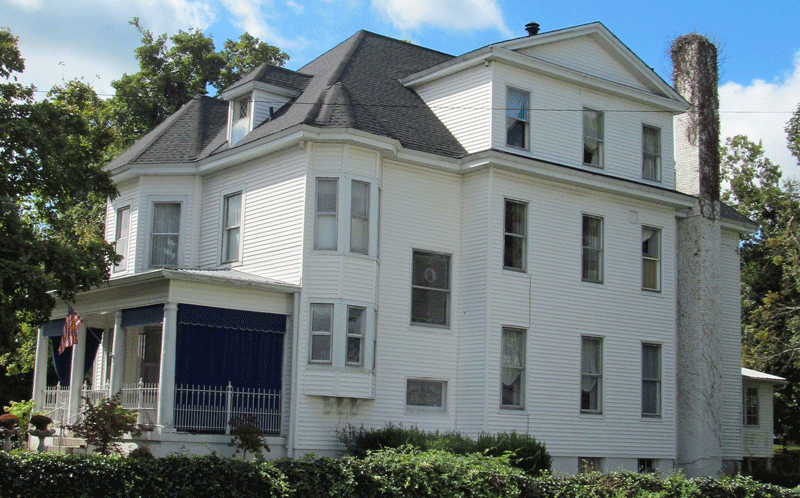
The Duncan House at 117 South Cherry Street

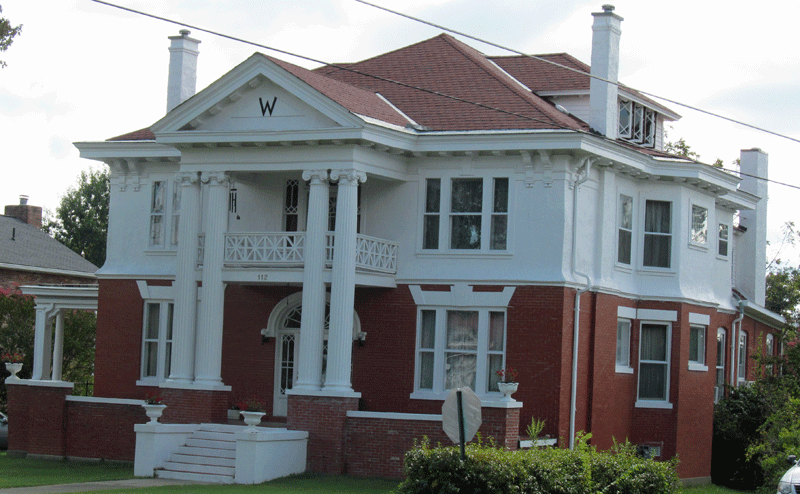
The Wickliffe House at 112 Hopkinsville Street

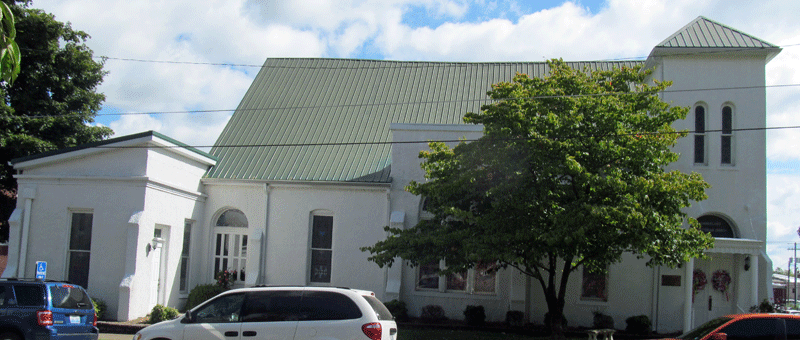
The Cumberland Presbyterian Church, built in the 1890s
