= Lane Theater =

- U.S. National Register of Historic Places
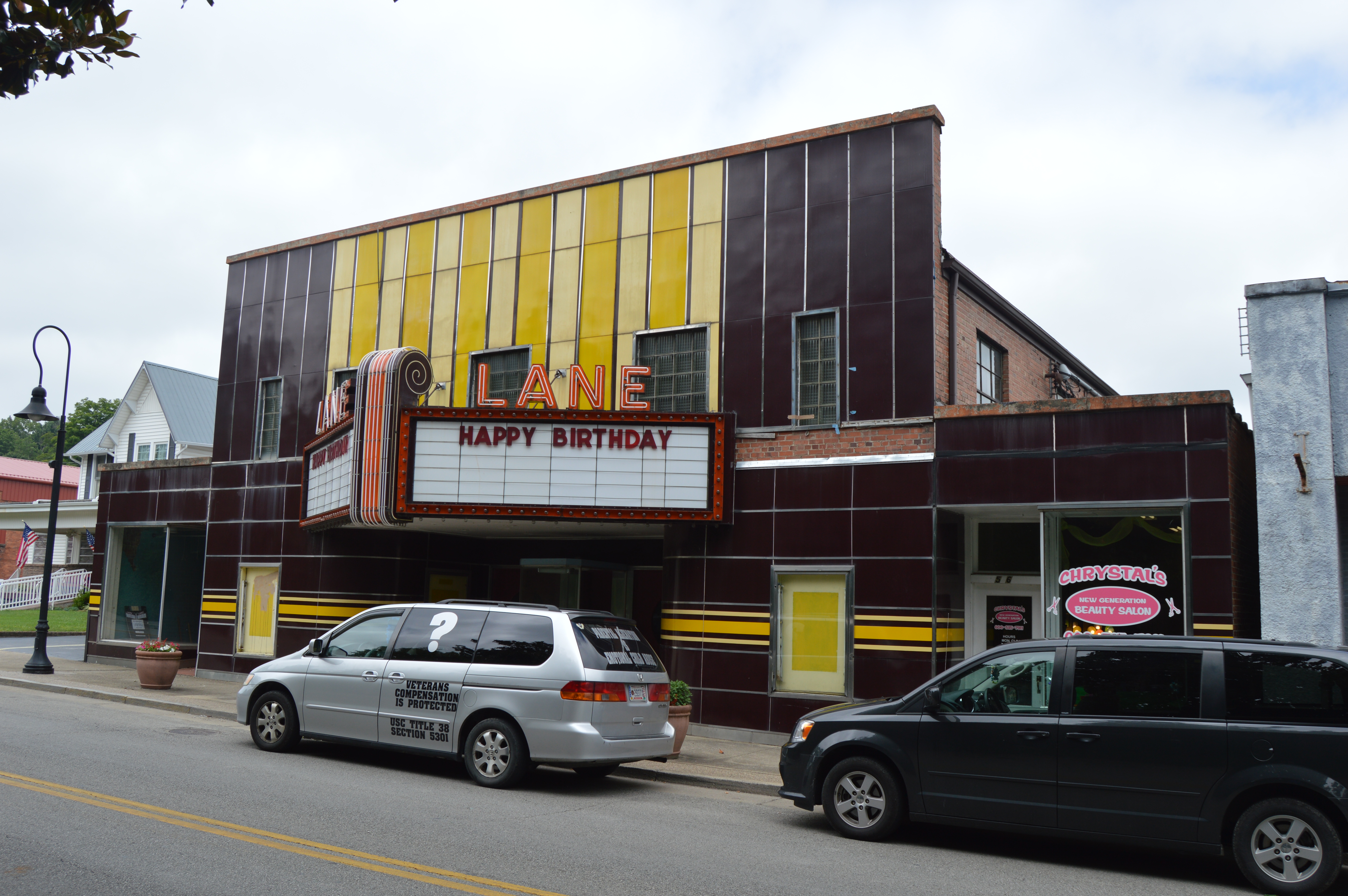
- Location: 508 Main St, Williamsburg, Kentucky
- Coordinates: 36°44′28″N 78°09′43″W
- Area: 5 acres (2.0 ha)
- Built: 1948
- Built by: White, A.L.
- Architectural style: Art Deco
- NRHP reference No.: 04001255
- Added to NRHP: November 26, 2004

The Lane Theater in Williamsburg, Kentucky, located at 508 Main St., is an Art Deco-style building which was built in 1948. It was listed on the National Register of Historic Places in 2004.

The first-floor level of the facade "is covered in yellow and brown horizontal striped panels of enameled metal, accented with chrome"; the facade further above "is faced in vertical yellow and brown striped panels of enameled metal surrounding second floor glass block windows."
