= Greenville Commercial Historic District (Greenville, Kentucky) =

Historic district in Kentucky, United States

- U.S. National Register of Historic Places
- U.S. Historic district
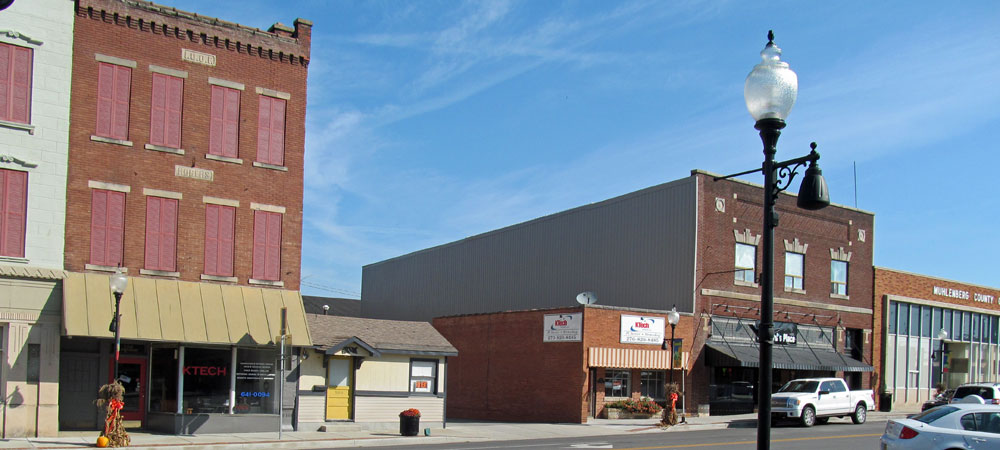
- The 100 block of East Main Cross

- Location within Kentucky Location within the United States
- Location: 100 blocks of N. Main and E. Main Cross Sts., Greenville, Kentucky
- Coordinates: 37°12′5″N 87°10′44″W
- Area: 1.5 acres (0.61 ha)
- Architectural style: Beaux Arts, Art Deco, Italianate
- MPS: Greenville Kentucky MRA
- NRHP reference No.: 85001903
- Added to NRHP: August 15, 1985

The Greenville Commercial Historic District is a historic district located on two blocks of N. Main St. and E. Main Cross St. in Greenville, Kentucky. The district consists of thirteen commercial buildings, ten of which are contributing buildings. The buildings in the district are commercial buildings constructed in the late 19th and early 20th centuries. The oldest of the buildings are two Italianate buildings built in the 1870s. The district includes the First National Bank Building, a Beaux-Arts building constructed in 1901; a building at 121-123 N. Main with a metal facade and engaged columns; the Greenville Record building at 115 N. Main; Greenville's Odd Fellows hall at 103 E. Main Cross; and the Palace Theater at 121 N. Main.

The district was added to the National Register of Historic Places on August 15, 1985.
