= Greenville City Hall (Kentucky) =

- U.S. National Register of Historic Places
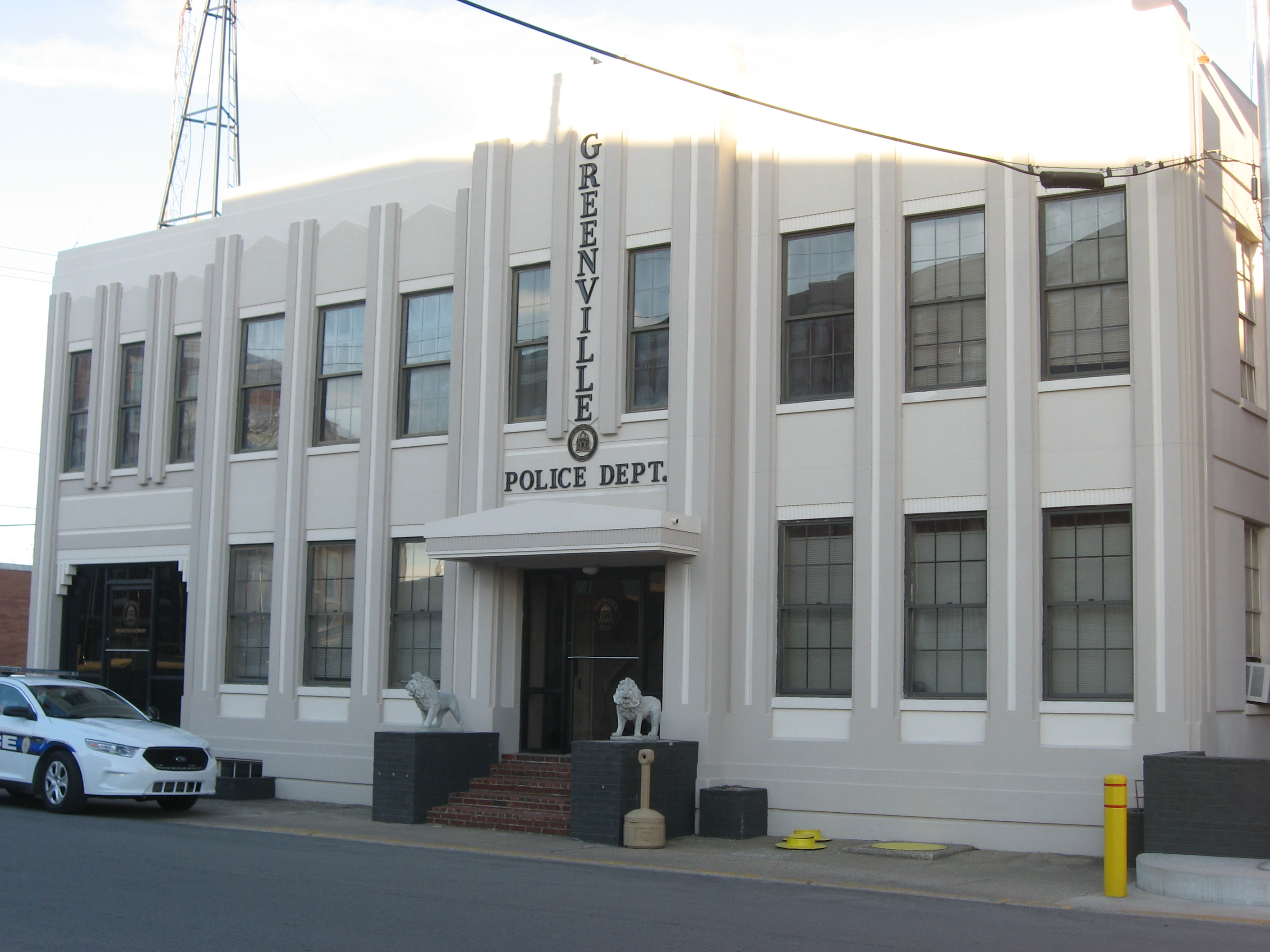
- Pictured in 2014, now the police station

- Location within Kentucky Location within the United States
- Location: Court Street, Greenville, Kentucky
- Coordinates: 37°12′0″N 87°10′39″W
- Area: 0.2 acres (0.081 ha)
- Built: 1940
- Architect: Works Progress Administration
- Architectural style: Art Deco
- MPS: Greenville Kentucky MRA
- NRHP reference No.: 85001906
- Added to NRHP: August 26, 1985

The Greenville City Hall, located on Court Street, is Greenville, Kentucky's city hall. The building was constructed in 1940 by the Works Progress Administration. The building, which was also designed by the WPA, is the only Art Deco building in Muhlenberg County. Its design features vertical piers, fluted pilasters, reverse crow-stepped ornamentation around the entrances, and chevron-shaped moldings on the second-floor windows.

The building was added to the National Register of Historic Places on August 26, 1985.
