= List of tornadoes in the outbreak and floods of April 2–7, 2025 =

From April 2–7, 2025, a devastating tornado outbreak took place across the Central United States.

== Confirmed tornadoes ==
Date	Total	EFU	EF0	EF1	EF2	EF3	EF4	EF5	Deaths	Injuries
April 2	75	1	10	41	21	2	0	0	0	16
April 3	22	0	10	6	2	4	0	0	7	22
April 4	7	0	1	4	2	0	0	0	0	1
April 5	25	0	7	15	3	0	0	0	0	5
April 6	19	0	3	11	5	0	0	0	1	0
April 7	9	0	4	5	0	0	0	0	0	0
Total	157	1	35	82	33	6	0	0	8	44

=== April 2 event ===
List of confirmed tornadoes – Wednesday, April 2, 2025 (Note: All dates are based on the local time zone where the tornado touched down; however, all times are in Coordinated Universal Time for consistency.)
EF#	Location	County / parish	State	Start coord.	Time (UTC)	Path length	Max. width
EF1	NW of Pawhuska	Osage	OK	36.764°N 96.448°W	10:13–10:18	3.7 mi (6.0 km)	250 yd (230 m)
EF1	Multiple power poles were snapped.						
EF1	NE of Turley to Owasso to Limestone	Tulsa, Rogers	OK	36.255°N 95.932°W	11:37–11:47	10.4 mi (16.7 km)	600 yd (550 m)
EF1	A high-end EF1 tornado developed west of US 75, damaging trees and industrial buildings. It then moved northeast into Owasso, affecting several neighborhoods where homes were damaged, trees were uprooted, and power poles were snapped. The tornado continued into Rogers county, damaging roofs and snapping large tree limbs before dissipating after it destroyed an outbuilding in Limestone.						
EFU	ENE of Butler	Bates	MO	38.3°N 94.27°W	12:02		
EFU	A tornado debris signature was noted on radar, but the area where it occurred was inaccessible, leading to an EFU rating.						
EF0	ENE of Butler to W of Johnstown	Bates	MO	38.2753°N 94.2358°W	12:02–12:11	7.5 mi (12.1 km)	50 yd (46 m)
EF0	This high-end EF0 tornado touched down in an open field, causing minor damage to power poles, trees, and small outbuildings along its path. The tornado then damaged empty grain bins and some trees before lifting.						
EF2	NW of Bronaugh to Moundville to SW of Nevada	Vernon	MO	37.7329°N 94.5087°W	12:29–12:34	6.5 mi (10.5 km)	200 yd (180 m)
EF2	An extremely fast moving low-end EF2 tornado caused significant damage to a home southwest of Moundville. The tornado continued northeast, damaging several homes, barns, and numerous trees as it moved through Moundville and dissipated shortly after.						
EF1	N of Bronaugh to Eastern Nevada to WNW of Walker	Vernon	MO	37.7246°N 94.4522°W	12:30–12:44	16.6 mi (26.7 km)	200 yd (180 m)
EF1	This tornado initially touched down and tracked northeast, damaging trees and barns as it overtook the Moundville EF2 tornado listed above. As it moved toward Nevada, it also damaged several homes and outbuildings. The tornado caused significant damage to numerous businesses as it crossed US 54 in Nevada and knocked over two sets of four railroad cars. The tornado continued to damage outbuildings and barns across open farmland before lifting.						
EF2	Pilot Grove to ENE of Chouteau Springs	Cooper	MO	38.86°N 92.93°W	13:34–13:40	6.3 mi (10.1 km)	200 yd (180 m)
EF2	The tornado began southwest of Pilot Grove, causing minor damage to an outbuilding before traveling northeast into town. It caused roof damage to homes, destroyed a manufactured home, and uprooted trees onto another home. The tornado intensified to low-end EF2 strength near a newly built barndominium, severely damaging it, and then causing widespread damage to homes, outbuildings, and power poles. The tornado weakened as it moved northward, with limited damage observed near I-70, where it dissipated.						
EF3	WNW of Berryman to Floyd to NW of Old Mines	Crawford, Washington	MO	37.8737°N 91.1336°W	20:13–20:39	21.95 mi (35.33 km)	200 yd (180 m)
EF3	This tornado touched down south of Berryman and moved northeastward, causing mainly minor EF0 tree damage as it approached Route 8. As the tornado approached Floyd, it intensified to EF1 intensity, snapping trees. It also inflicted minor damage to mobile homes, snapped a power pole, and damaged more trees. The tornado then rapidly intensified and reached high-end EF3 intensity as it crossed Route 185 between Ebo and Latty, leveling a home. Another home nearby suffered low-end EF3 damage with the entire top half of the home removed and multiple exterior walls knocked down and trees and power poles were snapped. The tornado then quickly weakened to EF1 intensity before gradually weakening as it continued northeastward, snapping trees and tree branches before dissipating.						
EF1	NE of South Fork	Howell	MO	36.6628°N 91.8988°W	20:16–20:21	1.13 mi (1.82 km)	350 yd (320 m)
EF1	Numerous trees were uprooted and the metal roof of a small farm building was ripped off.						
EF0	NW of Latham to N of Maroa	Logan, Macon, DeWitt	IL	39.98°N 89.18°W	20:40–20:52	12.7 mi (20.4 km)	30 yd (27 m)
EF0	A power pole was snapped and a tree was uprooted and a barn suffered very minor roof damage.						
EF0	NNE of Mercer to WSW of Bemis	Madison	TN	35.5457°N 88.9741°W	21:21–21:26	1.89 mi (3.04 km)	150 yd (140 m)
EF0	Minor roof damage occurred to several homes and multiple trees were uprooted, one of which fell onto a mobile home.						
EF1	SE of Loda	Iroquois	IL	40.4881°N 88.0557°W	22:00–22:02	2.3 mi (3.7 km)	400 yd (370 m)
EF1	Power poles and outbuildings were damaged.						
EF2	WNW of Pierron to SW of Shafter	Bond, Fayette	IL	38.7869°N 89.5416°W	22:05–22:29	22.83 mi (36.74 km)	200 yd (180 m)
EF2	This tornado initially touched down near Pierron, heavily damaging or destroying multiple outbuildings at EF1 intensity. Moving northeastward, the tornado intensified to high-end EF1 strength northeast of the town, snapping numerous trees before further intensifying to high-end EF2 strength south of Stubblefield. Mobile homes were destroyed, a home was left with only interior walls standing, multiple garages were destroyed, and more trees were snapped. Other outbuildings suffered moderate damage, and another home also suffered minor damage. The tornado then weakened significantly to EF0 strength and passed south of Greenville, snapping tree branches and inflicting minor damage to homes and outbuildings as it continued northeastward past Smithboro. Northwest of Mulberry Grove, the tornado restrengthened to EF1 intensity, destroying multiple outbuildings. The tornado then steadily weakened after that, causing only very minor tree damage before dissipating near Shafter. One person was injured.						
EF0	W of Cissna Park	Iroquois	IL	40.5542°N 87.9397°W	22:08–22:11	2.2 mi (3.5 km)	300 yd (270 m)
EF0	Outbuildings at a farm were damaged with the debris deposited downstream over open farmland.						
EF1	NNW of Budapest	Ripley	MO	36.7961°N 90.7364°W	22:32–22:34	1.13 mi (1.82 km)	125 yd (114 m)
EF1	A tornado tracked northeast, crossing Route K where considerable tree damage occurred on either side. Several homes suffered damage, with one experiencing significant roof damage. A few outbuildings were either moved or damaged. The tornado’s path beyond this area is unclear due to limited access and a poor road network.						
EF2	SE of Pocahontas to E of Corning	Randolph, Clay	AR	36.2349°N 90.9378°W	22:56–23:25	24.84 mi (39.98 km)	500 yd (460 m)
EF2	This EF2 tornado began southeast of Pocahontas and moved through Skaggs where it caused extensive roof damage to several homes and compromised outside walls. Several outbuildings were completely destroyed and numerous large trees were uprooted, consistent with EF2 intensity and winds around 125 mph (201 km/h). As the tornado continued northeast, it moved into Old Reyno and crossed into Clay county where it destroyed multiple grain bins. It caused further damage in the Heelstring area, including significant destruction to a church and residences. The tornado continued across the area, snapping utility poles and uprooting trees. Minor structure damage was noted along the western side of Corning Lake. The tornado's final damage points were found along US 62 where minor damage occurred to outbuildings, trees, and power poles as the tornado dissipated.						
EF2	NE of Lodge Corner to Almyra to W of Crocketts Bluff	Arkansas	AR	34.3558°N 91.4491°W	22:56–23:04	8.4 mi (13.5 km)	100 yd (91 m)
EF2	A strong tornado began in a field and moved northeast, collapsing large electrical transmission towers and damaging outbuildings, trailers, and a metal building. The tornado continued across AR 130, causing significant damage to a garage and other structures. It caused the partial destruction of a boat shop, with walls collapsed and metal panels carried away. As it continued, it damaged another metal building, peeling roofing panels and collapsing a porch structure. Debris from the buildings was scattered across fields and power poles were downed. The tornado's path was obscured by flooding but the damage continued northeast with debris visible in fields and radar evidence indicating its track before ending in a field.						
EF1	SSE of Fisher to SE of Waldenburg	Poinsett	AR	35.4452°N 90.9406°W	22:59–23:08	7.47 mi (12.02 km)	400 yd (370 m)
EF1	Several utility poles and trees were snapped or damaged.						
EF1	SE of Altamont	Effingham	IL	39.0196°N 88.713°W	23:08–23:11	2.55 mi (4.10 km)	125 yd (114 m)
EF1	Multiple structures were damaged, but most notably, a home lost its roof.						
EF2	SE of McGee to SSW of Greenbrier	Wayne, Bollinger	MO	37.062°N 90.192°W	23:09–23:22	8.36 mi (13.45 km)	175 yd (160 m)
EF2	A strong tornado severely damaged an A-frame home, ripped most of the roof off a church and another house, and caused severe tree damage.						
EF1	SE of Almyra	Arkansas	AR	34.3959°N 91.4117°W	23:21–23:23	0.9 mi (1.4 km)	50 yd (46 m)
EF1	This high-end EF1 tornado likely began just south of Almyra where debris was found in a field. It then tracked northeast, crossing an area where several wooden power poles were snapped before dissipating in an open field.						
EF1	SE of Teutopolis to S of Woodbury	Effingham, Jasper	IL	39.1033°N 88.4356°W	23:23–23:29	8.31 mi (13.37 km)	100 yd (91 m)
EF1	A high-end EF1 tornado damaged outbuildings, caused minor damage to the roof of a house, bent five power poles, and damaged multiple trees.						
EF3	W of Trumann to Lake City to SW of Leachville	Poinsett, Craighead	AR	35.6752°N 90.592°W	23:26–23:55	24.18 mi (38.91 km)	1,500 yd (1,400 m)
EF3	See section on this tornado – Eight people were injured.						
EF2	SW of Cash to NW of Jonesboro	Craighead	AR	35.7489°N 90.9784°W	23:28–23:42	14.45 mi (23.26 km)	700 yd (640 m)
EF2	The tornado began just west of AR 18, causing tree damage and roof damage to multiple metal outbuildings. It continued northeast, crossing AR 226, where a farm outbuilding was destroyed, trees were snapped, and farm equipment was damaged. The most significant damage occurred along a county road where a grain silo was torn and twisted despite being bolted to the ground. As the tornado continued towards Herman, it snapped and uprooted trees, damaged the gymnasium roof at Westside High School, and destroyed several nearby farm shops. The tornado ended after causing additional tree damage along US 63.						
EF0	S of Woodbury to Jewett	Cumberland	IL	39.1816°N 88.302°W	23:28–23:33	4.03 mi (6.49 km)	150 yd (140 m)
EF0	Multiple roofs and trees were damaged by a high-end EF0 tornado.						
EF2	Toga to Delta to Blomeyer	Stoddard, Cape Girardeau	MO	37.1167°N 89.8842°W	23:32–23:52	14.80 mi (23.82 km)	600 yd (550 m)
EF2	A strong tornado tracked along Route 25 for most of its life, damaging approximately 200 structures, with severe roof damage inflicted to many of them. It snapped power poles and snapped or uprooted trees as well. An indirect fatality occurred after the tornado struck when a responding fire chief fell unconscious while checking on a vehicle that had been blown off of a roadway.						
EF2	N of Jewett, IL to Cleone, IL to New Goshen, IN	Cumberland (IL), Clark (IL), Edgar (IL), Vigo (IN)	IL, IN	39.2341°N 88.247°W	23:33–00:22	48.91 mi (78.71 km)	1,200 yd (1,100 m)
EF2	This strong, long-tracked tornado touched down, uprooting large trees and damaging an outbuilding. It traveled northeast causing mainly weak damage before reaching EF2 intensity where over 20 power poles and large hardwood trees were snapped along with outbuildings and garages being destroyed. The tornado then entered Indiana and struck New Goshen, ripping most roofing off many structures in town. A large garage was heavily damaged with some of its walls entirely picked up and tossed.						
EF1	SE of Vastus to N of Glennonville	Butler, Dunklin	MO	36.5115°N 90.3708°W	23:36–23:58	14.22 mi (22.88 km)	125 yd (114 m)
EF1	A tornado caused damage to over a dozen homes, with shingle or siding damage observed. It also snapped over a dozen power poles and destroyed several of them. Several grain bins were destroyed and many outbuildings sustained significant damage or were completely destroyed. The tornado eventually lifted after crossing the St. Francis River into Dunklin County.						
EF0	NE of Cherry Valley to SW of Payneway	Cross, Poinsett	AR	35.4423°N 90.6832°W	23:40–23:46	6.55 mi (10.54 km)	75 yd (69 m)
EF0	This high-end EF0 tornado caused mainly tree and power line damage across its path.						
EF1	SE of Doddridge to N of Gin City	Lafayette	AR	33.0609°N 93.833°W	23:48–23:59	7.63 mi (12.28 km)	250 yd (230 m)
EF1	A high-end EF1 tornado began by the Red River, crossing an open pasture and levee. It uprooted several trees and caused damage as it moved northeast, crossing an intersection and continuing over farmland. The tornado snapped seven wooden power poles along AR 160 west of Gin City before causing additional damage in the farmland area, snapping three more power poles and a few trees. A small section of a metal roof was also ripped off a home. The tornado finally lifted near a grove of trees behind a church.						
EF1	SSE of Rutland to Bourbon to NNE of Etna Green	Marshall, Kosciusko	IN	41.23°N 86.35°W	23:52–00:10	17.75 mi (28.57 km)	175 yd (160 m)
EF1	A fast-moving tornado snapped and uprooted trees, caused extensive roof damage to several homes, and inflicted sporadic damage to power poles.						
EF1	Southern Cape Girardeau, MO to NE of East Cape Girardeau, IL	Cape Girardeau (MO), Alexander (IL)	MO, IL	37.2692°N 89.5962°W	23:56–00:06	8.33 mi (13.41 km)	150 yd (140 m)
EF1	Minor structural damage occurred to apartments, businesses, and homes in Cape Girardeau. Power poles and trees were damaged as well.						
EF1	NE of Marshall to SE of Dennison to ESE of Elbridge	Clark, Edgar	IL	39.4188°N 87.6397°W	00:02–00:09	8.05 mi (12.96 km)	200 yd (180 m)
EF1	A tornado touched down, blowing two semi-trucks over on I-70. It then caused significant damage at a hog farm, destroying eight buildings and several trees with debris scattered along the tornado's path. Beyond the farm, the tornado continued to damage trees, power lines, and outbuildings before dissipating near the Indiana border.						
EF1	SSE of Reynoldsville to NW of Jonesboro	Union	IL	37.3507°N 89.403°W	00:08–00:20	10.93 mi (17.59 km)	50 yd (46 m)
EF1	This very narrow tornado initially tracked northward along IL 3/IL 146 before turning sharply northeastward and dissipating as it crossed IL 127/IL 146 near Jonesboro. Damage along the path was limited to snapped or uprooted trees.						
EF1	NW of Taylor	Lafayette	AR	33.1762°N 93.5273°W	00:17–00:18	0.27 mi (0.43 km)	75 yd (69 m)
EF1	A tornado touched down in a wooded area just west of AR 53. It uprooted multiple trees before crossing the highway where it continued to snap and uproot several more trees and tree tops before eventually lifting.						
EF1	W of West Atherton to NE of Minshall	Parke	IN	39.633°N 87.3544°W	00:24–00:31	10.78 mi (17.35 km)	120 yd (110 m)
EF1	One home and two other structures sustained high-end EF1 tornado damage. Trees were damaged as well.						
EF0	N of Anna	Union	IL	37.4837°N 89.2362°W	00:25–00:27	1.25 mi (2.01 km)	25 yd (23 m)
EF0	A few trees were snapped or uprooted.						
EF1	McMullin	Scott	MO	36.9503°N 89.6324°W	00:30–00:31	1.14 mi (1.83 km)	250 yd (230 m)
EF1	This high-end EF1 tornado completely destroyed an equipment building, severely damaged the roofs of multiple homes, and snapped or uprooted several trees.						
EF0	NW of Heth	St. Francis, Crittenden	AR	35.1311°N 90.5158°W	00:35–00:38	3.06 mi (4.92 km)	75 yd (69 m)
EF0	A center irrigation pivot was overturned and a few power poles and trees were knocked down.						
EF2	N of Buncombe	Johnson	IL	37.483°N 88.9934°W	00:36–00:43	5.78 mi (9.30 km)	250 yd (230 m)
EF2	Hundreds of pine trees sustained severe damage. The roof was ripped off a house, a few outbuildings were destroyed, and a few cabins were damaged.						
EF1	Orland, IN to W of Pearl Beach, MI	Steuben (IN), Branch (MI)	IN, MI	41.724°N 85.171°W	00:46–00:54	10.82 mi (17.41 km)	600 yd (550 m)
EF1	A tornado touched down in Orland, destroying a small barn and uprooting trees before damaging the roof of an apartment building. It then caused significant tree damage across various properties and moved northeast, crossing into Michigan. The tornado reached its maximum intensity near a farm, tearing roofs off silos, destroying a barn section, and damaging a home with debris. The tornado dissipated after causing additional light structural and tree damage.						
EF1	WNW of East Gilead to Bethel	Branch	MI	41.785°N 85.115°W	00:49–00:52	3.73 mi (6.00 km)	125 yd (114 m)
EF1	This tornado caused tree damage near its touch down location before continuing northeast, affecting multiple Amish properties. The most significant damage occurred on a road west of Bethel where numerous large trees were snapped or uprooted and a home sustained major damage, though repairs had already been made. The wind speeds that damaged the home could not be estimated due to the completed repairs.						
EF1	E of Creal Springs	Williamson	IL	37.6124°N 88.8099°W	00:51–00:55	3.36 mi (5.41 km)	75 yd (69 m)
EF1	Trees were snapped or uprooted, a home sustained roof damage, and a carport was destroyed.						
EF2	NNW of Columbus to SSW of Blandville	Carlisle	KY	36.8334°N 89.1289°W	01:00–01:09	9.73 mi (15.66 km)	200 yd (180 m)
EF2	A strong tornado snapped power poles and lifted a garage off its foundation, moving it a short distance. Dozens of trees were snapped or uprooted along the tornado's path as well. This tornado may have started west of the Mississippi River.						
EF2	NE of Danville to Brownsburg to Northwestern Indianapolis	Hendricks, Marion	IN	39.805°N 86.4958°W	01:05–01:21	13.03 mi (20.97 km)	200 yd (180 m)
EF2	A strong tornado began in rural areas between Danville and Brownsburg before reaching the southern part of downtown Brownsburg where it caused sporadic tree and roof damage. The most significant damage occurred where several warehouses were damaged. One injury occurred when a warehouse wall caved in. Over 20 homes in a nearby neighborhood sustained roof and minor structural damage. Additional tree damage was observed in Eagle Creek Park before the tornado lifted near I-65.						
EF1	NW of Equality to WNW of Ridgway	Saline, Gallatin	IL	37.7749°N 88.3899°W	01:14–01:20	5.14 mi (8.27 km)	300 yd (270 m)
EF1	Trees were snapped or uprooted, a wooden power pole was snapped, and a few outbuildings lost their roofs.						
EF1	NE of Brownsburg	Hendricks	IN	39.8637°N 86.3536°W	01:15–01:17	1.53 mi (2.46 km)	300 yd (270 m)
EF1	A tornado began in a field where ground scouring was noted in high-resolution satellite imagery. It moved east, causing minor damage by bending a small utility pole before reaching a subdivision where several homes had roof and siding damage. The tornado then tracked northeast, crossing another road and destroying two older barns and a silo. Debris was scattered about a quarter mile northeast with ground scouring and a debris field observed.						
EF1	Northern Dyersburg	Dyer	TN	36.04°N 89.42°W	01:15–01:21	5.11 mi (8.22 km)	100 yd (91 m)
EF1	This tornado touched down on the northwest side of Dyersburg and tracked east-northeast across the northern part of the city. The damage consisted mainly of fallen trees and power lines, minor roof damage, and minor structural damage. Sixteen houses were damaged along with one public building and seven businesses. The tornado lifted near David Road near the US 51 and US 412 junction.						
EF2	W of Gage to Northern Paducah	Ballard, McCracken	KY	36.996°N 88.9278°W	01:18–01:34	19.07 mi (30.69 km)	1,000 yd (910 m)
EF2	A low-end EF2 tornado snapped power poles and damaged several barns and outbuildings near Gage, one barn which was completely destroyed. The tornado then caused significant damage to a church, injuring four people who were sheltering under an awning. Upon entering McCracken county, the tornado severely damaged another church adjacent to Barkley Regional Airport. Trees, power poles, and some homes and businesses were damaged as the tornado tracked through the northern parts of Paducah before lifting right at the shore of the Ohio River.						
EF1	S of Cottonwood to W of New Haven	Gallatin, White	IL	37.8562°N 88.2093°W	01:23–01:27	4.96 mi (7.98 km)	100 yd (91 m)
EF1	This tornado touched down and traveled northeast, causing minor roof and siding damage to several homes. It severely damaged a large barn and uprooted or snapped some isolated trees along its path. The tornado caused partial damage to solar panels just east of a road crossing. After crossing the Little Wabash River into White county, the tornado continued to damage trees and overturned an irrigation pivot before dissipating.						
EF1	Carmel	Hamilton	IN	39.9558°N 86.1542°W	01:28–01:35	6.6 mi (10.6 km)	150 yd (140 m)
EF1	This tornado touched down southwest of downtown Carmel, causing damage to an office building with uprooted trees converging toward the structure. It continued northeast, damaging the roofs and siding of several homes and apartment buildings along with numerous uprooted or snapped trees. The damage path was intermittent, with breaks of up to a third of a mile with little to no damage. Most of the damage ended near the White River.						
EF1	ESE of Trimble to NE of Kenton	Gibson, Obion	TN	36.1699°N 89.113°W	01:35–01:46	9.3 mi (15.0 km)	350 yd (320 m)
EF1	A tornado began near an intersection where it caused multiple trees to be snapped at the tops and damaged the roof of a single-family home. It continued northeast, snapping more trees and causing additional roof damage to homes. One home had its siding peeled off and a nearby carport was damaged. The tornado intensified as it moved across open fields, causing significant tree damage and roof damage to barns and homes. It then crossed US 45W where several homes had minor roof damage and additional trees were snapped or uprooted. The tornado continued through fields, damaging more homes and uprooting trees before lifting after crossing a road.						
EF2	SE of Fishersburg	Madison	IN	40.04°N 85.8445°W	01:43–01:46	2.15 mi (3.46 km)	250 yd (230 m)
EF2	A brief but strong tornado caused significant damage at a large farm where both a home and several outbuildings were heavily damaged. Debris was scattered from west to northeast with some of it being deposited over a mile away.						
EF2	E of Unionville, IL to NW of Tiline, KY	Massac (IL), Pope (IL), Livingston (KY)	IL, KY	37.1224°N 88.5038°W	01:43–01:52	12.07 mi (19.42 km)	150 yd (140 m)
EF2	A home sustained roof damage, utility poles were snapped, and trees were damaged.						
EF1	N of Fishersburg to SW of Prosperity	Madison	IN	40.0808°N 85.8606°W	01:46–01:55	11.57 mi (18.62 km)	150 yd (140 m)
EF1	A tornado likely started in a field near a farm and caused significant damage to several barns and a grain silo, including the destruction of an L-shaped pole barn. It also damaged a garage, lifting the roof and collapsing the walls. The tornado continued northeast over mainly rural land before dissipating.						
EF2	N of St. Philip to N of Darmstadt	Posey, Vanderburgh	IN	38.0023°N 87.7132°W	01:51–02:02	10.97 mi (17.65 km)	150 yd (140 m)
EF2	This strong tornado began north of St. Philip and tracked northeast into Vanderburgh county, causing significant damage as it crossed SR 66. Several homes suffered major roof damage and extensive tree damage occurred, particularly with snapped pines. As the tornado crossed SR 65 and moved near Darmstadt, numerous homes sustained roof or siding damage with many trees snapped or uprooted along the path. The tornado ended just north of Darmstadt.						
EF1	Blairsville	Posey	IN	38.07°N 87.77°W	01:52–01:53	1.13 mi (1.82 km)	75 yd (69 m)
EF1	This brief tornado moved through Blairsville. Several homes had shingle, soffit, or siding damage and trees were snapped or uprooted as well.						
EF0	NE of Anderson to Western Yorktown	Madison, Delaware	IN	40.1575°N 85.6126°W	01:52–02:02	4.92 mi (7.92 km)	100 yd (91 m)
EF0	A high-end, intermittent EF0 tornado snapped the tops off of trees and caused roofing and siding damage to multiple structures.						
EF1	NW of Evansville to Northwestern Highland to SE of Buckskin	Vanderburgh, Warrick, Gibson	IN	38.0292°N 87.5993°W	01:55–02:14	17.33 mi (27.89 km)	230 yd (210 m)
EF1	This tornado touched down northeast of Montoux Park, moving northeast and causing minor roof damage to homes and uprooting trees in Highland. It then crossed US 41 and continued northeast, snapping trees and causing minor roof damage in areas between Hillsdale and Earle. The tornado moved through the north side of a neighborhood, damaging roofs, fences, and outbuildings. It crossed I-69 and continued into Warrick county, affecting the north side of Elberfeld before crossing I-64. Further northeast, the tornado impacted another neighborhood, damaging roofs and destroying several sheds. It then crossed SR 68, causing more roof damage and affecting barns and trees in Gibson county before lifting.						
EF2	SE of Moonville to NW of Shideler	Madison, Delaware	IN	40.1882°N 85.5945°W	01:57–02:17	15.15 mi (24.38 km)	200 yd (180 m)
EF2	A strong tornado began in a wooded area south of a farm and hit the first homestead, ripping the fireplace off the home, blowing part of the roof off, and damaging a wall. Several old outbuildings with weak mortar holding them in place were completely destroyed and an old barn was shifted off its foundation, losing its roof. As the tornado moved northeast, it caused significant damage to multiple structures, continuing its path of destruction up to just southwest of Eaton before lifting.						
EF2	WNW of Latham to SW of Austin Springs	Weakley	TN	36.4404°N 88.797°W	02:00–02:12	6.38 mi (10.27 km)	350 yd (320 m)
EF2	A low-end EF2 tornado touched down just east of the Obion county line, causing significant tree damage and destroying a metal barn. A nearby home suffered minor roof damage. As the tornado continued east, it caused more tree damage and significant roof damage to a home along with several trees being snapped or uprooted. The tornado intensified as it reached another area where it severely damaged a home’s roof, displaced a manufactured home, and collapsed a garage. Most of the trees in this area were uprooted or snapped. The tornado continued northeast, causing additional tree damage and minor roof damage to a home and outbuilding. It eventually lifted before reaching Austin Springs.						
EF1	NW of Darmstadt to S of Warrenton	Vanderburgh	IN	38.1158°N 87.5975°W	02:01–02:05	4.08 mi (6.57 km)	75 yd (69 m)
EF1	This tornado damaged several trees and outbuildings and some homes experienced roof or siding damage. A grain bin was destroyed with debris thrown approximately 499 yd (456 m) into a field. The tornado then dissipated near a golf club.						
EF1	NW of Muncie to SW of Shideler	Delaware	IN	40.2488°N 85.4646°W	02:04–02:08	5.81 mi (9.35 km)	200 yd (180 m)
EF1	A couple of outbuildings and a home suffered damage.						
EF1	Northern Boonville to SSE of Dickeyville	Warrick	IN	38.0596°N 87.2821°W	02:10–02:17	6.75 mi (10.86 km)	100 yd (91 m)
EF1	A tornado touched down in Boonville, causing minor roof damage and uprooting trees. It continued northeast through the Rolling Acres area, snapping and uprooting trees. As it crossed additional roads, it caused further damage to trees and some roof shingles. The tornado continued causing tree damage before lifting near a rural intersection.						
EF1	SW of Boydsville, TN to SE of Murray, KY	Weakley (TN), Henry (TN), Graves (KY), Calloway (KY)	TN, KY	36.4756°N 88.5689°W	02:17–02:32	17.49 mi (28.15 km)	200 yd (180 m)
EF1	Numerous outbuildings were destroyed, extensive tree damage occurred, and roofs were blown from homes in rural Calloway county. As it entered into southern Murray, the tornado caused shingle damage to some homes and blew the roof of an auto-repair shop before it lifted.						
EF1	Northern Madisonville to E of Slaughters	Hopkins	KY	37.3354°N 87.5385°W	02:34–02:43	12.55 mi (20.20 km)	50 yd (46 m)
EF1	This tornado began in western Madisonville, removing part of the roof from a Humane Society building, though no animals were harmed. It continued northeast, causing sporadic tree damage and damaging a home's roof and gutters as it crossed I-69. The tornado may have continued into McLean county near Jewel City, but the area was inaccessible due to flooding.						
EF1	SW of Willshire, OH (1st tornado)	Adams	IN	40.7°N 84.85°W	02:47–02:49	2.21 mi (3.56 km)	75 yd (69 m)
EF1	This tornado caused roof damage to several Amish properties which had already been repaired by the time the survey was completed. It also destroyed and partially destroyed well-built pole barns along its path. This tornado occurred simultaneously with, and on a parallel track to, the subsequent Adams county EF1 tornado.						
EF1	SW of Willshire, OH (2nd tornado)	Adams	IN	40.688°N 84.834°W	02:48–02:50	1.47 mi (2.37 km)	100 yd (91 m)
EF1	This tornado first damaged pole barns and poultry farms before removing the roof of a mobile home. It continued its path, tossing a grain silo up to half a mile away and collapsing part of a farm structure. This tornado occurred simultaneously with, and on a parallel track to, the previous Adams county EF1 tornado.						
EF0	SE of Heltonville	Lawrence	IN	38.9039°N 86.3462°W	02:57–02:58	0.06 mi (0.097 km)	20 yd (18 m)
EF0	A brief tornado damaged a pole barn, collapsing all but one of the walls and embedding two 2x4 planks into the ground nearby.						
EF2	WNW of Semiway to Calhoun to N of Buel	McLean	KY	37.491°N 87.3043°W	02:58–03:06	9.49 mi (15.27 km)	200 yd (180 m)
EF2	This low-end EF2 tornado began in the Pack Church community and moved northeast. It caused damage to a historic brick building and a church steeple in downtown Calhoun, as well as to the roof of a nearby home. The tornado continued through the east side of Calhoun, damaging trees in a city park and outbuildings at the 4H fairgrounds. It snapped two power transmission poles and severely damaged an outbuilding along KY 136 before crossing KY 250 where it damaged another outbuilding and snapped large hardwood trees before lifting.						
EF1	SE of Glenmore	Van Wert	OH	40.7749°N 84.6975°W	02:58–03:00	0.81 mi (1.30 km)	50 yd (46 m)
EF1	A brief tornado destroyed an outbuilding and tossed debris 400 yards (370 m) away. Several trees were snapped as well.						
EF1	S of Van Wert to NW of Ottoville	Van Wert, Putnam	OH	40.8124°N 84.583°W	03:02–03:13	15.34 mi (24.69 km)	300 yd (270 m)
EF1	This tornado touched down south of Van Wert, destroying a barn before moving just outside the southeast corner of town and causing tree and shingle damage and destroying another two-story barn. It continued northeast, causing minor damage north of US 30, damaging a deer farm, and destroying a pole barn before dissipating.						
EF2	NE of Mandale to Dupont	Paulding, Putnam	OH	41.026°N 84.348°W	03:18–03:22	4.68 mi (7.53 km)	375 yd (343 m)
EF2	A strong tornado touched down, severely damaging a pole barn before quickly moving into Putnam county. It flipped a well-anchored mobile home at EF2 intensity, injuring two of the three occupants. The tornado destroyed another large pole barn and caused widespread damage in Dupont, including damage to several corn silos. The tornado dissipated shortly after exiting the town.						
EF2	SW of Shorts Corner to ESE of New Salem	Washington, Scott	IN	38.4893°N 86.113°W	03:20–03:33	15.76 mi (25.36 km)	600 yd (550 m)
EF2	A low-end EF2 tornado caused significant damage, especially near a community church where the roof was severely damaged and gravestones in the cemetery were knocked over. A mobile home was destroyed and rolled 75 yards (69 m), with a chest freezer thrown 100 yards (91 m) into the cemetery. The worst damage occurred near a water tower, with the tornado causing widespread tree fall and structural damage. Additional damage occurred to mobile homes, barns, and trees along the tornado's path. The tornado continued northeast, snapping and uprooting trees and causing minor damage to homes. The tornado's path ended in a heavily forested area just across the Washington/Scott county border where sporadic straight-line wind damage was observed.						
EF1	Northern New Albany	Floyd	IN	38.3142°N 85.8399°W	03:53–03:56	2.24 mi (3.60 km)	500 yd (460 m)
EF1	This tornado began just west of an intersection where it snapped several power poles and caused tree damage near a cemetery and nearby neighborhood. It continued east-northeast, impacting a flat area south of Sam Peden Community Park. The tornado caused notable damage in a swath, including tree damage at a preschool and the displacement of a dumpster. Several trees were downed along another road before the tornado lifted.						

=== April 3 event ===
List of confirmed tornadoes – Thursday, April 3, 2025
EF#	Location	County / parish	State	Start coord.	Time (UTC)	Path length	Max. width
EF0	E of Murray to W of New Concord	Calloway	KY	36.6138°N 88.2815°W	04:23–04:31	8.92 mi (14.36 km)	100 yd (91 m)
EF0	This high-end EF0 tornado began east of Murray along KY 94 where it damaged the roof of a commercial building and a nearby church. The tornado continued damaging outbuildings and uprooting trees before lifting on the western shore of Kentucky Lake.						
EF0	ENE of Cedar Grove, IN to NNW of Millville	Franklin (IN), Butler (OH)	IN, OH	39.3757°N 84.8662°W	04:23–04:33	11 mi (18 km)	300 yd (270 m)
EF0	A high-end EF0 tornado touched down north of the community of Sharptown, uprooting and snapping several trees. It continued northeast, causing additional tree damage and minor structural damage as it crossed into Ohio. The tornado moved through the Pater Wildlife Area, snapping numerous trees visible from nearby roads. Further damage to homes, outbuildings, and trees occurred, with power poles snapped along the path. As it continued northeast, the tornado weakened and caused more tree damage before dissipating.						
EF0	W of Clyde	Sandusky	OH	41.3207°N 83.0418°W	04:25–04:27	0.72 mi (1.16 km)	15 yd (14 m)
EF0	This weak tornado with peak winds estimated at 85 mph (137 km/h) caused damage to two barns, leaving debris near US 20. The tornado also left visible marks of rotation in a field.						
EF3	Jeffersontown to Boston	Jefferson	KY	38.1864°N 85.582°W	04:29–04:39	9.68 mi (15.58 km)	350 yd (320 m)
EF3	This intense tornado touched down near an industrial area, initially causing tree damage before intensifying as it moved northeast. It caused significant structural damage, including peeling roofs from metal warehouses, destroying buildings, and scattering debris over large distances. The tornado then reached its peak intensity in eastern Jeffersontown, tearing apart buildings, uprooting trees, and throwing debris up to a mile away. It caused major damage to several commercial properties, including warehouse buildings where their braces failed, and other structures lost roofs and walls. Vehicles were moved, windows blown out, and HVAC units were displaced. The tornado continued northeast, causing roof and siding damage to homes and uprooting trees in residential areas. It weakened and ended with minor damage in a forested area.						
EF0	ENE of Five Points to SSE of Centerville	Warren, Montgomery	OH	39.5725°N 84.1612°W	04:58–05:01	2.98 mi (4.80 km)	200 yd (180 m)
EF0	Numerous trees were damaged and several homes had minor siding damage.						
EF0	Northeastern Maineville to Roachester to NE of Hicks	Warren	OH	39.3197°N 84.186°W	05:02–05:10	8.51 mi (13.70 km)	200 yd (180 m)
EF0	The tornado began in northeastern Maineville where it caused tree and garage damage. It moved northeast, causing more significant tree damage until impacting a subdivision where it inflicted minor damage to homes and damaged more trees. The tornado paralleled US 22 where it removed a metal roof from an outbuilding and uprooted several trees, one of which fell onto a home, before lifting.						
EF2	S of Hopewell, MS to SE of Middleton, TN	Benton (MS), Tippah (MS), Hardeman (TN)	MS, TN	34.9524°N 89.0531°W	05:07–05:23	12.51 mi (20.13 km)	450 yd (410 m)
EF2	This strong tornado began on US 72, causing tree damage and damaging a manufactured home. As it moved northeast into Tippah County, more trees were uprooted, and additional damage to a home was noted. The tornado continued northeast, causing more tree damage and destroying a manufactured home before crossing into Hardeman County in Tennessee. In Hardeman County, the tornado moved through a forested area and then caused significant tree damage as it passed through several rural areas. The tornado crossed SR 125, downing more trees, damaging a home’s roof, and tearing off roof panels from a small barn. The tornado eventually dissipated just south of SR 57. Three injuries occurred.						
EF1	SE of Bardstown to W of Fredericktown	Nelson	KY	37.7521°N 85.4226°W	05:16–05:19	1.97 mi (3.17 km)	175 yd (160 m)
EF1	This tornado began on a hilltop, uprooting several trees and causing significant damage to barns and outbuildings as it tracked east-northeast. The worst damage occurred to a small outbuilding where only one wall remained standing, and debris was scattered up to 200 yards (180 m) away. A nearby house sustained minor fascia damage with slight buckling of brick columns. As the tornado continued, it crossed another road, causing scattered tree damage and minor roof damage to several homes. Multiple barns and small outbuildings were damaged, including a well-built barn whose roof collapsed. The tornado continued northeast, causing isolated tree damage and further damaging barns and lean-tos. It ultimately lifted near a road with no additional significant damage found downstream.						
EF0	N of Fayetteville to Southern Lynchburg	Brown, Highland, Clinton	OH	39.199°N 83.93°W	05:17–05:24	7.88 mi (12.68 km)	250 yd (230 m)
EF0	A tornado began near US 68, destroying a barn and throwing debris into a field. It continued northeast, downing numerous trees on the campus of Chatfield College. As the tornado progressed northeast, it caused tree damage, removed siding and shingles from a home, and downed large limbs. The tornado dissipated near southern Lynchburg, where more tree damage was observed along SR 134.						
EF0	N of St. Martin to WNW of Lynchburg	Clinton	OH	39.2494°N 83.8805°W	05:19–05:22	2.7 mi (4.3 km)	100 yd (91 m)
EF0	A weak tornado caused roof damage to an outbuilding. It continued along a short path where a barn was overturned, and large tree limbs were knocked over. The tornado ended with the destruction of another barn and additional tree damage.						
EF3	SE of Strayhorn to ESE of Coldwater	Tate	MS	34.5828°N 90.1044°W	05:24–05:39	12.22 mi (19.67 km)	650 yd (590 m)
EF3	An intense, high-end EF3 tornado touched down, uprooting several trees as it moved northeast. It intensified as it crossed a road, snapping several tree trunks, and caused severe damage near a local area with one home having multiple collapsed walls and another completely destroyed. The tornado continued its path, crossing MS 4, where additional tree damage occurred and light poles were damaged. It also caused roof damage to a home and further tree damage. After crossing another US 51 and I-55, the tornado caused more damage to homes and trees in a nearby neighborhood before lifting just prior to reaching a creek. Two people were injured.						
EF1	W of Hells Halfacre to Berry to Antioch	Harrison	KY	38.4869°N 84.4658°W	05:26–05:35	10.81 mi (17.40 km)	50 yd (46 m)
EF1	This tornado started by damaging the doors, roof and siding of a barn. The tornado then inflicted significant damage to a travel trailer and a home where part of the roof was torn off and boards were impaled into the house. Continuing northeast, it uprooted several trees near Berry and caused further damage across additional areas. The tornado flipped a camper and caused a barn to lean, then leveled another barn just south of US 27 before lifting.						
EF0	SSW of Sabina to SW of Washington Court House	Clinton, Fayette	OH	39.4424°N 83.6662°W	05:29–05:35	9.08 mi (14.61 km)	350 yd (320 m)
EF0	A high-end EF0 tornado began by knocking down power poles and removing the roofs of two barns along SR 72. As it continued eastward, it destroyed another barn, snapped trees, and caused roof and gutter damage to a home. The tornado scattered debris in multiple directions and downed additional power poles. As it crossed into Fayette county, it continued to cause roof damage to barns and additional tree damage along several roads. The tornado lifted after causing damage to a silo, marking the end of the observed damage path.						
EF3	NE of Pocahontas to Selmer to NW of Oak Grove	McNairy, Hardin	TN	35.1299°N 88.7171°W	05:34–06:07	29.15 mi (46.91 km)	650 yd (590 m)
EF3	5 deaths – See section on this tornado – 14 people were injured.						
EF0	Minerva	Mason	KY	38.7053°N 83.9183°W	05:52–05:55	1.79 mi (2.88 km)	150 yd (140 m)
EF0	This tornado touched down in the center of Minerva, causing minor damage. It followed a nearly identical path as an EF1 tornado from the year prior, moving northeast and causing damage to outbuildings, homes, and farm equipment. While weaker than the tornado from last year, it still produced significant damage. The tornado is believed to have dissipated near Lee Creek.						
EF2	NW of Griderville to SW of Bear Wallow	Barren	KY	37.1219°N 85.8939°W	06:04–06:09	4.89 mi (7.87 km)	400 yd (370 m)
EF2	This strong tornado first touched down near a barn, completely destroying it. The tornado continued over farmland, causing roof damage to several barns and a mobile home. Upon crossing US 31E, the tornado intensified, ripping the roof off a single-story home and also damaging barns and outbuildings. The tornado continued northeast, causing significant roof damage to homes while also snapping and uprooting trees. After crossing an area of open farmland, the damage lessened, with minor tree damage being noted as the tornado dissipated. One person was injured.						
EF3	NE of Red Banks, MS to Grand Junction, TN to SW of Hornsby, TN	Marshall (MS), Benton (MS), Fayette (TN), Hardeman (TN)	MS, TN	34.8902°N 89.5064°W	06:13–07:02	39.55 mi (63.65 km)	1,200 yd (1,100 m)
EF3	2 deaths – See section on this tornado – Three people were injured.						
EF1	ENE of Roachville to S of Elk Horn	Taylor	KY	37.2512°N 85.3896°W	06:29–06:35	6.97 mi (11.22 km)	125 yd (114 m)
EF1	This high-end EF1 tornado initially damaged cedar trees when it first touched down. Proceeding northeastward, the tornado damaged trees and roofs, including the roof of a garage barn. The tornado then crossed KY 55 and caused additional tree damage, uprooting trees and snapping large branches. Significant roof damage was reported at a local restaurant, with wind speeds reaching 110 miles per hour (180 km/h). The tornado continued, causing tree damage in Green River Lake State Park and rural areas before lifting near Green River Lake.						
EF1	SW of Rowland to ENE of Preachersville	Lincoln, Garrard	KY	37.5058°N 84.6543°W	07:07–07:15	8.99 mi (14.47 km)	90 yd (82 m)
EF1	This narrow tornado touched down near the intersection of US 27 and KY 698, where it collapsed a barn and toppled some softwood trees. It continued south, toppling and uprooting more trees near a creek. As it moved toward the Garrard County line, it caused significant damage, including the destruction of outbuildings, the removal of fence posts, and the tearing of fences across KY 39. A single-family home had minor roof damage, and several barns were damaged with panels and metal sheeting ripped apart. The tornado weakened as it approached a rural area where large tree limbs were downed and barns had minor damage before lifting.						
EF1	N of Walterhill to NW of Watertown	Wilson	TN	36.0573°N 86.3648°W	14:36–14:52	11.51 mi (18.52 km)	300 yd (270 m)
EF1	This tornado began northeast of the Nashville Superspeedway, causing timber and minor structural damage. It continued northeast where it inflicted minor damage on homes, including snapped trees and fences, and caused additional timber damage. As the tornado moved northeast, it caused significant tree damage with several hardwoods snapped or uprooted. Some homes had minor roof damage. The tornado also impacted farm structures before dissipating.						
EF1	Northwestern Glen, MS to Walnut Grove, TN	Alcorn (MS), Tishomingo (MS), Lauderdale (AL), Hardin (TN)	MS, AL, TN	34.8603°N 88.44°W	21:38–22:08	28.45 mi (45.79 km)	425 yd (389 m)
EF1	This long-tracked tri-state tornado touched down northeast of a county maintenance facility where it snapped and uprooted several trees, causing moderate damage to one home. It continued through a wooded area before crossing US 72, causing minor roof damage to a school and uprooting several trees. The tornado weakened after this, causing sporadic tree damage through a wooded area. As it moved northeast, it crossed MS 25 and entered JP Coleman State Park, where it caused more tree damage. It then crossed the Tennessee River into extreme northwestern Alabama, where it intensified and caused significant tree damage. The tornado continued northward, uprooting and snapping large trees before crossing into Tennessee with additional tree damage noted in Walnut Grove before the tornado lifted.						
EF0	WNW of Lawrenceburg	Lawrence	TN	35.3085°N 87.5036°W	22:57–22:58	0.07 mi (0.11 km)	25 yd (23 m)
EF0	This tornado was observed to be on the ground for thirty seconds. No damage occurred.						

=== April 4 event ===
List of confirmed tornadoes – Friday, April 4, 2025
EF#	Location	County / parish	State	Start coord.	Time (UTC)	Path length	Max. width
EF0	NW of Van to E of Grand Saline	Van Zandt	TX	32.5833°N 95.7041°W	20:17–20:30	9.01 mi (14.50 km)	75 yd (69 m)
EF0	One home lost part of a wall while another sustained roof damage. A manufactured home also sustained roof and porch damage. Several trees were snapped or uprooted.						
EF2	NE of Bogata to Eastern Clarksville to N of Annona	Red River	TX	33.4931°N 95.1707°W	20:27–21:06	21.11 mi (33.97 km)	580 yd (530 m)
EF2	A strong tornado began in Rosalie, intensifying quickly as it snapped hardwood and softwood trees. A home was heavily damaged, with its garage destroyed and a significant portion of its roof lost. The tornado continued northeast, causing extensive tree damage and partially lifting a pump jack in an oil field. The tornado then tracked through an area with snapped hardwood trees, leading to additional destruction of outbuildings. As it progressed, it caused more tree damage along its path and passed south of the Clarksville/Red River County Airport, with video footage confirming its movement. The tornado weakened as it moved northeast, with sporadic tree damage observed before lifting just north of Reeds Settlement.						
EF1	SE of Millerton to SSE of Bethel	McCurtain	OK	33.9582°N 94.9867°W	20:37–21:23	24.37 mi (39.22 km)	303 yd (277 m)
EF1	This tornado began just west of a local arena and south of US 70, where it uprooted and snapped numerous trees. As it continued its northeast path, the tornado caused tree damage near a home, where a small outbuilding collapsed. After crossing US 70, it caused extensive tree damage along a nearby road and blew the roof off another outbuilding, carrying it across the street. The tornado’s track continued northeast, where significant tree damage was observed, including many uprooted trees and snapped trunks. In the North Pole area, the tornado reached peak intensity, damaging a home with a large fallen tree. As it moved further, it damaged more trees along various roads and up a ridgeline before the track became difficult to trace due to inaccessibility. Despite limited road access, additional tree damage was found further northeast before dissipating shortly after.						
EF1	NE of Lindale to NW of Gilmer	Smith, Wood, Upshur	TX	32.5519°N 95.337°W	21:24–22:01	25.47 mi (40.99 km)	1,420 yd (1,300 m)
EF1	This high-end EF1 tornado began near the Sabine River Bottoms and tracked northeast, initially causing minor tree damage. It became more intense as it moved near Hawkins where numerous pine trees were snapped and one home suffered roof panel damage. The tornado continued northeast, snapping and uprooting trees, with one well-built carport failing into a home. The most significant damage was to a water bottling plant where roof damage occurred and one semi-truck driver was injured. The tornado then moved into open land with debris observed via radar as it caused further tree damage. As it crossed various roads, the tornado widened and continued causing tree damage with significant wind effects observed near Lake Gilmer where waves scoured pavement on a bridge. The tornado eventually lifted north of the lake.						
EF1	NNW of Gilmer	Upshur	TX	32.7933°N 94.9759°W	22:07–22:08	1.1 mi (1.8 km)	1,272 yd (1,163 m)
EF1	A brief but large tornado uprooted and snapped a few trees.						
EF2	Northern Lone Star	Morris	TX	32.9221°N 94.7387°W	22:32–22:41	4.27 mi (6.87 km)	673 yd (615 m)
EF2	This strong tornado began just north of Big Cypress Creek, downing trees and snapping trunks. It strengthened to EF2 intensity as it moved northeast, causing significant structural damage to homes, including one with a garage door buckled by tornadic winds, leading to roof removal. The tornado continued northeast, crossing Ellison Creek Reservoir and damaging a church camp, where numerous large trees were snapped and six cars were thrown 100 yards (91 m). The tornado then moved into a neighborhood, uprooting and snapping trees, causing damage to dozens of homes. It crossed US 259 and continued causing minor roof damage to a home before lifting near FM 3421.						
EF1	NW of Bodcaw	Hempstead, Nevada	AR	33.5741°N 93.4866°W	01:29–01:32	2.7 mi (4.3 km)	375 yd (343 m)
EF1	A few structures were damaged, including some chicken houses, and multiple trees were damaged.						

=== April 5 event ===
List of confirmed tornadoes – Saturday, April 5, 2025
EF#	Location	County / parish	State	Start coord.	Time (UTC)	Path length	Max. width
EF2	WSW of Colt to Levesque	St. Francis, Cross	AR	35.1217°N 90.8516°W	06:34-06:53	12.74 mi (20.50 km)	350 yd (320 m)
EF2	A strong tornado began by causing tree damage and minor roof damage to a home. It continued northeast, destroying a manufactured home along AR 306 and blowing away the debris. Several nearby homes had minor roof damage. Further damage was noted near AR 1 in Wilkins where a large outbuilding was shifted off its foundation and collapsed. The tornado also caused damage to a chemical plant, flipped a semi, and damaged numerous homes near Fitzgerald Crossing. The most significant damage in this area occurred to a very large metal outbuilding and several destroyed manufactured homes. The tornado then continued and damaged solar panels in a solar farm between AR 1 and Cathy Lake. It moved into a country club, causing significant damage and lofting a storage building 100 yards (91 m). The tornado impacted the Levesque area, destroying small outbuildings and uprooting multiple trees before lifting just east of AR 163. One person was injured.						
EF1	SE of Parkin to NNW of Earle	Cross, Crittenden	AR	35.2215°N 90.525°W	07:03–07:10	5.65 mi (9.09 km)	150 yd (140 m)
EF1	This tornado formed in far eastern Cross County, where minor damage was reported to a farm outbuilding. The tornado moved northeast, overturning a couple of irrigation pivots before crossing railroad tracks. It intensified as it crossed US 64, snapping several utility poles and producing significant tree damage. Additional tree damage was observed along AR 184, with damage becoming more sporadic as the tornado lifted.						
EF1	SE of Tyronza to NW of Birdsong	Poinsett	AR	35.4561°N 90.3233°W	07:24–07:28	2.6 mi (4.2 km)	150 yd (140 m)
EF1	A brief tornado touched down just west of I-555, crossing the highway and knocking multiple train boxcars off their bases along the BNSF Thayer South Subdivision. The box car bases remained on the tracks. The tornado continued northeast, damaging multiple power poles before lifting.						
EF0	Driver to Western Osceola	Mississippi	AR	35.6094°N 90.0155°W	07:52–08:01	7.56 mi (12.17 km)	150 yd (140 m)
EF0	This high-end EF0 tornado developed on US 61 in Driver, where it caused minor damage to the roof of a home. The tornado moved almost due north, downing utility poles and doing tree damage before entering Osceola, doing minor damage to fences and trees in the western portion of town before lifting.						
EF0	NNE of Fulton	Lauderdale	TN	35.6634°N 89.8526°W	08:06–08:07	0.95 mi (1.53 km)	50 yd (46 m)
EF0	A brief tornado touched down on the eastern shore of the Mississippi River, causing sporadic tree damage, with further analysis aided by high-resolution satellite data due to flooding and inaccessibility.						
EF0	SW of Cherry to NW of Glimp	Lauderdale	TN	35.6483°N 89.7353°W	08:11–08:21	6.41 mi (10.32 km)	100 yd (91 m)
EF0	A weak tornado formed near the Hatchie River, moving northeast and causing tree damage as it passed through Cherry, where a barn was damaged, trees were uprooted, and a church had its doors blown out. The tornado continued, causing more tree damage before dissipating in a wooded area.						
EF1	W of Ripley	Lauderdale	TN	35.7109°N 89.5991°W	08:22–08:26	3.03 mi (4.88 km)	100 yd (91 m)
EF1	Scattered tree damage occurred.						
EF1	NE of Ripley to E of Gates	Lauderdale	TN	35.7856°N 89.4567°W	08:35–08:43	5.32 mi (8.56 km)	150 yd (140 m)
EF1	Multiple barns and outbuildings had roof damage, a home lost its siding, and numerous trees were uprooted or snapped.						
EF0	SW of Gates	Lauderdale	TN	35.7758°N 89.453°W	08:35–08:38	2.3 mi (3.7 km)	50 yd (46 m)
EF0	A brief, weak tornado produced minor damage to a home. Sporadic tree damage was observed as the tornado moved north-northeast, crossing a path of the previous tornado before lifting.						
EF1	Southeastern Friendship	Crockett	TN	35.8802°N 89.2509°W	08:49–08:56	2.56 mi (4.12 km)	75 yd (69 m)
EF1	One tree was uprooted, and several others were damaged.						
EF0	SW of Big Sandy	Henry	TN	36.1725°N 88.2048°W	10:16–10:20	1.96 mi (3.15 km)	100 yd (91 m)
EF0	Multiple trees were uprooted, and roof damage occurred to several homes and barns.						
EF1	NNE of Big Sandy	Benton	TN	36.3069°N 88.0134°W	10:37–10:43	2.62 mi (4.22 km)	350 yd (320 m)
EF1	A tornado touched down, causing a tree to snap in half and another to be uprooted. It continued to damage trees along a road before moving northeast, crossing a small cove of the Tennessee River. The tornado intensified over the cove and made landfall, where it uprooted and blew over dozens of trees. The tornado lifted just before reaching the Tennessee River again.						
EF2	E of Fulton to NW of Hope	Hempstead	AR	33.6255°N 93.7618°W	14:36–14:50	10.43 mi (16.79 km)	500 yd (460 m)
EF2	This low-end EF2 tornado first touched down just north of I-30 and quickly moved east-northeast. The tornado's most intense damage occurred where widespread tree damage was observed with peak winds of 115 mph (185 km/h). Significant tree damage continued through the intersection of I-30 and US 278, where the tornado reached its maximum width. After this point, the tornado began weakening and gradually decreased in size, with the last damage observed being minor tree damage on the north side of Hope. Along its path, the tornado caused substantial damage to hardwood and softwood trees, with some outbuildings and carports also affected. A recreational vehicle was rolled, and a mobile home was pushed off its foundation.						
EF1	NNW of Lobelville	Humphreys	TN	35.8799°N 87.8227°W	20:49–20:51	2.63 mi (4.23 km)	150 yd (140 m)
EF1	A tornado began near I-40, snapping and uprooting numerous trees. The tornado then impacted a farmer's market, causing some damage there before dissipating in a heavily wooded area.						
EF0	Dickson	Dickson	TN	36.0576°N 87.3831°W	21:15–21:16	0.35 mi (0.56 km)	50 yd (46 m)
EF0	Several structures sustained roof and siding damage.						
EF1	NNE of Schlater to S of Philipp	Leflore, Tallahatchie	MS	33.6829°N 90.3167°W	21:49–22:00	7.31 mi (11.76 km)	700 yd (640 m)
EF1	This high-end EF1 tornado began north of Schlater, damaging several utility poles before crossing the Tallahatchie River into Sunnyside. It destroyed a mobile home and continued across the river again, back into Leflore County where it snapped a utility pole and damaged several sheds. A couple of homes also sustained roof damage, and an irrigation pivot was overturned. As the tornado turned eastward, it crossed the Little Tallahatchie River, snapping and uprooting numerous trees before lifting shortly after.						
EF1	SSW of Philipp to SSE of Cascilla	Tallahatchie, Grenada	MS	33.7407°N 90.2119°W	22:00–22:14	14.54 mi (23.40 km)	100 yd (91 m)
EF1	A tornado moved east-northeastward through the Tallahatchie National Wildlife Refuge, crossing into western Grenada county and then crossing MS 8. The tornado continued across additional rural areas before crossing into southeastern Tallahatchie County. Along its path, several trees were uprooted, and some smaller trees were snapped. At least one structure was damaged when a tree fell on its roof before the tornado lifted.						
EF2	NW of Tula to Eastern New Albany to SSW of Dumas	Lafayette, Pontotoc, Union, Tippah	MS	34.2427°N 89.3711°W	23:12–00:11	39.71 mi (63.91 km)	600 yd (550 m)
EF2	This strong, long-tracked tornado formed between the communities of Cornish and Tula, initially producing minor tree damage. It quickly intensified as it crossed US 278 southeast of Lafayette Springs, snapping numerous power poles and trees and causing minor roof damage. This damage continued as the tornado crossed into northwest Pontotoc County where it caused significant damage to trees and utility poles northwest of Thaxton, especially along MS 336. As the tornado moved northeast toward Hurricane, it substantially damaged several farm outbuildings and removed part of a roof from a home. Additional tree and utility pole damage was noted along MS 346 and MS 355. The tornado then moved over forested bottomland around Mud Creek, crossing into Union County near Flatwood. Trees and a few homes and outbuildings sustained damage as well as in the Bald Hill and Fairview areas. The tornado weakened as it crossed MS 15, with damage becoming more sporadic. The circulation was still relatively weak as it crossed I-22 southeast of New Albany, but it did overturn a semi-truck. Minor damage to homes, trees, and utility poles was observed on the eastern side of New Albany from MS 348 to MS 30. Mostly tree damage was observed as the tornado moved northeast through Kewonville, though a few homes had minor roof damage. After crossing into Tippah County, the tornado snapped large branches off a tree before lifting.						
EF1	S of New Harmony to ESE of Blue Springs	Union	MS	34.3779°N 88.9227°W	00:29–00:34	4.09 mi (6.58 km)	300 yd (270 m)
EF1	A brief tornado formed just west of a Toyota plant near New Harmony, where tree damage was noted along a local road. Several homes sustained minor roof damage, with one home having a couple of windows blown out. Several outbuildings were destroyed or heavily damaged, and trees were uprooted or snapped. The tornado weakened as it crossed I-22, causing additional but more sporadic damage to trees and power lines before dissipating.						
EF0	SE of Biggersville to NW of Glen	Alcorn	MS	34.8247°N 88.5418°W	00:40–00:50	6.53 mi (10.51 km)	150 yd (140 m)
EF0	Sporadic tree damage occurred.						
EF1	Northern Saltillo	Lee	MS	34.3803°N 88.7395°W	01:53–02:01	4.39 mi (7.07 km)	550 yd (500 m)
EF1	This high-end EF1 tornado caused multiple trees to be uprooted before continuing eastward, with additional trees snapped and uprooted along its path. The tornado then crossed US 45, causing widespread tree damage and minor damage to a few single-family homes in a nearby neighborhood. Further northeast, sporadic tree damage was observed along MS 145 before the tornado lifted shortly after this point.						
EF1	NW of Dennis	Tishomingo	MS	34.5635°N 88.2614°W	02:40–02:45	3.12 mi (5.02 km)	75 yd (69 m)
EF1	Multiple trees were damaged.						
EF1	SE of Pride to Sheffield	Colbert	AL	34.7188°N 87.8127°W	03:18–03:30	8.43 mi (13.57 km)	275 yd (251 m)
EF1	A tornado began just southeast of Pride, causing significant tree damage and minor roof damage to a small farm building. As it continued eastward across Little Bear Creek, it caused widespread tree damage and structural damage to homes from fallen trees. The tornado moved through Sheffield, where additional tree damage was observed before lifting just west of US 43.						
EF1	Tuscumbia to Ford City to NW of Rogersville	Colbert, Lauderdale	AL	34.7099°N 87.7779°W	03:25–03:57	28.76 mi (46.28 km)	280 yd (260 m)
EF1	This "twin" tornado, originating from the same parent circulation as the Sheffield tornado, touched down just south of US 72 and tracked through Tuscumbia and Muscle Shoals. The tornado caused significant tree damage, including uprooted trees and snapped hardwood trunks, with wind speeds at high-end EF1 intensity. It caused widespread damage in a trailer park where large trees fell on residential units, resulting in five injuries. As it continued northward, the tornado passed through Ford City, crossing Wilson Lake, and caused more tree damage as it entered Lauderdale County. The tornado continued uprooting trees and snapping large limbs, affecting neighborhoods and damaging homes and fences as it moved through the south side of Elgin. The tornado weakened as it crossed US 72 Second Creek and eventually lifted just south of Toonersville. This was the second of three tornadoes to strike Elgin in 2025, as well as the second tornado to strike Tuscambia and Muscle Shoals this year.						
EF1	Center Star to Elgin to WNW of Rogersville	Lauderdale	AL	34.8572°N 87.4601°W	03:45–03:53	5.76 mi (9.27 km)	85 yd (78 m)
EF1	A "twin" tornado developed to the north of the previous tornado. Numerous hardwood trees were uprooted, and a farm shed sustained roof damage. More uprooted trees were observed east of Bluewater Creek, extending through the intersection of SR 101 and US 72. Damage after the intersection became sparse until the tornado lifted near Pine Haven Shores. This was the third of three tornadoes to strike Elgin in 2025.						

=== April 6 event ===
List of confirmed tornadoes – Sunday, April 6, 2025
EF#	Location	County / parish	State	Start coord.	Time (UTC)	Path length	Max. width
EF1	Cowan to SE of Sewanee	Franklin	TN	35.1673°N 86.0169°W	05:38–05:52	8.71 mi (14.02 km)	350 yd (320 m)
EF1	A tornado touched down in Cowan, causing several trees to be uprooted and split. As it moved east, sporadic tree damage was observed with the tornado peaking in intensity along a lane where several large hardwood trees were uprooted and a shelter's roof was damaged by a falling tree. The tornado continued southeast, crossing roads and causing more tree damage, including trees snapped in various directions. It eventually lifted after uprooting additional trees near a ridgeline.						
EF1	Northern Monteagle to Tracy City	Grundy	TN	35.2484°N 85.8481°W	05:51–06:02	6.38 mi (10.27 km)	400 yd (370 m)
EF1	This tornado began over northern Monteagle, causing initial damage to trees and structures as it moved eastward. It strengthened as it reached Tracy City where significant tree damage occurred and some structural damage was noted. A baseball field in Tracy City had the metal roofing for its stands completely blown off with debris scattered across the park. Several homes experienced roof damage from fallen trees and some farm outbuildings were either collapsed or had their roofs blown off. The tornado then lifted on the southside of town.						
EF1	W of Langston	Marshall, Jackson	AL	34.5336°N 86.1605°W	06:33–06:39	1.08 mi (1.74 km)	175 yd (160 m)
EF1	This tornado developed over a cove on Guntersville Lake, initially causing significant tree damage with many trees snapped or uprooted along the shore. The tornado then destroyed a boat-slip house while also damaging nearby homes. Moving inland, the tornado continued to uproot trees, though the damage was more sporadic as it encountered elevation changes. It downed only a few trees and branches as it weakened before lifting over the lake.						
EF1	SSE of Lake to WNW of Newton	Newton	MS	32.2715°N 89.29°W	07:26–07:38	7.47 mi (12.02 km)	150 yd (140 m)
EF1	A tornado touched down, snapping trees as it moved north-northeast. It continued across a farm, damaging chicken houses and a metal farm building. The tornado tracked towards US 80 and I-20 where it caused sporadic tree damage, uprooting a mix of softwood and hardwood trees. The tornado dissipated shortly after crossing the two highways.						
EF1	ESE of New Hebron	Jefferson Davis	MS	31.7194°N 89.9582°W	07:51–07:52	1.37 mi (2.20 km)	300 yd (270 m)
EF1	This brief tornado touched down north of a road and caused damage to trees and vegetation. It continued northeastward, passing through Hebron and downing numerous trees along its path. Minor structural damage, including gutter damage and light damage to outbuildings, was noted before the tornado lifted.						
EF2	WSW of De Kalb	Kemper	MS	32.7478°N 88.8286°W	08:35–08:37	1.86 mi (2.99 km)	300 yd (270 m)
EF2	This tornado began in the Cleveland community, tracking east-northeastward. It crossed MS 16, causing multiple barns to be demolished or heavily damaged and snapping or uprooting several trees. Several box trucks and tractors were turned on their sides and a home sustained minor damage. The tornado also caused significant damage to a home, including removing a large portion of the roof and causing part of the outer walls to collapse before dissipating.						
EF2	W of Raleigh	Smith	MS	32.0519°N 89.5828°W	08:57–09:07	3.54 mi (5.70 km)	500 yd (460 m)
EF2	A strong tornado caused minor tree damage and snapped both hardwood and softwood trees as it touched down. It then moved north, snapping and uprooting trees in a concentrated area as it intensified. It caused significant damage to several homes, including a brick home where the roof was removed, windows were blown out, and an RV was thrown through a metal outbuilding. A second home also sustained roof damage and another RV was thrown into a porch, causing it to collapse. The tornado weakened as it approached MS 18, leaving only minor tree damage before dissipating shortly after crossing the highway.						
EF2	WNW of Soso to Stringer to E of Bay Springs	Jones, Smith, Jasper	MS	31.7969°N 89.3493°W	09:43–10:10	15.22 mi (24.49 km)	200 yd (180 m)
EF2	1 death – This strong tornado began near Summerland, uprooting trees along MS 28, and then moved northeast across rural areas of Smith county. It crossed into Jasper county, where it initially caused roof damage, primarily removing shingles. The tornado fluctuated between EF0 and EF1 intensity with more tree damage reported along its path. Upon an abrupt leftward turn, it intensified to EF2 strength near a community southwest of Stringer, where a mobile home was knocked off its blocks and slid several feet while another was completely destroyed and launched onto two parked vehicles, killing its occupant. The tornado then continued northeast, severely damaging a two-story brick house by removing the roof and knocking down the back wall. It moved on, weakening as it passed through the Lake Como area and dissipated shortly after crossing MS 528.						
EF0	SE of Soso	Jones	MS	31.7169°N 89.2732°W	10:13–10:21	4.56 mi (7.34 km)	50 yd (46 m)
EF0	A high-end EF0 tornado touched down south of MS 29 where it downed trees and limbs as it moved northeast. The tornado caused light damage to trees and vegetation along its path. The most significant damage occurred near the tornado's endpoint where a large farm outbuilding had its west-facing anchors pulled from the ground and was flipped over before the tornado dissipated.						
EF2	Northern Glendale to N of Petal	Forrest	MS	31.3729°N 89.33°W	10:57–11:06	6.45 mi (10.38 km)	400 yd (370 m)
EF2	This strong tornado touched down east of I-59, causing tree damage and knocking over a billboard sign. It continued northeast, uprooting trees and causing shingle damage to roofs in several areas. After crossing the Leaf River, the tornado reached low-end EF2 intensity, causing significant roof damage to two homes and overturning two RVs. The tornado also snapped and uprooted numerous trees. After crossing US 11, it damaged a mobile home and a large construction building. The tornado continued northeast, damaging more trees before dissipating.						
EF1	Energy	Clarke	MS	32.1829°N 88.5482°W	11:42–11:43	0.87 mi (1.40 km)	150 yd (140 m)
EF1	A brief tornado touched down in the community of Energy, damaging a shed near the intersection of MS 514 and a county road. As the tornado moved northeast along MS 514, tree damage became more concentrated and a metal outbuilding sustained roof damage. The tornado continued to uproot several trees and damaged another shed before dissipating.						
EF2	E of Increase, MS to N of Yantley, AL	Lauderdale (MS), Choctaw (AL)	MS, AL	32.2362°N 88.4771°W	11:54–12:02	5.27 mi (8.48 km)	800 yd (730 m)
EF2	A strong tornado initially caused minor tree damage with broken branches and uprooted softwood trees. It intensified as it moved north, causing significant damage by snapping numerous trees. Several homes experienced roof damage with more than a fifth of their roofing material lost. The tornado took an easterly turn near MS 19, weakening but continuing to cause tree damage. It crossed the state line at MS 19/SR 10, continuing its path in Alabama and causing further tree damage before dissipating.						
EF1	Pine Hill	Wilcox	AL	31.9814°N 87.5911°W	13:58–13:59	0.51 mi (0.82 km)	75 yd (69 m)
EF1	This tornado touched down in Pine Hill where a few trees were uprooted in a weak convergent pattern. It then continued east, causing weak tree damage before intensifying as it crossed SR 5. Upon crossing the highway, several large softwood pines were snapped and minor damage was observed to a home as the tornado dissipated.						
EF1	Northern Pine Hill	Wilcox	AL	31.992°N 87.5792°W	13:59–14:04	1.22 mi (1.96 km)	150 yd (140 m)
EF1	A high-end EF1 tornado began in the woods behind an intersection, causing damage to large hardwood limbs and uprooting small trees. An unattached awning from a gas station was lofted and thrown about 50 yards (46 m) into a tree. After crossing SR 5, the tornado caused roof damage to a restaurant and continued producing tree damage, including uprooted and snapped hardwood trees. Upon crossing SR 10, additional tree damage occurred. The most significant damage took place as the tornado crossed an area where numerous large hardwood and softwood trees were uprooted and snapped. A single-wide manufactured home was rolled, though it was not properly secured. The tornado likely continued northeast into the woods, where survey crews were unable to assess further damage.						
EF1	NE of Sardis	Dallas	AL	32.2907°N 86.9572°W	15:13–15:15	1.32 mi (2.12 km)	400 yd (370 m)
EF1	Two buildings suffered minor roof damage and several trees were snapped or uprooted.						
EF0	W of Big Point to S of Hurley	Jackson	MS	30.59°N 88.53°W	19:43–19:47	2.73 mi (4.39 km)	25 yd (23 m)
EF0	A weak tornado caused minor and patchy tree damage. It produced high snaps, large broken branches, and a few uprooted trees, with the strongest damage occurring right after it touched down. Additional scattered damage was observed in tree tops, but as the tornado weakened, only small branches and debris were left in its path. The tornado ultimately dissipated near a park area.						
EF1	Northeastern Columbus	Muscogee	GA	32.5445°N 84.8633°W	19:56–20:00	2.62 mi (4.22 km)	350 yd (320 m)
EF1	A tornado touched down just northeast of downtown Columbus, initially impacting the Beaver Run neighborhood. Numerous trees were snapped or uprooted with a few homes sustaining tree damage. The tornado continued northeast, crossing the Bull Creek Golf Course, where it caused widespread tree damage. The tornado continued along US 27, causing additional tree damage before weakening and dissipating soon thereafter.						
EF1	WNW of Huber to N of Dry Branch	Twiggs, Bibb	GA	32.7426°N 83.5861°W	21:45–22:03	9.19 mi (14.79 km)	450 yd (410 m)
EF1	A tornado developed in the Bond Swamp National Wildlife Refuge and moved into northern Twiggs county, beginning near the Bibb-Twiggs county line. The tornado caused significant tree damage, including snapped and uprooted trees along US 23, bringing down powerlines. It continued northeast, impacting areas near the broadcast towers and I-16, causing more tree damage. The tornado continued causing widespread tree damage before crossing US 80. It continued through an unpopulated area with tree farms, with weak damage being observed. The tornado weakened as it moved northeast with only minor tree damage noted before dissipating.						
EF0	SE of Perote	Barbour	AL	31.9009°N 85.6234°W	03:21–03:23	0.48 mi (0.77 km)	50 yd (46 m)
EF0	A very brief tornado touched down within Star Hill, causing some tree damage.						

=== April 7 event ===
List of confirmed tornadoes – Monday, April 7, 2025
EF#	Location	County / parish	State	Start coord.	Time (UTC)	Path length	Max. width
EF0	ENE of Hilton to WSW of Blakely	Early	GA	31.295°N 85.0439°W	10:46–10:56	7.41 mi (11.93 km)	50 yd (46 m)
EF0	An elementary school had minor damage and a few pine trees were snapped.						
EF1	E of Haralson to NW of Experiment	Coweta, Fayette, Spalding	GA	33.2279°N 84.524°W	11:22–11:38	13.89 mi (22.35 km)	250 yd (230 m)
EF1	A tornado began in southeastern Coweta County where it snapped trees near a house and outbuilding. The tornado continued east-northeast into Spalding County, crossing several roads and uprooting and snapping trees, some of which fell onto homes. The tornado briefly crossed into Fayette County before crossing back into Spalding County, intensifying as it continued uprooting and snapping more trees. The tornado then weakened as it crossed a couple of roads, causing sporadic tree damage before lifting.						
EF0	S of Sunny Side to WNW of Towalaga	Spalding	GA	33.3213°N 84.3113°W	11:38–11:44	4.28 mi (6.89 km)	100 yd (91 m)
EF0	This weak tornado initially snapped a few trees along its path before crossing US 19. It then downed several trees, including one of which fell onto a home. The tornado continued into a mostly wooded and inaccessible area, snapping trees as it crossed additional roads. As it approached Cole Reservoir, the tornado weakened before dissipating.						
EF0	Northern Locust Grove	Henry	GA	33.373°N 84.1571°W	11:48–11:50	1.62 mi (2.61 km)	75 yd (69 m)
EF0	A weak tornado touched down, snapping trees along its path. It crossed I-75, causing additional tree damage and tossing construction barrels onto the highway. The tornado lifted before reaching US 23.						
EF1	NE of Cairo to NW of Ochlocknee	Grady, Thomas	GA	30.9525°N 84.1645°W	15:02–15:11	4.56 mi (7.34 km)	200 yd (180 m)
EF1	This high-end EF1 tornado touched down in a wooded area just west of SR 111 in northeastern Grady county, causing some initial damage to structures and trees. It intensified as it moved east, producing concentrated damage near a road intersection where a single-wide mobile home was completely destroyed. The tornado lifted the mobile home’s support frame out of the ground and caused damage to other homes in the area. It continued to cause significant tree damage, snapping pine and oak trees and damaging several residences along its path. The tornado weakened as it crossed into Thomas county with the last damage occurring near smaller pine trees as it dissipated.						
EF1	N of Chastain	Colquitt	GA	31.0986°N 83.9551°W	15:27–15:30	0.85 mi (1.37 km)	150 yd (140 m)
EF1	A tornado began in a wooded area, snapping and uprooting large pines, some of which fell on a home and outbuilding. It continued northeast, causing roof shingle loss and minor damage to a storage shed at another residence. After crossing SR 202, the tornado weakened but still caused occasional damage to pine trees, eventually toppling an irrigation pivot system as it lifted.						
EF1	SSE of Bloxham to SW of Ochlockonee	Leon	FL	30.3381°N 84.6045°W	15:27–15:49	12.17 mi (19.59 km)	200 yd (180 m)
EF1	A tornado touched down in the Apalachicola National Forest, causing minor tree damage and roof damage in a neighborhood as it tracked northeast. It crossed SR 267, continuing to uproot trees and damage branches along its path. The tornado dissipated near SR 20. Many of the damage points in the forest were inaccessible by vehicle but were estimated using radar data.						
EF1	N of Bradfordville, FL to SSE of Beachton, GA	Leon (FL), Grady (GA)	FL, GA	30.6099°N 84.2323°W	16:16–16:27	8.6 mi (13.8 km)	150 yd (140 m)
EF1	This tornado touched down in the Killearn Lakes neighborhood where it snapped and uprooted several trees, some of which fell on homes. It continued northeast, causing additional damage to homes and trees. As it moved northeast, it crossed over Lake Iamonia and then US 319, snapping and uprooting pine trees along the way. The tornado continued through the area, crossing more roads before lifting over a private plantation just over the Georgia state line.						
EF0	Waycross	Ware	GA	31.2136°N 82.3461°W	23:03–23:08	1.72 mi (2.77 km)	20 yd (18 m)
EF0	A high-end EF0 tornado began in Waycross where it caused damage by snapping softwood trees and large branches that fell on homes. As it moved northeast, it damaged roofs, gutters, and siding on homes along several streets. It also uprooted hardwood trees and damaged fences along other streets. The tornado caused partial roof damage in the northeastern part of the area and dissipated shortly thereafter.						

== See also ==
- Weather of 2025
- List of North American tornadoes and tornado outbreaks
- Tornadoes of 2025
- List of United States tornadoes in April 2025
- Lists of tornadoes and tornado outbreaks
- 1974 Super Outbreak- A destructive tornado outbreak that struck around 50 years ago.
- 2021 Tri-State tornado- A destructive EF4 tornado in northeast Arkansas, Missouri, and Tennessee 3 and 1/2 years prior.
