= Glenville, Kentucky =

Unincorporated community in Kentucky, United States

- Unincorporated community
- Nickname: Lickskillet
- Location within Kentucky Location within the United States
- Coordinates: 37°35′40″N 87°11′36″W
- Country: United States
- State: Kentucky
- County: McLean
- Elevation: 443 ft (135 m)
- Time zone: UTC-6 (Central (CST))
  - Summer (DST): UTC-5 (CDT)
- Census code: 31438
- GNIS feature ID: 508101

Glenville (also Lickskillet) is an unincorporated community in McLean County, Kentucky, United States.

== History ==
Glenville was established by John Moseley in 1825 with the name Long Falls Creek, after the creek that runs south of the community. In 1859 the hamlet was renamed Glenville for the large number of Glenn families in the area (likely descendants of Kentucky pioneer, David Glenn, who moved to the area in the 1790s) but was reverted to Long Falls Creek in 1864 and changed one final time to Glenville in 1884. In the early 1900s, the community was commonly called Lickskillet (or Lick Skillet) for the scarcity of food in the area at the time, which led to its discontinuation in 1905.

== Geography ==
Glenville is located on the northern border of McLean County, and is neighbored by Daviess County to the north, Tichenor to the east, Buel to the south, Calhoun to the southwest, and Guffie to the west. It is found at the intersection of State Secondary Route 81 and Rural Secondary Route 140. It is located at latitude 37.595 and longitude -87.193.
