= 1996 United States presidential election in Kentucky =

- November 5, 1996
- Turnout: 59.3%

Nominee	Bill Clinton	Bob Dole	Ross Perot
Party	Democratic	Republican	Reform
Home state	Arkansas	Kansas	Texas
Running mate	Al Gore	Jack Kemp	Patrick Choate
Electoral vote	8	0	0
Popular vote	636,614	623,283	120,396
Percentage	45.84%	44.88%	8.67%

Clinton
40–50%
50–60%
60–70%
70–80%
Dole
40–50%
50–60%
60–70%
President before election
Bill Clinton
Democratic
Elected President
Bill Clinton
Democratic

The 1996 United States presidential election in Kentucky took place on November 5, 1996, as part of the 1996 United States presidential election. Voters chose 8 representatives, or electors to the Electoral College, who voted for president and vice president.

Kentucky was won by President Bill Clinton (D) over Senator Bob Dole (R-KS), with Clinton winning 45.84% to 44.88% by a slim margin of 0.96%, thus marking Kentucky the closest contest in the entire election. Billionaire businessman Ross Perot (Reform-TX) finished in third, with 8.67% of the popular vote.

As of the 2024 presidential election, this is the last time that the Democratic nominee carried Kentucky, as well as any of these 36 counties: Powell, Montgomery, Nicholas, Lawrence, Bourbon, Nelson, Simpson, McCracken, Hopkins, Calloway, Graves, Greenup, Clark, Marshall, Meade, Bell, Logan, Ohio, Johnson, Marion, Harrison, Henry, Union, Trigg, Morgan, Webster, Caldwell, Martin, Carroll, McLean, Livingston, Trimble, Gallatin, Lyon, Carlisle, and Hickman.

Until this election a swing state, Kentucky has been carried by Republicans by double-digits in every subsequent election, and the party's margin of victory has almost exclusively increased in the 21st century, making this a last time it was regarded as a swing state by some outlets.

== Primaries ==
- 1996 Kentucky Democratic presidential primary

== Results ==
1996 United States presidential election in Kentucky
Party	Candidate	Running mate	Votes	Percentage	Electoral votes
Democratic	Bill Clinton (incumbent)	Al Gore (incumbent)	636,614	45.84%	8
Republican	Bob Dole	Jack Kemp	623,283	44.88%	0
Reform	Ross Perot	Patrick Choate	120,396	8.67%	0
Libertarian	Harry Browne	Jo Jorgensen	4,009	0.29%	0
U.S. Taxpayers'	Howard Phillips	Herbert Titus	2,204	0.16%	0
Natural Law	Dr. John Hagelin	Dr. V. Tompkins	1,493	0.11%	0
Write-in	Ralph Nader	Winona LaDuke	701	0.05%	0
No party	Write-in		8	0.00%	0

=== Results by county ===
County	Bill Clinton Democratic		Bob Dole Republican		Ross Perot Reform		Various candidates Other parties		Margin		Total votes cast
County	#	%	#	%	#	%	#	%	#	%	Total votes cast
Adair	1,821	27.85%	3,876	59.28%	790	12.08%	51	0.78%	-2,055	-31.43%	6,538
Allen	1,781	34.05%	3,032	57.97%	393	7.51%	24	0.46%	-1,251	-23.92%	5,230
Anderson	2,898	43.56%	2,972	44.67%	751	11.29%	32	0.48%	-74	-1.11%	6,653
Ballard	2,255	60.26%	1,064	28.43%	411	10.98%	12	0.32%	1,191	31.83%	3,742
Barren	5,044	42.59%	5,700	48.13%	1,065	8.99%	35	0.30%	-656	-5.54%	11,844
Bath	1,886	52.83%	1,229	34.43%	428	11.99%	27	0.76%	657	18.40%	3,570
Bell	5,058	50.54%	3,917	39.14%	940	9.39%	93	0.93%	1,141	11.40%	10,008
Boone	8,379	32.72%	15,085	58.91%	1,900	7.42%	243	0.95%	-6,706	-26.19%	25,607
Bourbon	3,030	48.42%	2,592	41.42%	603	9.64%	33	0.53%	438	7.00%	6,258
Boyd	9,668	51.17%	7,054	37.34%	2,070	10.96%	101	0.53%	2,614	13.83%	18,893
Boyle	3,877	44.15%	4,157	47.34%	709	8.07%	39	0.44%	-280	-3.19%	8,782
Bracken	1,055	38.79%	1,371	50.40%	271	9.96%	23	0.85%	-316	-11.61%	2,720
Breathitt	3,106	67.85%	1,058	23.11%	397	8.67%	17	0.37%	2,048	44.74%	4,578
Breckinridge	2,956	43.49%	3,151	46.36%	670	9.86%	20	0.29%	-195	-2.87%	6,797
Bullitt	7,651	41.59%	8,697	47.28%	1,973	10.73%	74	0.40%	-1,046	-5.69%	18,395
Butler	1,260	30.37%	2,531	61.00%	348	8.39%	10	0.24%	-1,271	-30.63%	4,149
Caldwell	2,434	47.22%	2,067	40.10%	637	12.36%	17	0.33%	367	7.12%	5,155
Calloway	5,281	45.66%	4,989	43.14%	1,223	10.57%	73	0.63%	292	2.52%	11,566
Campbell	11,957	38.30%	16,640	53.31%	2,312	7.41%	307	0.98%	-4,683	-15.01%	31,216
Carlisle	1,355	55.83%	816	33.62%	245	10.09%	11	0.45%	539	22.21%	2,427
Carroll	1,689	52.18%	1,170	36.14%	351	10.84%	27	0.83%	519	16.04%	3,237
Carter	3,728	47.97%	3,240	41.69%	781	10.05%	22	0.28%	488	6.28%	7,771
Casey	1,106	22.70%	3,187	65.40%	525	10.77%	55	1.13%	-2,081	-42.70%	4,873
Christian	6,843	42.08%	8,285	50.95%	1,064	6.54%	68	0.42%	-1,442	-8.87%	16,260
Clark	4,987	45.77%	4,739	43.49%	1,095	10.05%	75	0.69%	248	2.28%	10,896
Clay	2,135	33.35%	3,716	58.05%	478	7.47%	72	1.12%	-1,581	-24.70%	6,401
Clinton	1,072	26.96%	2,521	63.41%	350	8.80%	33	0.83%	-1,449	-36.45%	3,976
Crittenden	1,480	43.48%	1,509	44.33%	400	11.75%	15	0.44%	-29	-0.85%	3,404
Cumberland	753	28.29%	1,654	62.13%	227	8.53%	28	1.05%	-901	-33.84%	2,662
Daviess	15,366	43.99%	15,844	45.36%	3,344	9.57%	376	1.08%	-478	-1.37%	34,930
Edmonson	1,595	35.30%	2,619	57.96%	298	6.59%	7	0.15%	-1,024	-22.66%	4,519
Elliott	1,298	64.42%	421	20.89%	284	14.09%	12	0.60%	877	43.53%	2,015
Estill	1,724	38.74%	2,220	49.89%	479	10.76%	27	0.61%	-496	-11.15%	4,450
Fayette	43,632	47.09%	42,930	46.33%	5,345	5.77%	757	0.82%	702	0.76%	92,664
Fleming	1,913	40.16%	2,313	48.55%	522	10.96%	16	0.34%	-400	-8.39%	4,764
Floyd	9,655	67.12%	3,139	21.82%	1,518	10.55%	72	0.50%	6,516	45.30%	14,384
Franklin	11,251	55.24%	7,132	35.02%	1,873	9.20%	111	0.54%	4,119	20.22%	20,367
Fulton	1,614	59.56%	863	31.85%	223	8.23%	10	0.37%	751	27.71%	2,710
Gallatin	1,189	50.68%	838	35.72%	299	12.75%	20	0.85%	351	14.96%	2,346
Garrard	1,486	34.00%	2,540	58.11%	337	7.71%	8	0.18%	-1,054	-24.11%	4,371
Grant	2,541	42.80%	2,697	45.43%	661	11.13%	38	0.64%	-156	-2.63%	5,937
Graves	6,991	50.65%	5,130	37.17%	1,596	11.56%	86	0.62%	1,861	13.48%	13,803
Grayson	2,716	35.17%	4,249	55.02%	677	8.77%	80	1.04%	-1,533	-19.85%	7,722
Green	1,285	28.30%	2,763	60.86%	475	10.46%	17	0.37%	-1,478	-32.56%	4,540
Greenup	6,883	49.32%	5,370	38.48%	1,627	11.66%	76	0.54%	1,513	10.84%	13,956
Hancock	1,547	46.33%	1,356	40.61%	418	12.52%	18	0.54%	191	5.72%	3,339
Hardin	11,031	41.44%	12,642	47.50%	2,815	10.58%	129	0.48%	-1,611	-6.06%	26,617
Harlan	5,874	58.00%	3,337	32.95%	884	8.73%	32	0.32%	2,537	25.05%	10,127
Harrison	2,934	47.29%	2,433	39.22%	801	12.91%	36	0.58%	501	8.07%	6,204
Hart	2,527	43.89%	2,701	46.91%	501	8.70%	29	0.50%	-174	-3.02%	5,758
Henderson	8,051	54.38%	5,092	34.39%	1,556	10.51%	107	0.72%	2,959	19.99%	14,806
Henry	2,324	46.39%	2,110	42.12%	564	11.26%	12	0.24%	214	4.27%	5,010
Hickman	1,220	56.14%	695	31.98%	247	11.37%	11	0.51%	525	24.16%	2,173
Hopkins	7,239	47.66%	6,363	41.89%	1,512	9.95%	76	0.50%	876	5.77%	15,190
Jackson	960	22.06%	3,045	69.98%	299	6.87%	47	1.08%	-2,085	-47.92%	4,351
Jefferson	144,207	51.52%	114,860	41.03%	19,413	6.94%	1,433	0.51%	29,347	10.49%	279,913
Jessamine	4,428	36.27%	6,686	54.76%	1,040	8.52%	56	0.46%	-2,258	-18.49%	12,210
Johnson	3,348	43.68%	3,262	42.56%	1,010	13.18%	44	0.57%	86	1.12%	7,664
Kenton	19,407	37.19%	28,579	54.77%	3,680	7.05%	514	0.99%	-9,172	-17.58%	52,180
Knott	4,842	73.29%	1,201	18.18%	517	7.83%	47	0.71%	3,641	55.11%	6,607
Knox	3,736	41.08%	4,502	49.50%	811	8.92%	46	0.51%	-766	-8.42%	9,095
LaRue	2,040	43.80%	2,140	45.94%	469	10.07%	9	0.19%	-100	-2.14%	4,658
Laurel	4,306	28.54%	9,454	62.65%	1,211	8.03%	119	0.79%	-5,148	-34.11%	15,090
Lawrence	2,195	48.75%	1,812	40.24%	481	10.68%	15	0.33%	383	8.51%	4,503
Lee	1,023	40.56%	1,302	51.63%	181	7.18%	16	0.63%	-279	-11.07%	2,522
Leslie	1,466	35.84%	2,296	56.14%	304	7.43%	24	0.59%	-830	-20.30%	4,090
Letcher	4,160	57.57%	2,222	30.75%	782	10.82%	62	0.86%	1,938	26.82%	7,226
Lewis	1,415	32.38%	2,365	54.12%	561	12.84%	29	0.66%	-950	-21.74%	4,370
Lincoln	2,550	41.73%	3,006	49.19%	526	8.61%	29	0.47%	-456	-7.46%	6,111
Livingston	2,228	56.15%	1,258	31.70%	449	11.32%	33	0.83%	970	24.45%	3,968
Logan	4,181	47.47%	3,888	44.15%	704	7.99%	34	0.39%	293	3.32%	8,807
Lyon	1,641	55.89%	999	34.03%	284	9.67%	12	0.41%	642	21.86%	2,936
Madison	8,142	42.62%	9,212	48.23%	1,613	8.44%	135	0.71%	-1,070	-5.61%	19,102
Magoffin	2,249	55.60%	1,434	35.45%	337	8.33%	25	0.62%	815	20.15%	4,045
Marion	2,922	51.17%	2,013	35.25%	757	13.26%	18	0.32%	909	15.92%	5,710
Marshall	6,054	50.12%	4,579	37.91%	1,391	11.52%	54	0.45%	1,475	12.21%	12,078
Martin	1,807	47.00%	1,612	41.92%	401	10.43%	25	0.65%	195	5.08%	3,845
Mason	2,444	44.12%	2,588	46.72%	484	8.74%	23	0.42%	-144	-2.60%	5,539
McCracken	12,670	50.10%	10,221	40.42%	2,268	8.97%	128	0.51%	2,449	9.68%	25,287
McCreary	1,710	35.66%	2,527	52.70%	488	10.18%	70	1.46%	-817	-17.04%	4,795
McLean	1,834	51.02%	1,368	38.05%	385	10.71%	8	0.22%	466	12.97%	3,595
Meade	3,653	49.04%	2,855	38.33%	912	12.24%	29	0.39%	798	10.71%	7,449
Menifee	979	54.97%	608	34.14%	179	10.05%	15	0.84%	371	20.83%	1,781
Mercer	3,179	43.66%	3,264	44.82%	738	10.13%	101	1.39%	-85	-1.16%	7,282
Metcalfe	1,349	39.95%	1,651	48.89%	355	10.51%	22	0.65%	-302	-8.94%	3,377
Monroe	1,114	22.96%	3,300	68.03%	415	8.55%	22	0.45%	-2,186	-45.07%	4,851
Montgomery	3,372	49.62%	2,681	39.45%	705	10.37%	38	0.56%	691	10.17%	6,796
Morgan	1,843	49.88%	1,439	38.94%	380	10.28%	33	0.89%	404	10.94%	3,695
Muhlenberg	6,564	57.65%	3,569	31.35%	1,218	10.70%	35	0.31%	2,995	26.30%	11,386
Nelson	5,392	48.32%	4,645	41.63%	1,067	9.56%	55	0.49%	747	6.69%	11,159
Nicholas	1,092	47.25%	950	41.11%	265	11.47%	4	0.17%	142	6.14%	2,311
Ohio	3,487	43.20%	3,475	43.05%	1,076	13.33%	34	0.42%	12	0.15%	8,072
Oldham	6,202	33.89%	10,477	57.25%	1,521	8.31%	101	0.55%	-4,275	-23.36%	18,301
Owen	1,603	42.23%	1,709	45.02%	454	11.96%	30	0.79%	-106	-2.79%	3,796
Owsley	647	37.44%	920	53.24%	153	8.85%	8	0.46%	-273	-15.80%	1,728
Pendleton	1,926	41.76%	2,177	47.20%	462	10.02%	47	1.02%	-251	-5.44%	4,612
Perry	6,015	58.27%	3,382	32.76%	894	8.66%	32	0.31%	2,633	25.51%	10,323
Pike	14,126	60.12%	7,160	30.47%	2,148	9.14%	61	0.26%	6,966	29.65%	23,495
Powell	2,156	50.86%	1,526	36.00%	523	12.34%	34	0.80%	630	14.86%	4,239
Pulaski	5,340	28.36%	11,945	63.44%	1,420	7.54%	124	0.66%	-6,605	-35.08%	18,829
Robertson	360	42.35%	368	43.29%	117	13.76%	5	0.59%	-8	-0.94%	850
Rockcastle	1,160	24.95%	3,106	66.80%	338	7.27%	46	0.99%	-1,946	-41.85%	4,650
Rowan	3,215	51.00%	2,309	36.63%	724	11.48%	56	0.89%	906	14.37%	6,304
Russell	1,582	24.50%	4,017	62.22%	837	12.96%	20	0.31%	-2,435	-37.72%	6,456
Scott	4,258	44.28%	4,349	45.23%	977	10.16%	31	0.32%	-91	-0.95%	9,615
Shelby	4,629	43.02%	5,307	49.32%	780	7.25%	45	0.42%	-678	-6.30%	10,761
Simpson	2,749	51.31%	2,186	40.80%	401	7.48%	22	0.41%	563	10.51%	5,358
Spencer	1,404	41.69%	1,614	47.92%	341	10.12%	9	0.27%	-210	-6.23%	3,368
Taylor	2,897	34.76%	4,573	54.87%	829	9.95%	36	0.43%	-1,676	-20.11%	8,335
Todd	1,744	42.35%	1,912	46.43%	424	10.30%	38	0.92%	-168	-4.08%	4,118
Trigg	2,087	46.65%	1,975	44.14%	394	8.81%	18	0.40%	112	2.51%	4,474
Trimble	1,245	48.48%	999	38.90%	308	11.99%	16	0.62%	246	9.58%	2,568
Union	2,913	57.30%	1,554	30.57%	598	11.76%	19	0.37%	1,359	26.73%	5,084
Warren	11,642	39.59%	15,784	53.68%	1,835	6.24%	145	0.49%	-4,142	-14.09%	29,406
Washington	1,639	39.39%	2,116	50.85%	383	9.20%	23	0.55%	-477	-11.46%	4,161
Wayne	2,422	40.00%	3,122	51.56%	481	7.94%	30	0.50%	-700	-11.56%	6,055
Webster	2,852	55.90%	1,568	30.73%	660	12.94%	22	0.43%	1,284	25.17%	5,102
Whitley	4,174	39.08%	5,402	50.58%	1,027	9.62%	77	0.72%	-1,228	-11.50%	10,680
Wolfe	1,297	56.46%	772	33.61%	202	8.79%	26	1.13%	525	22.85%	2,297
Woodford	3,910	43.56%	4,270	47.57%	746	8.31%	51	0.57%	-360	-4.01%	8,977
Total	636,614	45.84%	623,283	44.88%	120,396	8.67%	8,415	0.61%	13,331	0.96%	1,388,708

==== Counties that flipped from Democratic to Republican ====
- Barren
- Bracken
- Breckinridge
- Bullitt
- Crittenden
- Daviess
- Fleming
- Hart
- Larue
- Mason
- Metcalfe
- Owen
- Robertson
- Spencer
- Todd

==== Counties that flipped from Republican to Democratic ====
- Fayette
- Martin

=== By congressional district ===
Clinton won four of six districts, including three which elected Republicans, while the other two were won by Dole.

District	Clinton	Dole	Perot	Representative
1st	47%	43%	10%	Ed Whitfield
2nd	41%	49%	10%	Ron Lewis
3rd	53%	40%	7%	Mike Ward
3rd	53%	40%	7%	Anne Northup
4th	41%	50%	9%	Jim Bunning
5th	47%	44%	9%	Hal Rogers
6th	46.4%	45.5%	8%	Scotty Baesler

== See also ==
- United States Senate election in Kentucky, 1996
