= Turkeytown =

Turkeytown may refer to:

- Turkeytown (Cherokee town), a Native American settlement in what is now Tennessee
- Turkeytown, Kentucky, an unincorporated community in Lincoln County
- Turkeytown, Pennsylvania, a village in Westmoreland County

== See also ==
- Treaty of Turkeytown, 14 September 1816
