= Chicken Bristle =

Chicken Bristle may refer to:

- Chicken Bristle, Illinois, an unincorporated community in Douglas County
- Chicken Bristle, Kentucky, an unincorporated community located in Lincoln County
