= Walnut Flat, Kentucky =

Unincorporated community in Kentucky, United States

- Unincorporated community
- Location in Kentucky Location in the United States
- Coordinates: 37°29′43″N 84°34′44″W
- Country: United States
- State: Kentucky
- County: Lincoln
- Elevation: 942 ft (287 m)
- Time zone: UTC-5 (Eastern (EST))
  - Summer (DST): UTC-4 (EDT)
- GNIS feature ID: 509308

Walnut Flat is an unincorporated community located in Lincoln County, Kentucky, United States.
