= Buttonsberry, Kentucky =

Unincorporated community in Kentucky, United States

- Unincorporated community
- Location within Kentucky Location within the United States
- Coordinates: 37°26′48″N 87°10′7″W
- Country: United States
- State: Kentucky
- County: McLean
- Elevation: 427 ft (130 m)
- Time zone: UTC-6 (Central (CST))
  - Summer (DST): UTC-5 (CDT)
- GNIS feature ID: 507632

Buttonsberry is an unincorporated community located in McLean County, Kentucky, United States. It was also known as Karnes Station. The etymology refers to finding a button nearby while picking berries.
