= Wyman, Kentucky =

Unincorporated community in Kentucky, United States

- Unincorporated community
- Location within Kentucky Location within the United States
- Coordinates: 37°37′56″N 87°19′57″W
- Country: United States
- State: Kentucky
- County: McLean
- Elevation: 466 ft (142 m)
- Time zone: UTC-6 (Central (CST))
  - Summer (DST): UTC-5 (CDT)
- GNIS feature ID: 509414

Wyman is an unincorporated community located in McLean County, Kentucky, United States.
