= Lemon, Kentucky =

Unincorporated community in Kentucky, United States

- Unincorporated community
- Location within Kentucky Location within the United States
- Coordinates: 37°34′52″N 87°22′42″W
- Country: United States
- State: Kentucky
- County: McLean
- Elevation: 377 ft (115 m)
- Time zone: UTC-6 (Central (CST))
  - Summer (DST): UTC-5 (CDT)
- GNIS feature ID: 508443

Lemon is an unincorporated community located in McLean County, Kentucky, United States. It was also called Whitesburg with at least one old house from American Civil War era.
