= Lincoln County Courthouse (Kentucky) =

- U.S. National Register of Historic Places
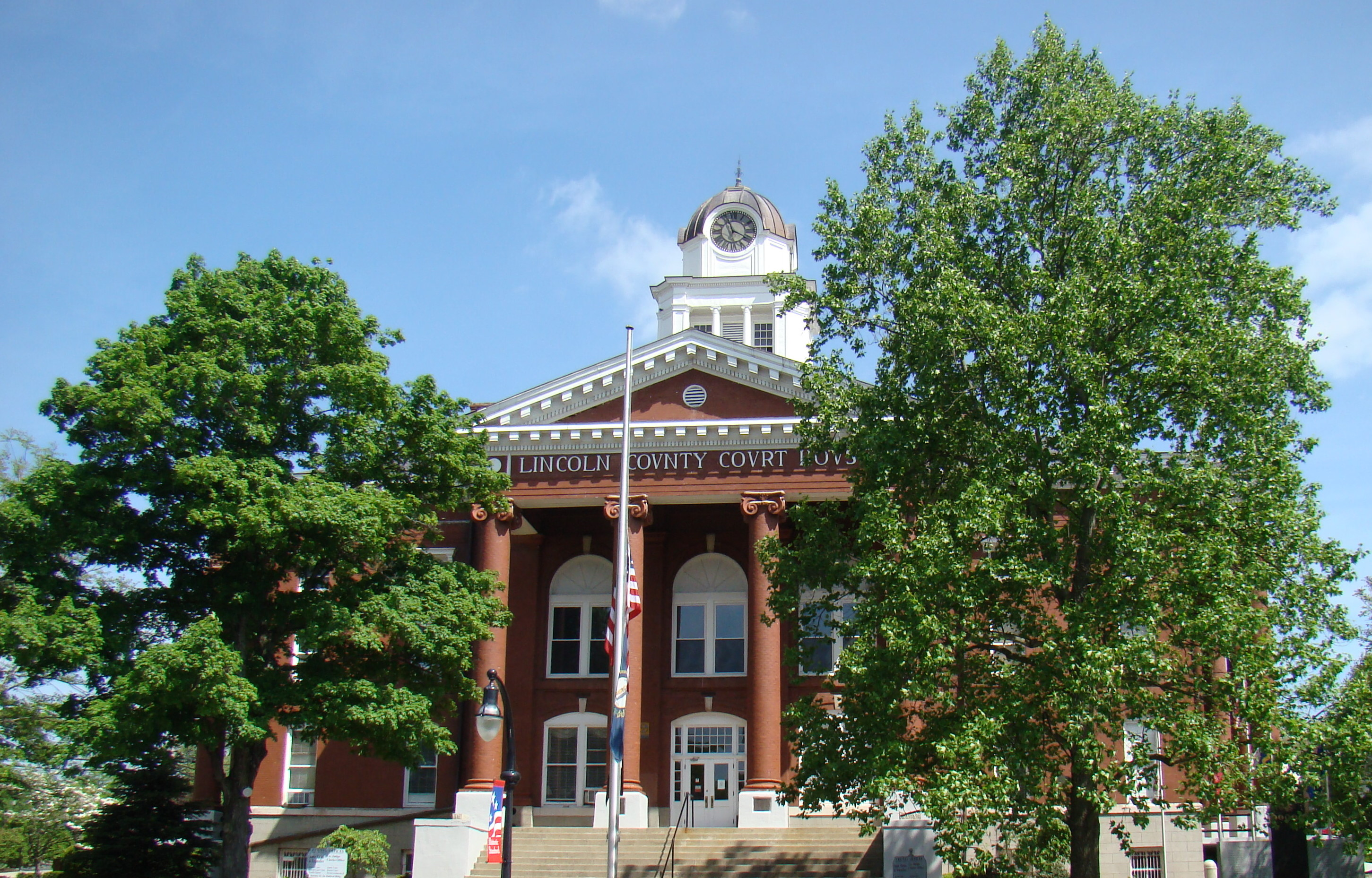
- Lincoln County Courthouse

- Location within Kentucky Location within the United States
- Location: Stanford, Kentucky
- Coordinates: 37°31′47″N 84°39′41″W
- Built: 1909
- Built by: F. Krueger & Sons
- Architect: Milburn, Heister & Company
- Architectural style: classical Beaux-Arts
- NRHP reference No.: 76000915
- Added to NRHP: April 22, 1976

Lincoln County Courthouse is the building in Stanford, Kentucky, the county seat of Lincoln County, where trial courts conduct their affairs, and other county governmental offices are located. The building was added to the United States National Register of Historic Places in 1976.

== History ==
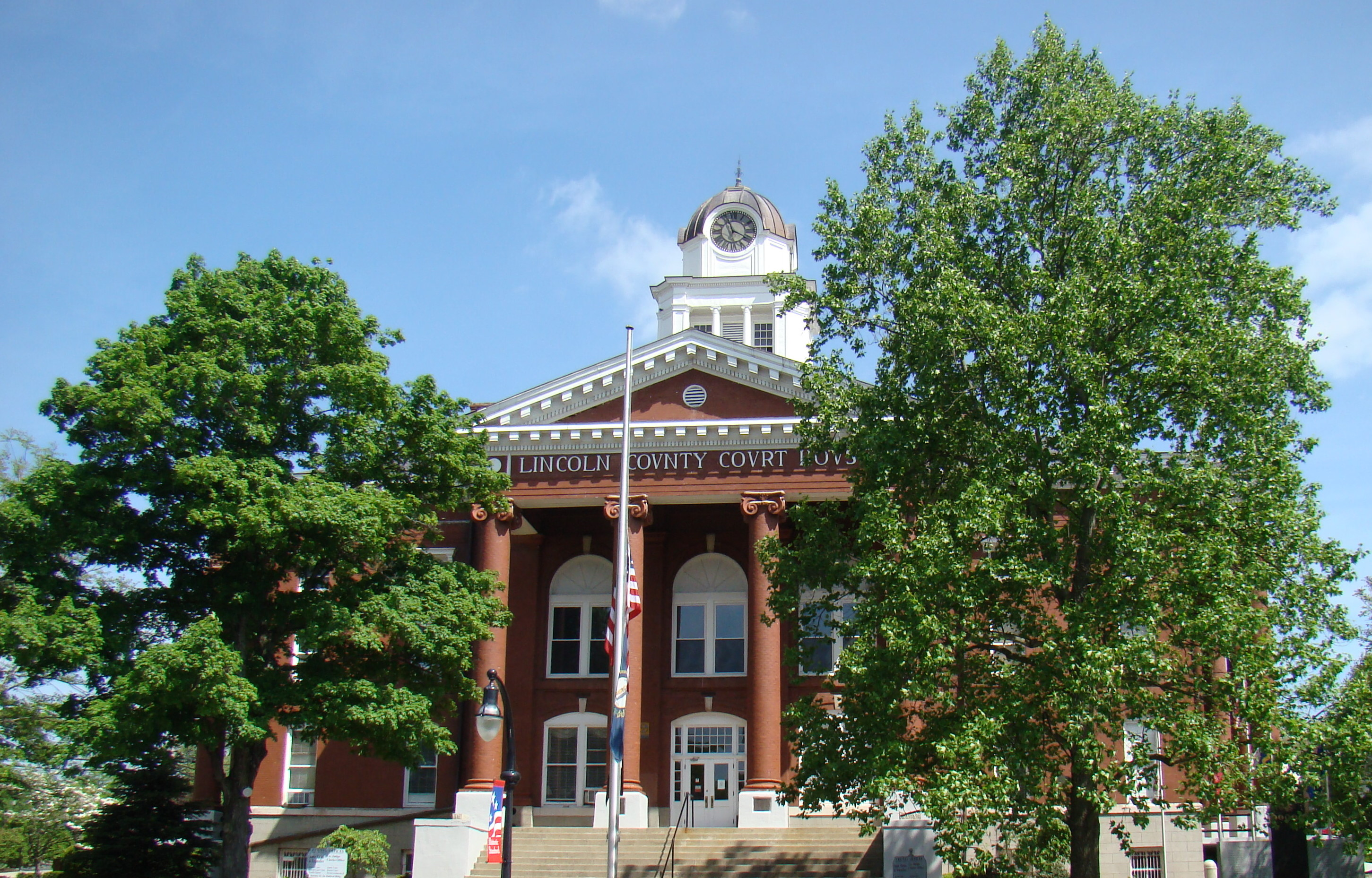
Lincoln County Courthouse

Stanford, originally called Logan's Fort, was named the county seat of Lincoln County in 1786. The current building was constructed in 1909 at the site of the original building. This structure was the fourth building used as courthouse.

Never destroyed by fire or flooding, the courthouse contains original documents dating back to 1781, and are the oldest courthouse records in the state.

== Architecture ==
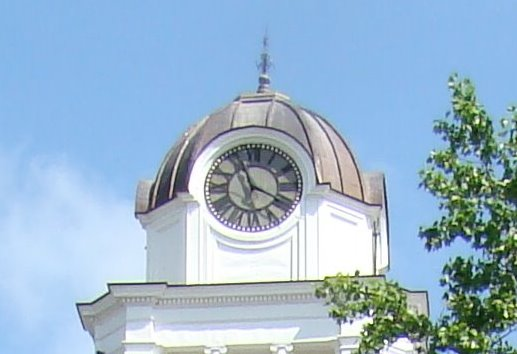
Cupola

Constructed in the Beaux-Arts architectural style, the building features include a cupola with a clock on each side at the top of the building. The Ionic order portico fronting includes round brick columns.
