= Nuckols, Kentucky =

Unincorporated community in Kentucky, United States

- Unincorporated community
- Location within Kentucky Location within the United States
- Coordinates: 37°31′24″N 87°6′44″W
- Country: United States
- State: Kentucky
- County: McLean
- Elevation: 404 ft (123 m)
- Time zone: UTC-6 (Central (CST))
  - Summer (DST): UTC-5 (CDT)
- GNIS feature ID: 499630

Nuckols is an unincorporated community located in McLean County, Kentucky, United States.

A post office called Nuckols was established in 1895, and remained in operation until 1974. The community has the name of Neverson Nuckols, an early settler.
