= Congleton, McLean County, Kentucky =

Unincorporated community in Kentucky, United States

Coordinates: 37°36′33″N 87°26′58″W

Congleton is an unincorporated community in McLean County, in the U.S. state of Kentucky.

== History ==
A post office called Congleton was established in 1887, and remained in operation until it was discontinued in 1914.
