= Miracle, Lincoln County, Kentucky =

Unincorporated community in Kentucky, United States

Miracle
- Unincorporated community
- Location in Kentucky Location in the United States
- Coordinates: 37°28′0″N 84°40′57″W
- Country: United States
- State: Kentucky
- County: Lincoln
- Elevation: 1,109 ft (338 m)
- Time zone: UTC-5 (Eastern (EST))
  - Summer (DST): UTC-4 (EDT)
- GNIS feature ID: 508618

Miracle is an unincorporated community located in Lincoln County, Kentucky, United States.
