= Cleopatra, Kentucky =

Unincorporated community in Kentucky, United States

- Unincorporated community
- Location within Kentucky Location within the United States
- Coordinates: 37°37′20″N 87°17′34″W
- Country: United States
- State: Kentucky
- County: McLean
- Elevation: 453 ft (138 m)
- Time zone: UTC-6 (Central (CST))
  - Summer (DST): UTC-5 (CDT)
- GNIS feature ID: 507714

Cleopatra is an unincorporated community located in McLean County, Kentucky, United States. It was also known as Tichenors Store. Thomas Cicero (T.C.) Tichenor established a store in 1867. Cleopatra was incorporated by the Commonwealth of Kentucky in 1862. The boundaries of the town were defined as half a mile in each of four directions from a stone in front of Tichenors Store. The 1884 edition of the Kentucky State Gazetteer and Business Directory describes Cleopatra as having a population of 50 with semi-weekly mail service. Tichenor served as the postmaster. Other enterprises listed include M.D. Bandy, blacksmith; Reverend J. A. Brooks (Baptist preacher); A B. Hadon, grocer; J.F. McGuin, carpenter; G.W. Moseley, flour mill; Sherwood Massey, coal miner; C.R. Robertson, physician and W.K. Robertson, pharmacist. Tichenors store is described as a dry goods store. Tichenor eventually sold his store to a brother-in-law, James Fincastle "Fin" Short who eventually sold to Courtland Lee (C.L.) Short. The building burned in 1918. In 1923, Mr. and Mrs. W. E. Leachman converted a lodge hall into a store.
