= McLean County News =

- Type: Weekly newspaper
- Format: Broadsheet
- Owner: Paxton Media Group
- Publisher: Mike Weafer
- Editor: Megan Purazrang
- Founded: 1883
- Headquarters: Calhoun, Kentucky
- Website: mcleannews.com

The McLean County News is a broadsheet weekly newspaper based in Calhoun, Kentucky, and serving the entire McLean County area in northwest Kentucky. Its coverage area includes Calhoun, Sacramento, Livermore, Beech Grove Island, and Rumsey. The newspaper is also sold at a convenience store in the Daviess County community of Utica due to its close proximity to Daviess County's southwest border with McLean County.

Its first edition was believed to be published in 1883.

It is owned and operated by Paxton Media Group via the Messenger-Inquirer of Owensboro, Kentucky
