= Preachersville, Kentucky =

Unincorporated community in Kentucky, United States

- Unincorporated community
- Location in Kentucky Location in the United States
- Coordinates: 37°31′38″N 84°32′2″W
- Country: United States
- State: Kentucky
- County: Lincoln
- Elevation: 988 ft (301 m)
- Time zone: UTC-5 (Eastern (EST))
  - Summer (DST): UTC-4 (EDT)
- GNIS feature ID: 508870

Preachersville is an unincorporated community located in Lincoln County, Kentucky, United States.

The post office was established on May 18, 1854, and named for the many preachers who lived in the area. William H. Newton was the first postmaster. It closed in May 1911.
