= Guffie, Kentucky =

Unincorporated community in Kentucky, United States

- Unincorporated community
- Location within Kentucky Location within the United States
- Coordinates: 37°36′15″N 87°15′16″W
- Country: United States
- State: Kentucky
- County: McLean
- Elevation: 436 ft (133 m)
- Time zone: UTC-6 (Central (CST))
  - Summer (DST): UTC-5 (CDT)
- GNIS feature ID: 508145

Guffie is an unincorporated community located in McLean County, Kentucky, United States. It was also known as Littles Crossroads.

In 2017 Guffie Lake (operated by the local fish and game) had a catastrophic Dam breach. Resulting in the lake completely draining. The cause is unknown at this time and repairs to the Dam have not yet taken place. No injuries were reported.
