= Chicken Bristle, Kentucky =

Unincorporated community in Kentucky, United States

- Unincorporated community
- Location in Kentucky Location in the United States
- Coordinates: 37°29′9″N 84°46′12″W
- Country: United States
- State: Kentucky
- County: Lincoln
- Elevation: 938 ft (286 m)
- Time zone: UTC-5 (Eastern (CST))
  - Summer (DST): UTC-4 (EDT)
- GNIS feature ID: 507696

Chicken Bristle is an unincorporated community located in Lincoln County, Kentucky, United States.

The community, which is historically African-American, had an estimated population of ten residents in 2006. The origin of its name is unclear.
