= 1996 Kentucky Democratic presidential primary =

- May 28, 1996

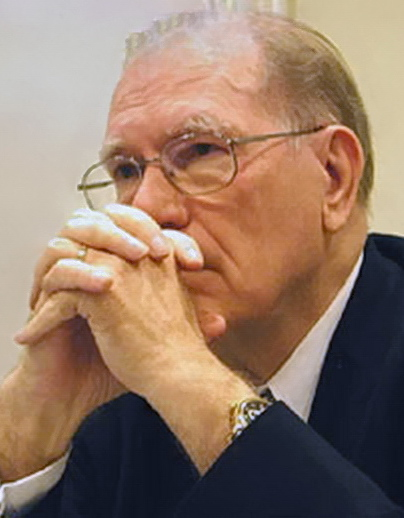
Candidate	Bill Clinton	Uncommitted	Lyndon LaRouche
Home state	Arkansas	–	Virginia
Popular vote	211,667	44,028	20,324
Percentage	76.68%	15.95%	7.36%
- County results Clinton: 60–65% 65–70% 70–75% 75–80% 80–85% 85–90%

The 1996 Kentucky Democratic presidential primary was held on March 21, 1996, as one of the Democratic Party's statewide nomination contests ahead of the 1996 presidential election. Incumbent President Bill Clinton easily won the primary, facing only minor opposition.

== Results ==
1996 Kentucky Democratic Primary
Candidate	Votes	%
Bill Clinton	211,667	76.68%
Uncommitted	44,028	15.95%
Lyndon LaRouche	20,324	7.36%
Total	276,019	100%
