= Semiway, Kentucky =

Unincorporated community in Kentucky, United States

- Unincorporated community
- Location within Kentucky Location within the United States
- Coordinates: 37°28′24″N 87°14′28″W
- Country: United States
- State: Kentucky
- County: McLean
- Elevation: 390 ft (120 m)
- Time zone: UTC-6 (Central (CST))
  - Summer (DST): UTC-5 (CDT)
- GNIS feature ID: 509031

Semiway is an unincorporated community located in McLean County, Kentucky, United States.

It is reportedly named for being located at a "semi" distance between Calhoun and Sacramento.
