= Lincoln County, Kentucky =

County in Kentucky, United States

- County
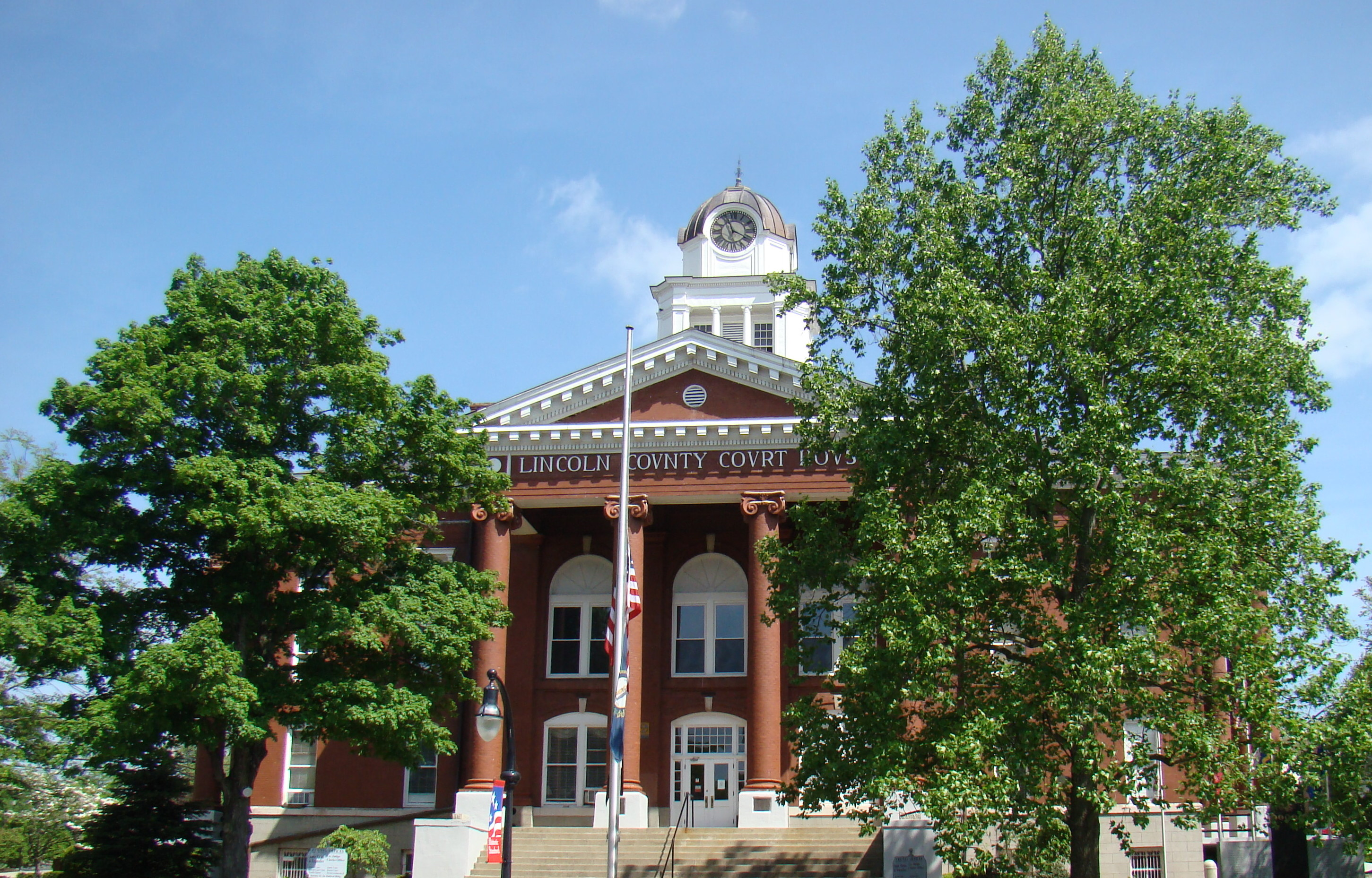
- Lincoln County courthouse in Stanford

- Location within the U.S. state of Kentucky
- Coordinates: 37°28′N 84°40′W
- Country: United States
- State: Kentucky
- Founded: 1780
- Named for: Benjamin Lincoln
- Seat: Stanford
- Largest city: Stanford

Government
  - Judge/Executive: J. Woods Adams III (R)

Area
  - Total: 337 sq mi (870 km^{2})
  - Land: 334 sq mi (870 km^{2})
  - Water: 2.5 sq mi (6.5 km^{2}) 0.7%

Population (2020)
  - Total: 24,275
  - Estimate (2025): 25,353 ▲
  - Density: 74.6/sq mi (28.8/km^{2})
- Time zone: UTC−5 (Eastern)
  - Summer (DST): UTC−4 (EDT)
- Congressional district: 5th
- Website: www.lincolnky.com

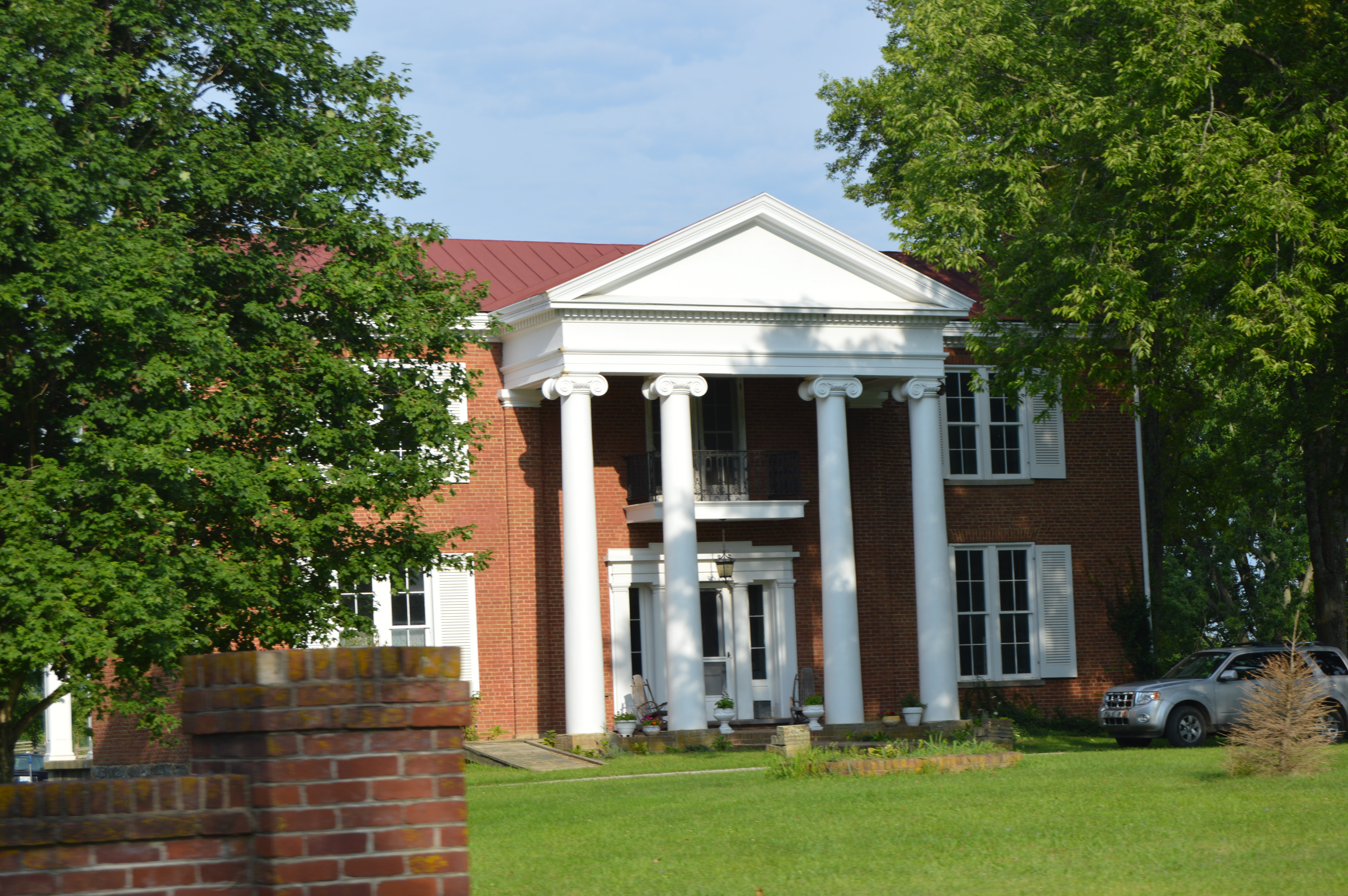
Historic Thomas Montgomery House in Stanford

Lincoln County is a county located in south-central Kentucky. As of the 2020 census, the population was 24,275. Its county seat is Stanford. Lincoln County is part of the Danville, KY Micropolitan Statistical Area.

== History ==
Lincoln County—originally Lincoln County, Virginia—was established by the Virginia General Assembly in June 1780, and named in honor of Revolutionary War general Benjamin Lincoln. It was one of three counties formed out of Virginia's Kentucky County (The other two were Fayette and Jefferson), and is one of Kentucky's nine original counties.

The county's original seat was at Harrodsburg; but in 1785, Lincoln County was partitioned, and Harrodsburg became the seat of the new Mercer County. Afterward, Stanford became Lincoln County's permanent seat.

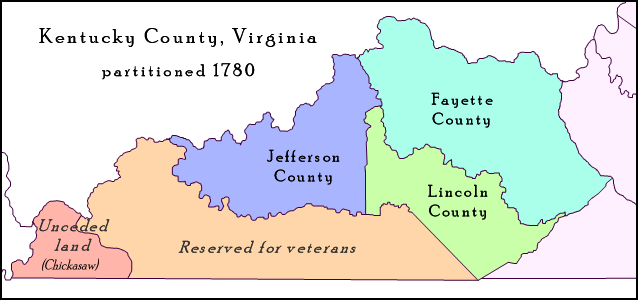
Lincoln County was formed in 1780, when the Virginia General Assembly partitioned Kentucky County.

== Geography ==
According to the United States Census Bureau, the county has a total area of 337 square miles (870 km^{2}), of which 334 square miles (870 km^{2}) is land and 2.5 square miles (6.5 km^{2}) (0.7%) is water.

Lincoln County is located in south-central Kentucky astride the southern part of the ring of Knobs, which separate the Bluegrass region from the Eastern Pennyroyal Plateau, the Lincoln County part of which includes the source and headwaters of the Green River. Lincoln County is part of Appalachia.

=== Adjacent counties ===
- Boyle County (northwest)
- Garrard County (northeast)
- Rockcastle County (east)
- Pulaski County (south)
- Casey County (west)

== Demographics ==
Historical population
Census	Pop.	Note	%±
1790	6,548		—
1800	8,621		31.7%
1810	8,676		0.6%
1820	9,979		15.0%
1830	11,002		10.3%
1840	10,187		−7.4%
1850	10,093		−0.9%
1860	10,647		5.5%
1870	10,947		2.8%
1880	15,080		37.8%
1890	15,962		5.8%
1900	17,059		6.9%
1910	17,897		4.9%
1920	16,481		−7.9%
1930	17,687		7.3%
1940	19,859		12.3%
1950	18,668		−6.0%
1960	16,503		−11.6%
1970	16,663		1.0%
1980	19,053		14.3%
1990	20,045		5.2%
2000	23,361		16.5%
2010	24,742		5.9%
2020	24,275		−1.9%
2025 (est.)	25,353	▲	4.4%
U.S. Decennial Census; 1790-1960 1900-1990; 1990-2000 2010-2020

=== 2020 census ===
As of the 2020 census, the county had a population of 24,275. The median age was 42.3 years. 23.5% of residents were under the age of 18 and 19.1% of residents were 65 years of age or older. For every 100 females there were 97.9 males, and for every 100 females age 18 and over there were 94.5 males age 18 and over.

The racial makeup of the county was 93.4% White, 1.9% Black or African American, 0.2% American Indian and Alaska Native, 0.2% Asian, 0.0% Native Hawaiian and Pacific Islander, 0.8% from some other race, and 3.5% from two or more races. Hispanic or Latino residents of any race comprised 2.0% of the population.

0.1% of residents lived in urban areas, while 99.9% lived in rural areas.

There were 9,711 households in the county, of which 30.6% had children under the age of 18 living with them and 25.9% had a female householder with no spouse or partner present. About 27.0% of all households were made up of individuals and 13.0% had someone living alone who was 65 years of age or older.

There were 10,777 housing units, of which 9.9% were vacant. Among occupied housing units, 74.9% were owner-occupied and 25.1% were renter-occupied. The homeowner vacancy rate was 1.4% and the rental vacancy rate was 8.1%.

=== 2000 census ===
As of the census of 2000, there were 23,361 people, 9,206 households, and 6,729 families residing in the county. The population density was 70 per square mile (27/km^{2}). There were 10,127 housing units at an average density of 30 per square mile (12/km^{2}). The racial makeup of the county was 94.2% White, 2.53% Black or African American, 0.15% Native American, 0.10% Asian, 0.38% from other races, and 0.72% from two or more races. 0.89% of the population were Hispanic or Latino of any race.

There were 9,206 households, out of which 33.70% had children under the age of 18 living with them, 58.60% were married couples living together, 10.30% had a female householder with no husband present, and 26.90% were non-families. 23.60% of all households were made up of individuals, and 10.50% had someone living alone who was 65 years of age or older. The average household size was 2.51 and the average family size was 2.95.

By age, 25.70% of the population was under 18, 8.40% from 18 to 24, 29.80% from 25 to 44, 23.10% from 45 to 64, and 13.10% were 65 or older. The median age was 36 years. For every 100 females, there were 96.30 males. For every 100 females age 18 and over, there were 94.10 males.

The median income for a household in the county was $39,833, and the median income for a family was $32,284. Males had a median income of $26,395 versus $20,517 for females. The per capita income for the county was $13,602. About 16.40% of families and 21.10% of the population were below the poverty line, including 27.10% of those under age 18 and 22.90% of those age 65 or over.

== Communities ==
=== Cities ===
- Crab Orchard
- Eubank (shared with Pulaski County)
- Hustonville
- Junction City (mostly in Boyle County)
- Stanford (county seat)

=== Census-designated place ===
- McKinney

=== Other unincorporated places ===
- Blue Lick
- Chicken Bristle
- Dog Walk
- Halls Gap
- Highland
- Hubble
- Jumbo
- Kings Mountain
- Miracle
- Moreland
- Ottenheim
- Preachersville
- Rowland
- Turkeytown
- Walnut Flat
- Waynesburg

== Politics ==
United States presidential election results for Lincoln County, Kentucky
Year	Republican		Democratic		Third party(ies)	
Year	No.	%	No.	%	No.	%
1912	842	22.54%	1,863	49.87%	1,031	27.60%
1916	1,868	44.95%	2,212	53.22%	76	1.83%
1920	3,710	49.04%	3,787	50.05%	69	0.91%
1924	2,935	46.67%	3,100	49.29%	254	4.04%
1928	3,903	62.68%	2,314	37.16%	10	0.16%
1932	3,063	39.81%	4,574	59.44%	58	0.75%
1936	3,211	47.04%	3,575	52.37%	40	0.59%
1940	3,090	45.56%	3,657	53.91%	36	0.53%
1944	2,793	47.16%	3,087	52.13%	42	0.71%
1948	2,593	45.37%	2,920	51.09%	202	3.53%
1952	3,186	52.11%	2,910	47.60%	18	0.29%
1956	3,535	54.30%	2,953	45.36%	22	0.34%
1960	3,747	61.15%	2,381	38.85%	0	0.00%
1964	1,958	37.10%	3,307	62.67%	12	0.23%
1968	2,591	47.45%	1,736	31.79%	1,134	20.77%
1972	3,623	65.03%	1,882	33.78%	66	1.18%
1976	2,694	45.47%	3,198	53.97%	33	0.56%
1980	3,034	49.70%	2,991	48.99%	80	1.31%
1984	3,996	61.27%	2,498	38.30%	28	0.43%
1988	3,530	56.64%	2,677	42.96%	25	0.40%
1992	2,624	44.13%	2,532	42.58%	790	13.29%
1996	3,006	49.19%	2,550	41.73%	555	9.08%
2000	4,795	63.12%	2,678	35.25%	124	1.63%
2004	5,996	67.65%	2,796	31.55%	71	0.80%
2008	6,273	68.55%	2,752	30.07%	126	1.38%
2012	6,416	70.10%	2,582	28.21%	154	1.68%
2016	7,338	76.75%	1,865	19.51%	358	3.74%
2020	8,489	77.78%	2,254	20.65%	171	1.57%
2024	8,833	80.05%	2,080	18.85%	121	1.10%

Lincoln County has been reliably Republican for several decades now, last voting for a Democratic candidate for president in 1976.

=== Elected officials ===
Elected officials as of January 3, 2025
U.S. House	Hal Rogers (R)	KY 5
Ky. Senate	Brandon J. Storm (R)	21
Ky. House	David Meade (R)	80

== Education ==
There is one school district, the Lincoln County School District. The District includes Lincoln County High School.

== See also ==
- National Register of Historic Places listings in Lincoln County, Kentucky
