= McLean County, Kentucky =

County in Kentucky, United States

- County
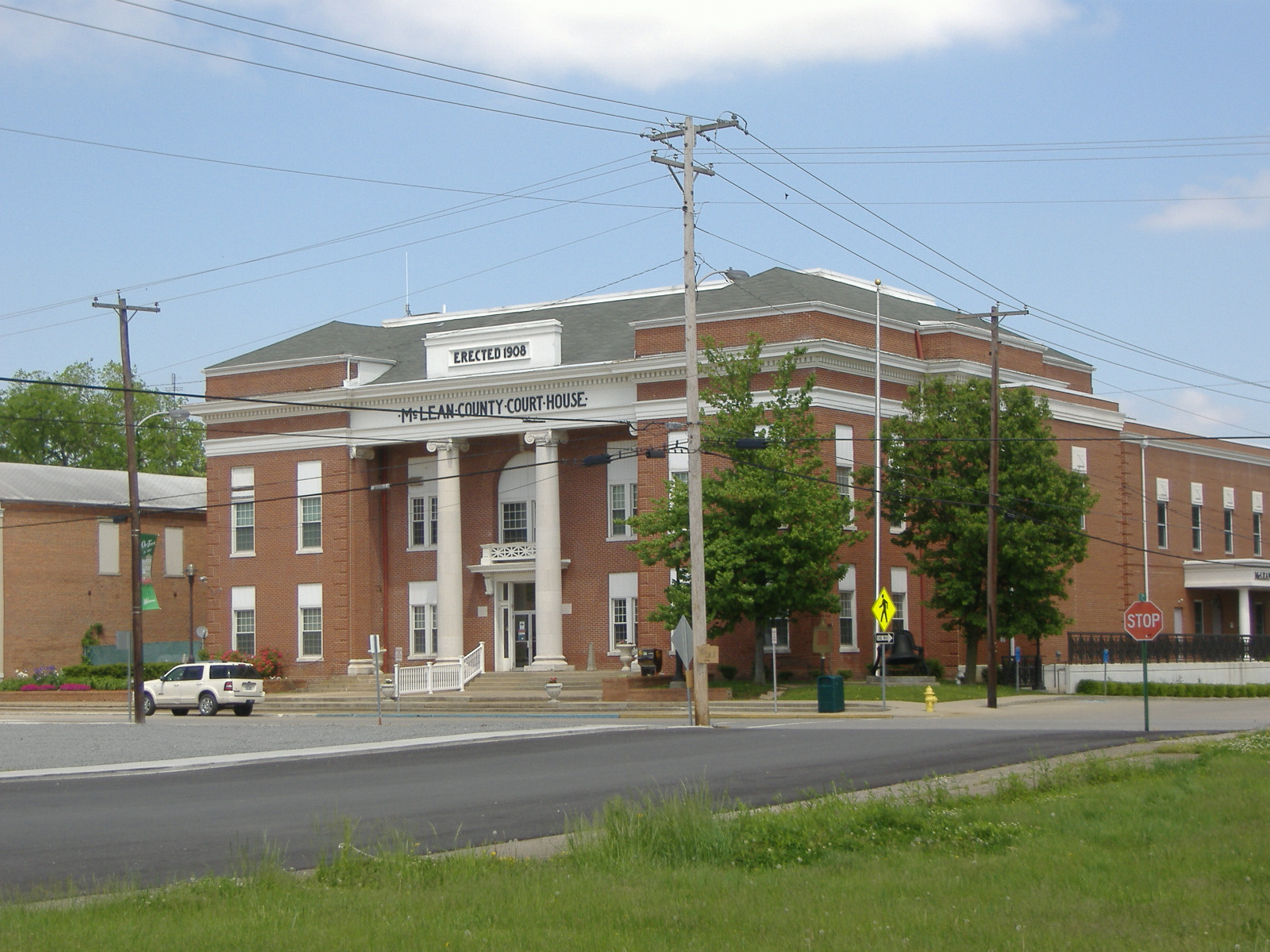
- McLean County Courthouse in Calhoun

- Location within the U.S. state of Kentucky
- Coordinates: 37°32′N 87°16′W
- Country: United States
- State: Kentucky
- Founded: 1854
- Named for: Alney McLean
- Seat: Calhoun
- Largest city: Livermore

Government
  - Judge/Executive: Curtis Dame (R)

Area
  - Total: 256 sq mi (660 km^{2})
  - Land: 252 sq mi (650 km^{2})
  - Water: 3.8 sq mi (9.8 km^{2}) 1.5%

Population (2020)
  - Total: 9,152
  - Estimate (2025): 9,064 ▼
  - Density: 36.3/sq mi (14.0/km^{2})
- Time zone: UTC−6 (Central)
  - Summer (DST): UTC−5 (CDT)
- Congressional district: 2nd
- Website: www.mcleancounty.ky.gov

McLean County (/məˈkleɪn/ mə-KLAYN) is a county located in the U.S. state of Kentucky. As of the 2020 census, the population was 9,152. Its county seat is Calhoun and its largest city is Livermore. McLean is a prohibition or dry county. McLean County is part of the Owensboro metropolitan area, which has a population of some 114,752 (2010 census).

== History ==
McLean County was formed by act of the Kentucky legislature on February 6, 1854, from portions of surrounding Daviess, Ohio, and Muhlenberg Counties. The county was named for Judge Alney McLean, founder of Greenville, the county seat of Muhlenberg County.

== Geography ==
According to the U.S. Census Bureau, the county has a total area of 256 square miles (660 km^{2}), of which 252 square miles (650 km^{2}) is land and 3.8 square miles (9.8 km^{2}) (1.5%) is water.

=== Features ===
McLean County is part of the Western Coal Fields region of Kentucky.

The county is transected southeast to northwest by Green River, the longest river entirely within the Commonwealth of Kentucky. Bridge crossings of Green River are at Calhoun, Livermore, east of Island, and west of Beech Grove. Green River is navigable throughout McLean County, with Army Corps of Engineers Lock and Dam #2 at Calhoun assisting boat navigation.

=== Adjacent counties ===
- Henderson County (northwest)
- Daviess County (northeast)
- Ohio County (east)
- Muhlenberg County (south)
- Hopkins County (southwest)
- Webster County (west)

== Demographics ==
Historical population
Census	Pop.	Note	%±
1860	6,144		—
1870	7,614		23.9%
1880	9,293		22.1%
1890	9,887		6.4%
1900	12,448		25.9%
1910	13,241		6.4%
1920	12,502		−5.6%
1930	11,072		−11.4%
1940	11,446		3.4%
1950	10,021		−12.4%
1960	9,355		−6.6%
1970	9,062		−3.1%
1980	10,090		11.3%
1990	9,628		−4.6%
2000	9,938		3.2%
2010	9,531		−4.1%
2020	9,152		−4.0%
2025 (est.)	9,064	▼	−1.0%
U.S. Decennial Census; 1790-1960 1900-1990; 1990-2000 2010-2021

=== 2020 census ===
As of the 2020 census, the county had a population of 9,152. The median age was 43.6 years. 22.5% of residents were under the age of 18 and 21.4% of residents were 65 years of age or older. For every 100 females there were 98.2 males, and for every 100 females age 18 and over there were 95.8 males age 18 and over.

The racial makeup of the county was 95.5% White, 0.5% Black or African American, 0.1% American Indian and Alaska Native, 0.1% Asian, 0.0% Native Hawaiian and Pacific Islander, 0.9% from some other race, and 2.9% from two or more races. Hispanic or Latino residents of any race comprised 1.8% of the population.

0.0% of residents lived in urban areas, while 100.0% lived in rural areas.

There were 3,737 households in the county, of which 30.4% had children under the age of 18 living with them and 23.9% had a female householder with no spouse or partner present. About 26.6% of all households were made up of individuals and 13.9% had someone living alone who was 65 years of age or older.

There were 4,161 housing units, of which 10.2% were vacant. Among occupied housing units, 77.9% were owner-occupied and 22.1% were renter-occupied. The homeowner vacancy rate was 0.6% and the rental vacancy rate was 9.5%.

=== 2000 census ===
As of the census of 2000, there were 9,938 people, 3,984 households, and 2,880 families residing in the county. The population density was 39 per square mile (15/km^{2}). There were 4,392 housing units at an average density of 17 per square mile (6.6/km^{2}). The racial makeup of the county was 98.58% White, 0.36% Black or African American, 0.16% Native American, 0.04% Asian, 0.01% Pacific Islander, 0.31% from other races, and 0.53% from two or more races. 0.84% of the population were Hispanic or Latino of any race.

There were 3,984 households, out of which 32.30% had children under the age of 18 living with them, 60.00% were married couples living together, 8.70% had a female householder with no husband present, and 27.70% were non-families. 24.70% of all households were made up of individuals, and 11.40% had someone living alone who was 65 years of age or older. The average household size was 2.47 and the average family size was 2.93.

In the county, the population was spread out, with 24.20% under the age of 18, 8.30% from 18 to 24, 27.70% from 25 to 44, 25.40% from 45 to 64, and 14.50% who were 65 years of age or older. The median age was 38 years. For every 100 females, there were 96.40 males. For every 100 females age 18 and over, there were 93.20 males.

The median income for a household in the county was $29,675, and the median income for a family was $35,322. Males had a median income of $28,446 versus $19,432 for females. The per capita income for the county was $16,046. About 13.70% of families and 16.00% of the population were below the poverty line, including 21.10% of those under age 18 and 18.50% of those age 65 or over.

== Education ==
McLean County has a county-wide public school district of some 1,300 students with one high school, one middle school and three elementary schools.

McLean County High School has approximately 400 students. Its first graduating class was 1973. McLean County Middle School has roughly 350 students. In the 2006–2007 school year, McLean County Middle School ranked third in final year testing and second in public schools to Hancock County. Both schools are located just east of Calhoun on Highway 136 and have the cougar as mascots.

Additionally, the county school system has three grade K-5 elementary schools in the towns of Calhoun, Livermore and Sacramento. Elementary schools in the towns of Beech Grove and Island were closed years ago. The Calhoun and Livermore elementaries have about 250 and 200 students respectively, while Sacramento Elementary has around 100 students. Calhoun Elementary School's mascot is the bulldog, Livermore Elementary School's mascot is the yellow jacket, Sacramento Elementary School's mascot is the blue jay, Island Elementary School's mascot was the eagle, and Beech Grove Elementary School's mascot was the gorilla. Sacramento's future was at stake at one time, but the school was renamed as Marie Gatton Phillips Elementary School and remains active.

At any time, between 350 and 400 county residents are enrolled in higher education of some form.

== Media ==
McLean County is served by a weekly newspaper, the McLean County News.

In terms of radio and television, McLean County is part of the Owensboro, Kentucky radio market and the Evansville, Indiana television market. Spectrum, a unit of Charter Communications, is the county's cable television provider.

== Communities ==
=== Cities ===
- Calhoun (county seat)
- Island
- Livermore (largest community)
- Sacramento

=== Census-designated place ===
- Beech Grove

=== Other unincorporated communities ===
==== North McLean ====
- Buel
- Cleopatra
- Comer
- Congleton
- Elba
- Glenville
- Guffie
- Lemon
- Livia (partially in Daviess County)
- Nuckols
- Poverty
- Quinn Landing
- Rangers Landing
- Tichenor
- Wrightsburg
- Wyman

==== South McLean ====
- Buttonsberry
- Poplar Grove
- Rumsey
- Semiway
- Station
- Underwood

== Politics ==
United States presidential election results for McLean County, Kentucky
Year	Republican		Democratic		Third party(ies)	
Year	No.	%	No.	%	No.	%
1912	822	31.40%	1,304	49.81%	492	18.79%
1916	1,439	46.52%	1,589	51.37%	65	2.10%
1920	2,408	46.12%	2,754	52.75%	59	1.13%
1924	1,857	43.61%	2,284	53.64%	117	2.75%
1928	2,408	58.07%	1,728	41.67%	11	0.27%
1932	1,412	33.43%	2,771	65.60%	41	0.97%
1936	1,338	34.49%	2,496	64.35%	45	1.16%
1940	1,698	38.44%	2,709	61.33%	10	0.23%
1944	1,752	43.83%	2,222	55.59%	23	0.58%
1948	1,112	33.41%	2,104	63.22%	112	3.37%
1952	1,791	47.60%	1,961	52.11%	11	0.29%
1956	1,886	48.73%	1,965	50.78%	19	0.49%
1960	2,269	56.94%	1,716	43.06%	0	0.00%
1964	1,173	31.24%	2,576	68.60%	6	0.16%
1968	1,372	35.73%	1,373	35.76%	1,095	28.52%
1972	2,298	65.10%	1,191	33.74%	41	1.16%
1976	1,212	33.73%	2,346	65.29%	35	0.97%
1980	1,497	40.35%	2,147	57.87%	66	1.78%
1984	1,942	50.03%	1,917	49.38%	23	0.59%
1988	1,829	44.49%	2,269	55.19%	13	0.32%
1992	1,355	32.82%	2,223	53.84%	551	13.34%
1996	1,368	38.05%	1,834	51.02%	393	10.93%
2000	2,219	55.17%	1,747	43.44%	56	1.39%
2004	2,584	58.26%	1,823	41.10%	28	0.63%
2008	2,386	53.96%	1,963	44.39%	73	1.65%
2012	2,705	64.40%	1,432	34.10%	63	1.50%
2016	3,381	74.05%	988	21.64%	197	4.31%
2020	3,633	75.97%	1,074	22.46%	75	1.57%
2024	3,578	77.21%	989	21.34%	67	1.45%

=== Elected officials ===
Elected officials as of January 3, 2025
U.S. House	Brett Guthrie (R)	KY 2
Ky. Senate	Gary Boswell (R)	8
Ky. House	Jim Gooch Jr. (R)	12

== See also ==
- National Register of Historic Places listings in McLean County, Kentucky
