= Buel, Kentucky =

Unincorporated community in Kentucky, United States

- Unincorporated community
- Location within Kentucky Location within the United States
- Coordinates: 37°32′54″N 87°10′27″W
- Country: United States
- State: Kentucky
- County: McLean

Government
- Elevation: 436 ft (133 m)
- Time zone: UTC-6 (Central (CST))
  - Summer (DST): UTC-5 (CDT)
- GNIS feature ID: 507607

Buel is an unincorporated community located in McLean County, Kentucky, United States. It was also known as Pickaway.
