= National Register of Historic Places listings in McLean County, Kentucky =

Location of McLean County in Kentucky

This is a list of the National Register of Historic Places listings in McLean County, Kentucky.

It is intended to be a complete list of the properties on the National Register of Historic Places in McLean County, Kentucky, United States. The locations of National Register properties for which the latitude and longitude coordinates are included below, may be seen in a map.

There are 10 properties listed on the National Register in the county, of which 6 are part of a National Historic Landmark spread across multiple counties.

This National Park Service list is complete through NPS recent listings posted September 19, 2025.

== Current listings ==
	Name on the Register	Image	Date listed	Location	City or town	Description
1	Archaeological Site 15 McL 18	Archaeological Site 15 McL 18	March 15, 1982 (#82002738)	Left bank of the Green River, 1.5 miles (2.4 km) below the mouth of the Rough River; 37°29′08″N 87°09′52″W	Livermore	
2	Archeological Site No. 15McL16	Archeological Site No. 15McL16	April 1, 1986 (#86000648)	Left bank of the Green River immediately above Rumsey; 37°31′48″N 87°15′05″W	Rumsey	Part of the Green River Shell Middens Archeological District National Historic Landmark
3	Archeological Site No. 15McL17		April 1, 1986 (#86000649)	Above the right bank of the Rough River, 1.5 miles (2.4 km) east of Livermore; 37°29′03″N 87°06′21″W	Livermore	Part of the Green River Shell Middens Archeological District National Historic Landmark
4	Austin Site (15McL15)	Austin Site (15McL15)	April 1, 1986 (#86000650)	Left bank of the Green River, 4 miles (6.4 km) below Calhoun; 37°32′36″N 87°18′21″W	Calhoun	Part of the Green River Shell Middens Archeological District National Historic Landmark
5	Battle of Sacramento Battlefield	Battle of Sacramento Battlefield	March 24, 1998 (#97000875)	Junction of Kentucky Routes 81 and 85; 37°25′10″N 87°15′42″W	Sacramento	
6	Butterfield Site (15McL7)	Butterfield Site (15McL7)	April 1, 1986 (#86000651)	Southern bank of the Green River across from the mouth of the Rough River; 37°28′57″N 87°08′03″W	Livermore	Part of the Green River Shell Middens Archeological District National Historic Landmark
7	Crowe Shell Midden (15McL109)	Crowe Shell Midden (15McL109)	April 1, 1986 (#86000652)	Left bank of the Green River, 1 mile (1.6 km) above Livermore; 37°28′26″N 87°07′27″W	Kirtley	Part of the Green River Shell Middens Archeological District National Historic Landmark
8	R.D. Ford Shell Midden (15McL2)		April 1, 1986 (#86000653)	Along the Green River off Kentucky Route 256, west of Calhoun; 37°33′36″N 87°22′00″W	Ashbyburg	Part of the Green River Shell Middens Archeological District National Historic Landmark.
9	Griffith-Franklin House	Griffith-Franklin House	July 7, 1975 (#75002061)	207 W. 2nd St. 37°32′13″N 87°15′38″W	Calhoun	
10	J. W. Quigg Establishment		September 22, 2025 (#100012243)	304 Main St; 37°29′19″N 87°08′10″W	Livermore	

== See also ==
- List of National Historic Landmarks in Kentucky
- National Register of Historic Places listings in Kentucky
