= National Register of Historic Places listings in Butler County, Kentucky =

Location of Butler County in Kentucky

This is a list of the National Register of Historic Places listings in Butler County, Kentucky.

This is intended to be a complete list of the properties and districts on the National Register of Historic Places in Butler County, Kentucky, United States. The locations of National Register properties and districts for which the latitude and longitude coordinates are included below, may be seen in a map.

There are 16 properties and districts listed on the National Register in the county, of which 6 are part of a National Historic Landmark spread across multiple counties. Another property was once listed but has been removed.

This National Park Service list is complete through NPS recent listings posted March 21, 2025.

== Current listings ==
	Name on the Register	Image	Date listed	Location	City or town	Description
1	Annis Mound and Village Site (15BT2; 15BT20; 15BT21)	Annis Mound and Village Site (15BT2; 15BT20; 15BT21)	December 21, 1985 (#85003182)	Western bank of the Green River in Horseshoe Bend, northeast of Logansport; 37°17′25″N 86°45′30″W	Logansport	
2	Baby Track Rock Petroglyphs (15BT40)		September 8, 1989 (#89001175)	Address Restricted	Morgantown	
3	Carlston Annis Shell Mound (15BT5)		April 1, 1986 (#86000632)	Eastern side of the Green River off Kentucky Route 403; 37°17′28″N 86°48′19″W	Schulztown	Part of the Green River Shell Middens Archeological District National Historic Landmark
4	John Carson House	John Carson House	July 26, 1991 (#91000922)	205 S. Main St. 37°13′28″N 86°41′06″W	Morgantown	
5	Carson-Annis Ferry Farm	Carson-Annis Ferry Farm	July 31, 1998 (#98000935)	1086 Annis Ferry Rd. 37°17′39″N 86°45′10″W	Morgantown	Originally listed as "Carson's Landing", but boundaries increased and name changed on April 10, 2007
6	Confederate-Union Veterans' Monument in Morgantown	Confederate-Union Veterans' Monument in Morgantown	July 17, 1997 (#97000713)	1 block north of the junction of U.S. Route 231 and KY 403; 37°13′32″N 86°41′00″W	Morgantown	
7	DeWeese Shell Mound (15BT6)		April 1, 1986 (#86000635)	Eastern bank of the Green River in Horseshoe Bend, west of Taylor Lake; 37°18′26″N 86°49′04″W	Highview	Part of the Green River Shell Middens Archeological District National Historic Landmark
8	Finney Hotel	Finney Hotel	November 7, 1995 (#95001349)	Junction of Kentucky Route 403 and Hime St. 37°11′04″N 86°38′01″W	Woodbury	
9	Ice House on Little Muddy Creek		January 8, 1987 (#87000171)	U.S. Route 231; 37°09′14″N 86°40′33″W	Morgantown	
10	Rayburn Johnson Shell Mound (15BT41)	Rayburn Johnson Shell Mound (15BT41)	April 1, 1986 (#86000633)	Eastern bank of the Green River in Horseshoe Bend, northwest of Taylor Lake; 37°19′28″N 86°49′04″W	Prentiss	Part of the Green River Shell Middens Archeological District National Historic Landmark
11	Read Shell Mound (15BT10)		April 1, 1986 (#86000647)	Northern side of the Green River, west of Morgantown; 37°14′33″N 86°47′27″W	Monticello	Part of the Green River Shell Middens Archeological District National Historic Landmark
12	Reedyville Petroglyphs (15BT65)		September 8, 1989 (#89001176)	Lock 5 Rd., just north of the Green River; 37°10′02″N 86°24′52″W	Reedyville	
13	Russell Shell Mound (15BT11)		April 1, 1986 (#86000637)	Eastern bank of the Green River in Horseshoe Bend; 37°16′16″N 86°48′01″W	Logansport	Part of the Green River Shell Middens Archeological District National Historic Landmark
14	Turkey Rock Petroglyphs (15BT64)		September 8, 1989 (#89001177)	Address Restricted	Morgantown	
15	U.S. Army Corps of Engineers Superintendent's House and Workmen's Office	U.S. Army Corps of Engineers Superintendent's House and Workmen's Office	June 19, 1980 (#80001489)	Woodbury Park; 37°11′05″N 86°37′56″W	Woodbury	
16	Woodbury Shell Midden (15BT67)	Woodbury Shell Midden (15BT67)	April 1, 1986 (#86000639)	Left bank of the Green River immediately above Woodbury; 37°10′51″N 86°37′39″W	Woodbury	Part of the Green River Shell Middens Archeological District National Historic Landmark

== Former listing ==
	Name on the Register	Image	Date listed	Date removed	Location	City or town	Description
1	Butler County Jail		November 1, 1984 (#84000219)	July 5, 1990	S. Warren and E. Logan Sts.	Morgantown	

== See also ==
- List of National Historic Landmarks in Kentucky
