= Carson House =

Carson House may refer to:

in the United States

(by state then city or town)

- Carson Place, Tuscaloosa, Alabama, a historic house listed on the National Register of Historic Places (NRHP) in Tuscaloosa County
- Carson Mansion, Eureka, California, a historic house
- Carson House, Torrington, Connecticut, within NRHP-listed Fyler-Hotchkiss Estate
- Thomas C. Carson House, Iowa City, Iowa, NRHP-listed
- John Carson House, Morgantown, Kentucky, listed on the NRHP in Butler County
- Carson-Annis Ferry Farm, Morgantown, Kentucky, listed on the NRHP in Butler County
- Rachel Carson House (Colesville, Maryland), NRHP-listed
- Kit Carson House, Taos, New Mexico, NRHP-listed
- Carson House (Marion, North Carolina), NRHP-listed
- Carson-Young House, Marion, North Carolina, listed on the NRHP in McDowell County, North Carolina
- Rachel Carson House (Springdale, Pennsylvania), NRHP-listed
- Ira and Wilma Carson House, Ozona, Texas, listed on the NRHP in Crockett County
- Stagecoach Inn (Fairfield, Utah), NRHP-listed, also known as Carson House
- Clerc-Carson House, Ripley, West Virginia, listed on the NRHP in Jackson County
