= Green River Shell Middens Archeological District =

Historic district in Kentucky, United States

- U.S. National Register of Historic Places
- U.S. National Historic Landmark District
- Location: Along the Green River
- NRHP reference No.: 85003182

Significant dates
- Added to NRHP: May 5, 1994
- Designated NHLD: May 5, 1994

The Green River Shell Middens Archeological District is a historic district composed of archaeological sites in the U.S. state of Kentucky. All of the district's sites are shell middens along the banks of the Green River that date from the later portion of the Archaic period. Studies of this assemblage of sites were critical in the development of knowledge of the Archaic period in the eastern United States.

Kentucky's Green River runs through a broad alluvial plain, from which outcroppings of bedrock project. The plain is an area that was inundated during the Pleistocene by a water body dubbed Lake Green, which resulted in the deposition of large amounts of silt. The middens of this district are typically located along the prehistoric routes of waterways that were established after Lake Green was drained. Archaic period Native Americans were drawn to these waterways by an abundance of mussels.

The district was established and named a National Historic Landmark on May 5, 1994. Each of the district's twenty-three contributing properties had previously been listed on the National Register of Historic Places by itself. The sites are distributed among five counties: Butler County (BT), Henderson County (HE), McLean County (McL), Muhlenberg County (MU), and Ohio County (OH).

== Contributing properties ==
The district comprises the following sites, listed by their Smithsonian trinomials; names are provided for named sites.

Number	Name	Location	City	Photo	Comments
15BT5	Carlston Annis	Eastern side of the Green River off Kentucky Route 403; 37°16′28″N 86°48′19″W	Schulztown		
15BT6	DeWeese	Eastern bank of the Green River in Horseshoe Bend, west of Taylor Lake; 37°18′26″N 86°49′4″W	Highview		
15BT10	Read	Northern side of the Green River, west of Morgantown; 37°14′33″N 86°47′27″W	Monticello		
15BT11	Russell	Eastern bank of the Green River in Horseshoe Bend; 37°16′16″N 86°48′1″W	Logansport		
15BT41	Rayburn Johnson	Eastern bank of the Green River in Horseshoe Bend, northwest of Taylor Lake; 37°19′28″N 86°49′4″W	Prentiss		
15BT67	Woodbury	Left bank of the Green River immediately above Woodbury; 37°10′51″N 86°37′39″W	Woodbury		
15HE160	Bluff City	0.5 miles (0.80 km) above Bluff City on a Green River bluff 37°47′58″N 87°22′20″W	Hebbardsville		
15HE580	None	Right bank of the Green River, 1 mile (1.6 km) above Bluff City; 37°48′25″N 87°21′56″W	Hebbardsville		
15HE589	James Giles	Left bank of the Green River, east of Bluff City; 37°48′20″N 87°19′31″W	Rumsey		
15HE635	None	In the lawn of a house on Reed Bluff City Rd., northeast of Bluff City; 37°48′54″N 87°22′12″W	Hebbardsville		
15McL2	R.D. Ford	Along the Green River off Kentucky Route 256, west of Calhoun; 37°33′36″N 87°22′0″W	Ashbyburg		
15McL7	Butterfield	Southern bank of the Green River across from the mouth of the Rough River; 37°28′57″N 87°8′3″W	Livermore		
15McL15	Austin	Left bank of the Green River, 4 miles (6.4 km) below Calhoun; 37°32′36″N 87°18′21″W	Rumsey		
15McL16	None	Left bank of the Green River immediately above Rumsey; 37°31′48″N 87°15′5″W	Rumsey		
15McL17	None	Above the right bank of the Rough River, 1.5 miles (2.4 km) east of Livermore; 37°29′3″N 87°6′21″W	Livermore		
15McL109	Crowe	Left bank of the Green River, 1 mile (1.6 km) above Livermore; 37°28′26″N 87°7′27″W	Kirtley		
15MU12	Baker	Left bank of the Green River, 3 miles (4.8 km) above the Paradise Fossil Plant; 37°14′18″N 86°56′47″W	Skilesville		
15OH1	Chiggerville	Right bank of the Green River, 3 miles (4.8 km) above the Paradise Fossil Plant; 37°14′24″N 86°56′29″W	Knightsburg		
15OH10	Smallhous	Right bank of the Green River at Smallhous; 37°22′49″N 87°5′33″W	Smallhous		
15OH13	Bowles	Northern side of the Green River opposite Rochester; 37°12′51″N 86°53′52″W	Rochester		
15OH19	Jimtown	Jimtown Hill, 2 miles (3.2 km) above Livermore; 37°28′0″N 87°6′32″W	Kirtley		
15OH95	J.T. Barnard	Across the Green River from South Carrollton; 37°20′12″N 87°7′48″W	Central City		
15OH97	None	Foot of Kirtley-River Rd. at the Green River above Livermore; 37°26′12″N 87°6′8″W	Kirtley		

== See also ==
- Indian Knoll, another shell midden in the region not included in the district
- List of National Historic Landmarks in Kentucky
