= Superintendent's Residence =

Superintendent's Residence or variations may refer to:

- Superintendent's Residence (Cottonwood, Arizona), listed on the NRHP in Arizona
- Grand Canyon National Park Superintendent's Residence, listed on the NRHP in Arizona
- Acting Superintendent's Headquarters, Wawona, CA, listed on the NRHP in California
- Superintendent's Residence, Great Sand Dunes National Monument, Mosca, CO, listed on the NRHP in Colorado
- Colorado State Hospital Superintendent's House, Pueblo, CO, listed on the NRHP in Colorado
- Superintendent's House (Mammoth Cave, Kentucky), listed on the NRHP in Kentucky
- U.S. Army Corps of Engineers Superintendent's House and Workmen's Office, Woodbury, KY, listed on the NRHP in Kentucky
- Borden Mines Superintendent's House, Frostburg, MD, listed on the NRHP in Maryland
- Wyeth Brickyard Superintendent's House, Cambridge, MA, listed on the NRHP in Massachusetts
- Superintendent's Cottage (Flint, Michigan), listed on the NRHP in Michigan
- Hanna, M.A., Company Michigan District Superintendent's House, Stambaugh, MI, listed on the NRHP in Michigan
- General Superintendent's House, Coleraine, MN, listed on the NRHP in Minnesota
- Itasca Lumber Company Superintendent's House, Deer River, MN, listed on the NRHP in Minnesota
- National Woodenware Company Superintendent's Residence, Hill City, MN, listed on the NRHP in Minnesota
- Pipestone Indian School Superintendent's House, Pipestone, MN, listed on the NRHP in Minnesota
- Superintendent's Home at Columbia Training School, Columbia, MS, listed on the NRHP in Mississippi
- Old Superintendent's House, Tupelo Fish Hatchery, Tupelo, MS, listed on the NRHP in Mississippi
- Superintendent's House (Philipsburg, Montana), listed on the NRHP in Montana
- Superintendent's House, Atlantic & Pacific Railroad, Albuquerque, NM, listed on the NRHP in New Mexico
- Superintendent's Residence (Santa Fe, New Mexico), listed on the NRHP in New Mexico
- Dutchess Company Superintendent's House, Wappingers Falls, NY, listed on the NRHP in New York
- Lebanon Cemetery Superintendent's House, Lebanon, OH, listed on the NRHP in Ohio
- Oakland Cemetery Chapel and Superintendent's House and Office, Sandusky, OH, listed on the NRHP in Ohio
- Crater Lake Superintendent's Residence, Crater Lake National Park, OR, listed on the NRHP in Oregon
- Superintendent's House (Sumpter, Oregon), listed on the NRHP in Oregon
- Superintendent of Lighthouses' Dwelling, San Juan, PR, listed on the NRHP in Puerto Rico
- Utah Copper Company Mine Superintendent's House, Copperton, UT, listed on the NRHP in Utah
- Superintendent's Residence at the Utah State Hospital, Provo, UT, listed on the NRHP in Utah
- Union Mills Superintendent's House, Olympia, WA, listed on the NRHP in Washington
- Salsich Lumber Company Superintendent's House, Yelm, WA, listed on the NRHP in Washington
- Cooper's Rock State Forest Superintendent's House and Garage, Morgantown, WV, listed on the NRHP in West Virginia
