= Ripley Historic District (Ripley, West Virginia) =

Historic district in West Virginia, United States

- U.S. National Register of Historic Places
- U.S. Historic district
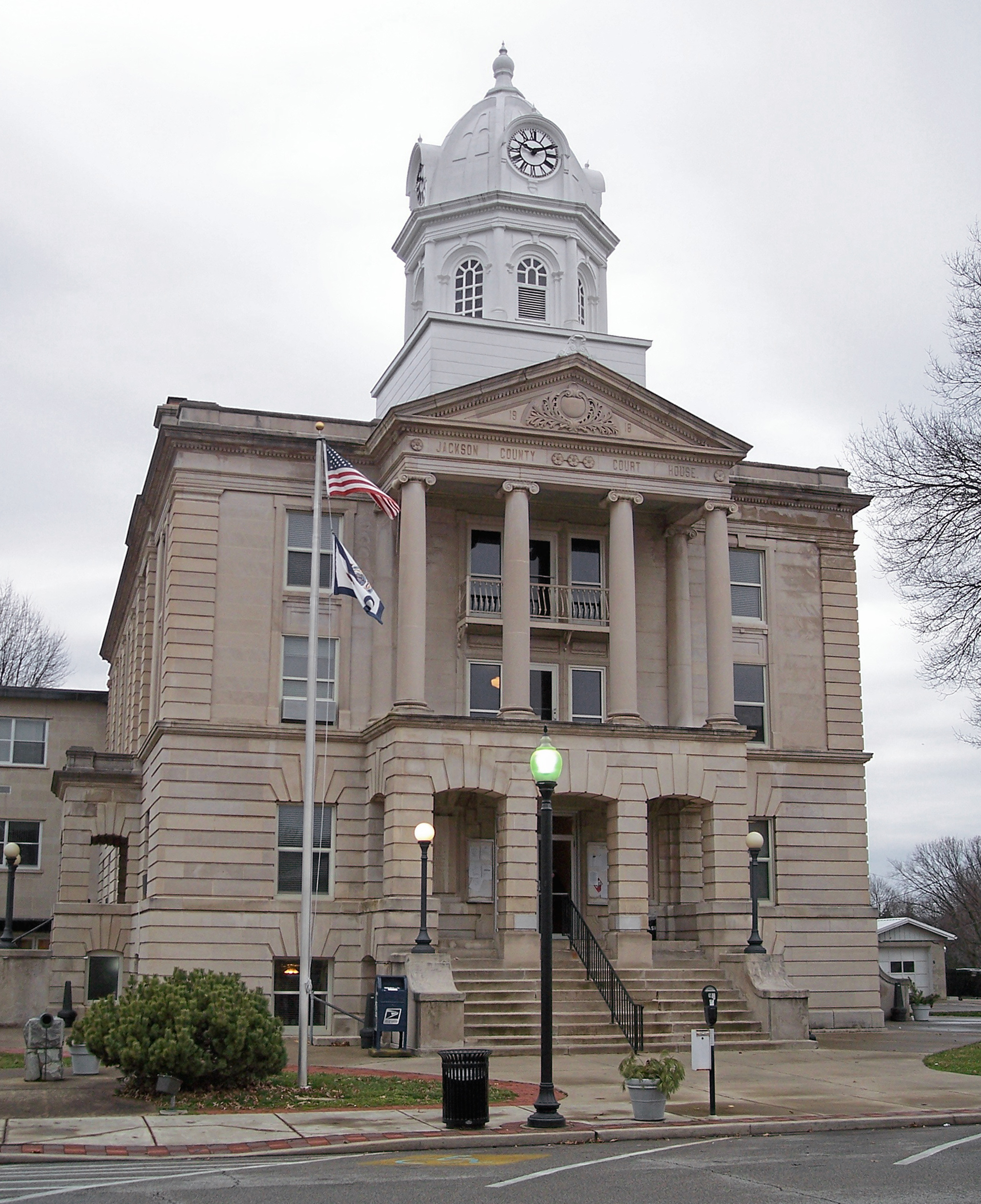
- Jackson County Courthouse, January 2007

- Location within West Virginia Location within the United States
- Location: Portions of Charleston and Highlawn Drs., Church, Court, Main, Maple, North, Seventh, and South Sts., Ripley, West Virginia
- Coordinates: 38°49′10″N 81°42′36″W
- Area: 52 acres (21 ha)
- Architect: Dean, Levi J.; Progler, Charles H.
- Architectural style: Late 19th And 20th Century Revivals, Modern Movement
- NRHP reference No.: 04000919
- Added to NRHP: August 25, 2004

Ripley Historic District is a national historic district located at Ripley, Jackson County, West Virginia. It encompasses 110 contributing buildings, one contributing site (the Early Settlers Cemetery), and one contributing structure that include the commercial and civic core of the town, and surrounding residential buildings. It includes example of popular architectural styles of the late-19th and early- to mid-20th century, including Queen Anne, Colonial Revival, Art Moderne, Neo-Classical Revival, Italianate and Modern. Notable buildings include the U.S. Post Office, Phillips/Pfost House, Alpine Theater, Hockenberry Store building, Jackson County Courthouse (1918-1920), the Beymer House, and the Hinzman House. Located within the district is the separately listed Clerc-Carson House.

It was listed on the National Register of Historic Places in 2004.
