= Baker Site =

- Baker Site (15MU12)
- U.S. National Register of Historic Places
- U.S. National Historic Landmark District – Contributing property
- Location within Kentucky Location within the United States
- Nearest city: Skilesville, Kentucky
- Coordinates: 37°14′18″N 86°56′47″W
- Area: 1.5 acres (0.61 ha)
- Part of: Green River Shell Middens Archeological District (ID85003182)
- MPS: Green River Shell Middens of Kentucky TR
- NRHP reference No.: 86000654

Significant dates
- Added to NRHP: April 1, 1986
- Designated NHLDCP: May 5, 1994

The Baker Site (designated 15 MU 12) is an archaeological site in Muhlenberg County, Kentucky, located north of Andrew's Run and 2 miles (3.2 km) northwest of Rochester along the banks of the Green River. The site is a shell midden site dating from the Middle Archaic period. In addition to middens, the site also includes four human graves and three dog graves. A number of artifacts, including projectile points and scrapers, have been obtained from the site.

The first surveys of the site took place in 1938, when pits were dug at the site to obtain material for chicken feed. The site was named for Harry Baker, who owned the neighboring piece of land. In 1979, a state survey observed that the center of the site had been destroyed, leaving only the periphery — about 25% of the total site — comparatively undisturbed. Nevertheless, the site remains valuable, and its edges are believed to retain substantial amounts of information. Such an assessment depended partly on the surface collection performed by the 1979 survey, which recovered 55 stone tools and 44 artifacts derived from animals.

The site was added to the National Register of Historic Places on April 1, 1986. It is part of the Green River Shell Middens Archeological District, a National Historic Landmark.
