= College Green =

College Green or The College Green may refer to:

- College Green, Adelaide outdoor venue at the University of Adelaide
- College Green, Bristol, England
- College Green (Dartmouth College), New Hampshire, primarily known as "the Green"
- College Green, Dublin, Ireland
- College Green Historic District, Iowa City, Iowa
- College Green, London, England
- College Green of Ohio University
- College Green (York), England
- Dublin College Green UK Parliament constituency, Ireland
