= Griffith-Franklin House =

Historic house in Kentucky, United States

- U.S. National Register of Historic Places
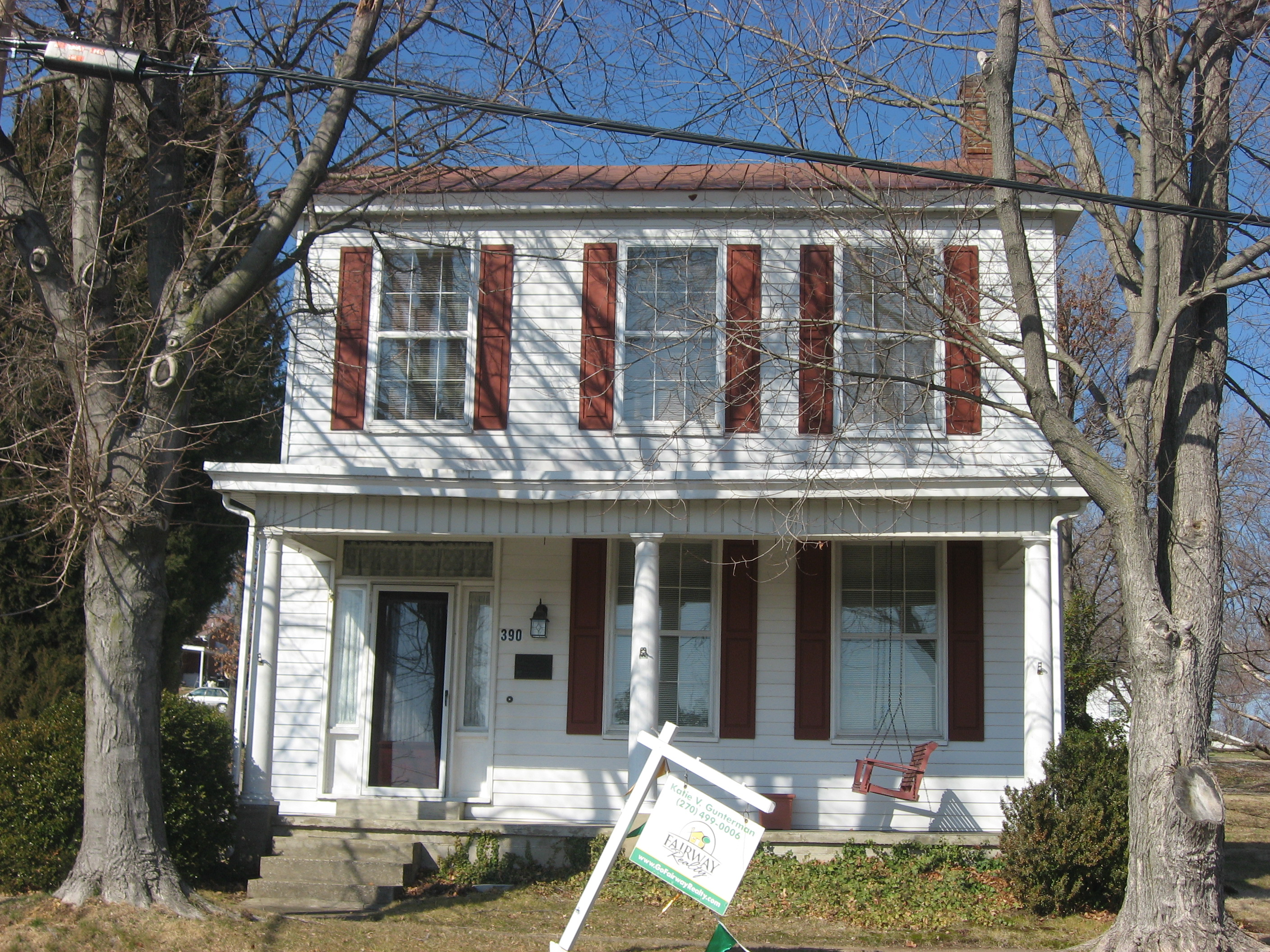

- Location within Kentucky Location within the United States
- Location: 207 W. 2nd St., Calhoun, Kentucky
- Coordinates: 37°32′13″N 87°15′38″W
- Area: 0.5 acres (0.20 ha)
- Built: c.1854
- NRHP reference No.: 75002061
- Added to NRHP: July 7, 1975

The Griffith-Franklin House, at 207 W. 2nd St. in Calhoun, Kentucky, was erected in about 1854. It was listed on the National Register of Historic Places in 1975. It has been known locally as History House and as Crittenden Headquarters.

It served as Union brigadier general Thomas L. Crittenden's headquarters early in the American Civil War. It is located a block from the Green River "at a critical bend", and "sits high with strategic views up and down the valley and across to the town of Rumsey."
