= Superintendent's Residence at the Utah State Hospital =

Historic house in Utah, United States

- U.S. National Register of Historic Places
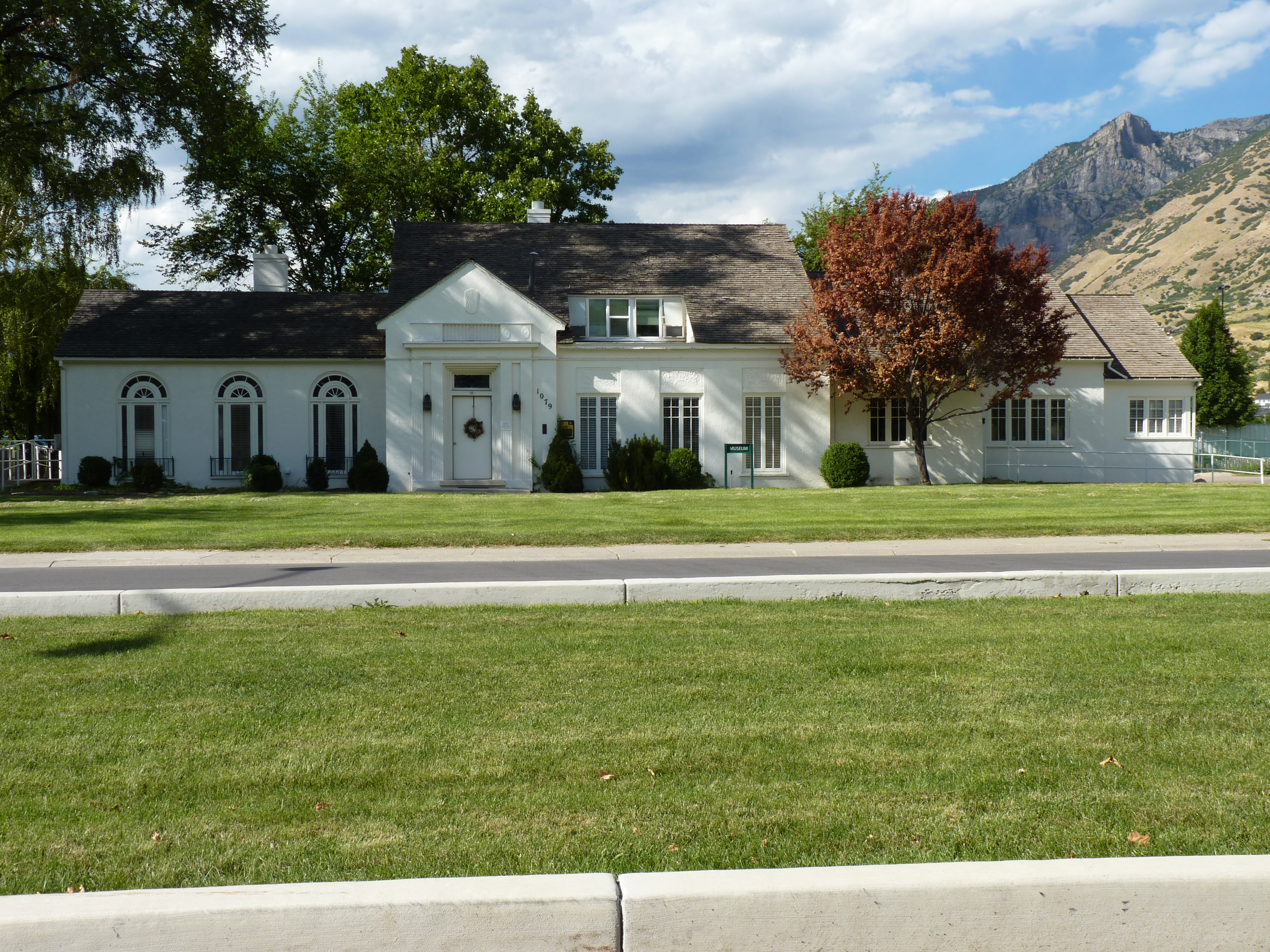
- Looking north at the Superintendent's Residence, August 2011

- Location within Utah Location within the United States
- Location: 1079 East Center Street; Provo, Utah; United States
- Coordinates: 40°14′2″N 111°38′20″W
- Area: 1 acre (0.40 ha)
- Built: 1934
- Built by: PWA
- Architectural style: Colonial Revival
- MPS: Public Works Buildings TR
- NRHP reference No.: 86000748
- Added to NRHP: April 9, 1986

The Superintendent's Residence at the Utah State Hospital is a historic house located at the Utah State Hospital in east Provo, Utah, United States. It was listed on the National Register of Historic Places in 1986.

This Colonial Revival style home was built in 1934. It is one of 232 structures built in Utah during the 1930s under the WPA and various New Deal Programs. The Superintendent's Residence at the Utah State Hospital was designated to the Provo City Historic Landmarks Registry on March 21, 1996.

== Historical significance ==
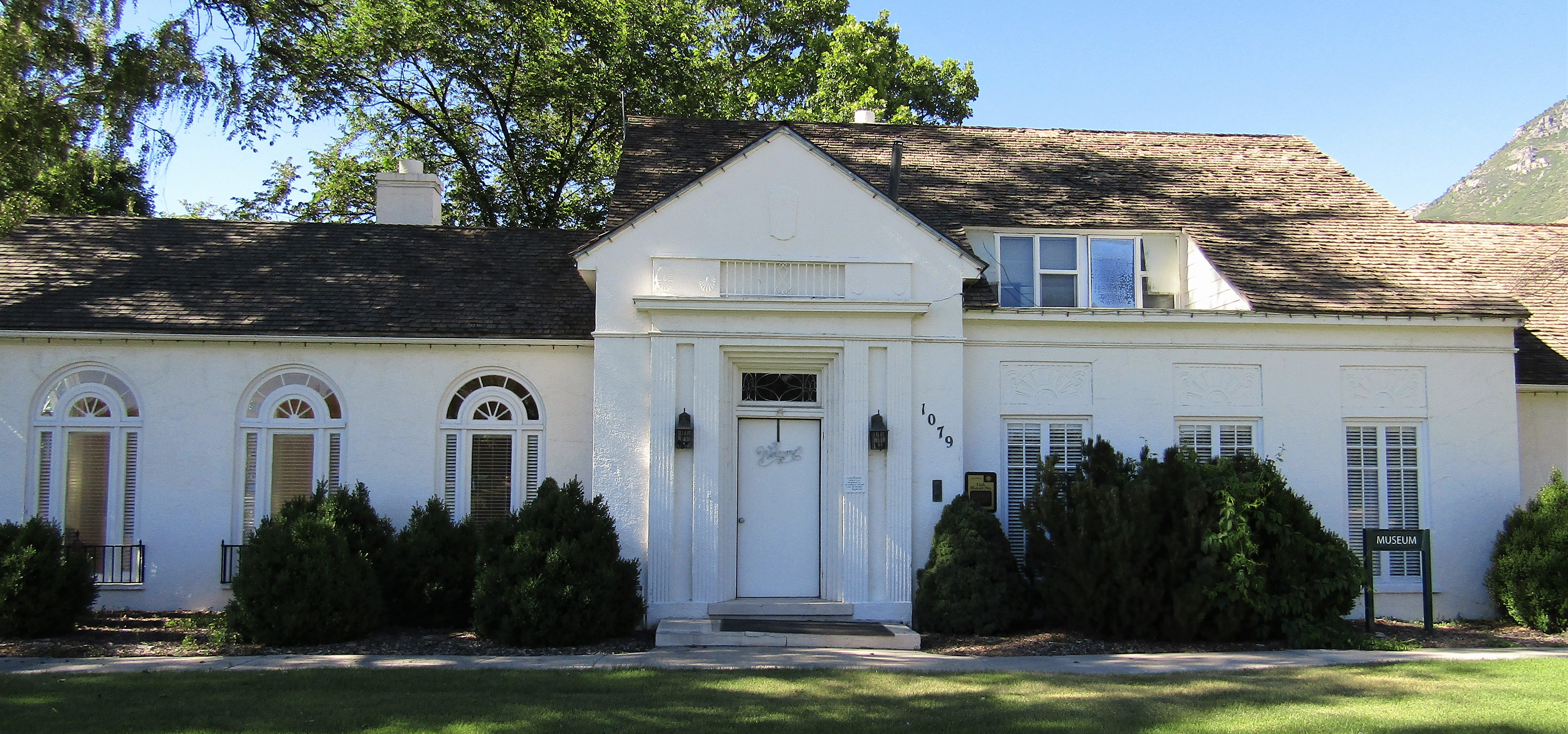
Close up view of the Superintendent's Residence, June 2017

During the time of the Great Depression, the State of Utah was hit hard economically; harder than most of the states. The state had an unemployment rate of 36 percent in 1933, which was the fourth highest in the country. The unemployment rate averaged 25 percent over eight years, between 1932 and 1940. Due to this crisis, and the fact that Utah was worse off than other states, Utah received more federal assistance than many other states. Per capita federal spending in Utah in the 1930s was 9th highest among the 48 states.

Many buildings were built with the funds now provided by the national government, such as fire stations, city halls, national guard armories, public schools and county courthouses. This building, the Superintendent's Residence, is historically significant because it represents and helps document the impact of New Deal programs enforced by the federal government during this time of crisis.

== Structure ==
The Superintendent's Residence was built in 1934 and is a beautiful 1 1/2-story, brick, white house. Inspired by both the Colonial Revival style and the PWA Moderne, this home has a gable roof, a long main section and one-story wings on either side of the main section. Hanging over the entryway is a stylized cornice and frieze, and above these is a balcony. The windows on this home consist of both those of the casement type, which are located on the east side wing, and the windows on the west side wing, which have elliptical fanlight arches. The home is still in good working condition.

== See also ==
- National Register of Historic Places listings in Utah County, Utah
