= Wyeth Brickyard Superintendent's House =

Historic house in Massachusetts, United States

- U.S. National Register of Historic Places
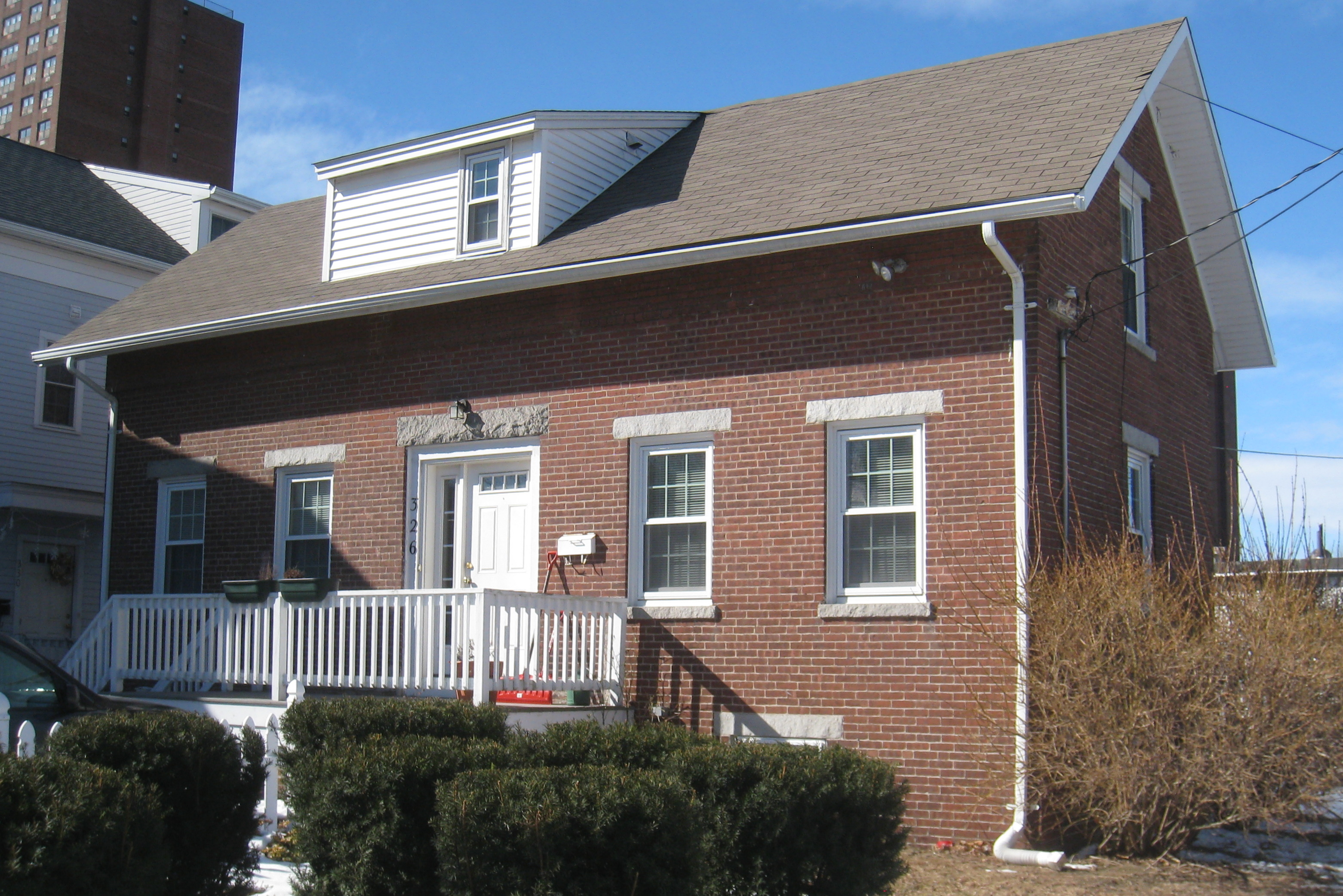

- Location within Massachusetts Location within the United States
- Location: 336 Rindge Avenue, Cambridge, Massachusetts
- Coordinates: 42°23′37.0″N 71°8′14.0″W
- Built: 1848
- Architectural style: Greek Revival, Italianate
- MPS: Cambridge MRA
- NRHP reference No.: 82001987
- Added to NRHP: April 13, 1982

The Wyeth Brickyard Superintendent's House is a historic house in Cambridge, Massachusetts. Built c. 1848, this modest brick 1 1/2-story worker's house is one of the few reminders of the once-thriving 19th century brick industry of North Cambridge. It was built by Nathaniel Wyeth for the superintendent of operations at his brickmaking yard, established in 1840. The house has retained many of its internal and external Greek Revival features.

The house was listed on the National Register of Historic Places in 1982.

== See also ==
- National Register of Historic Places listings in Cambridge, Massachusetts
