= Livermore, Kentucky =

- City
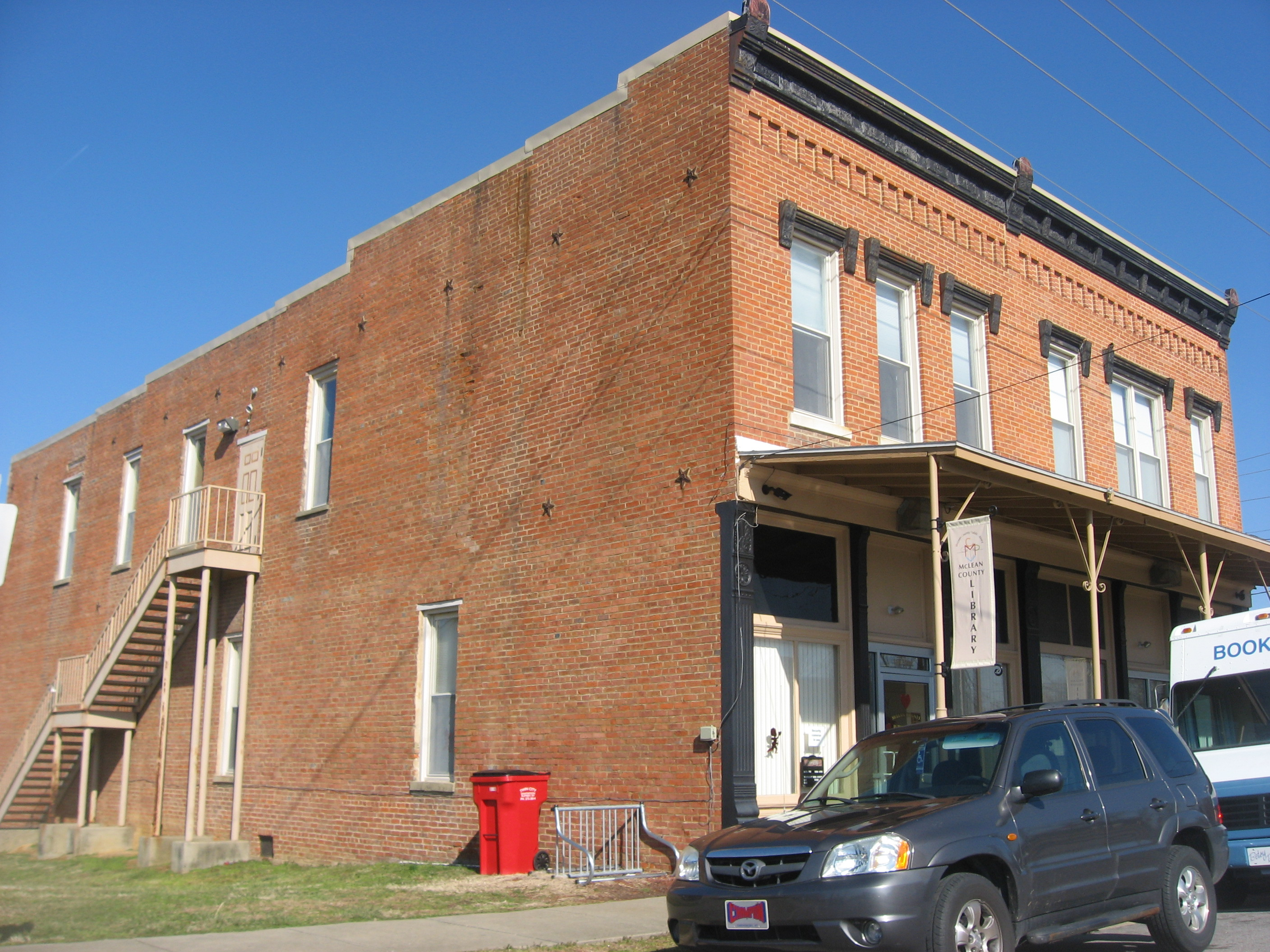
- McLean County Public Library

- Flag Logo

- Location in McLean County, Kentucky
- Coordinates: 37°29′28″N 87°8′7″W
- Country: United States
- State: Kentucky
- County: McLean
- Incorporated: 1850

Government
  - Mayor: Sharon Nell Boyken

Area
  - Total: 1.04 sq mi (2.70 km^{2})
  - Land: 1.03 sq mi (2.68 km^{2})
  - Water: 0.012 sq mi (0.03 km^{2})
- Elevation: 407 ft (124 m)

Population (2020)
  - Total: 1,230
  - Density: 1,190.8/sq mi (459.76/km^{2})
- Time zone: UTC-6 (Central (CST))
  - Summer (DST): UTC-5 (CDT)
- ZIP code: 42352
- Area code: 270
- FIPS code: 21-47062
- GNIS feature ID: 0496908
- Website: www.cityoflivermore.info

Livermore (locally /ˈlɪvərmɔːr/) is a home rule-class city located at the confluence of the Green and Rough rivers in McLean County in the U.S. state of Kentucky. The population was 1,230 as of the 2020 census, down from 1,365 in 2010. It is included in the Owensboro metropolitan area.

== History ==
=== Early years ===
William Brown founded the city in 1837 as "Brown's Landing", but the post office established the next year took the name Livermore. The origin is disputed: some historians trace it to an otherwise-unknown shopkeeper named James Livermore, others to civil engineer Alonzo Livermore who helped construct a dam across the Green River at Rumsey. The city was formally incorporated by the state assembly in 1850.

=== Opera house lynching ===
Livermore achieved national and international notoriety in the second decade of the 20th century for a bizarre lynching. On April 20, 1911, a black man named Will Porter (or Potter) shot and wounded Clarence Mitchell, a white man, after a barroom argument. Sheriff V.P. Stabler then arrested Porter. After this, accounts vary. The New York Times account holds that a local mob of fifty overwhelmed the sheriff, who had hid Porter in the opera house basement to protect him. They then bound Porter's hands and feet, took him to the center stage, and shot him there. Another version reported by several Kentucky papers omitted the sheriff's concern and had Porter taken from the jail to the opera house, where admission was charged to witness the hanging. Those in the gallery were permitted a single shot at Porter; those in the orchestra seats were allowed to empty their guns.

The NAACP quickly condemned the lynching and sent letters to President Taft, the Congress, and Governor Willson of Kentucky. At Willson's insistence, Kentucky issued warrants for 18 of the lynchers; three leaders – including Mitchell's brother Lawrence – were separately indicted and tried for murder, but quickly acquitted. At the time of the indictments, it was locally reported that Clarence Mitchell, "the young white man" whose shooting had enraged the Livermore mob, "has since fully recovered, and has married." Following acquittal of the three ringleaders in fall 1911, indictments of the remaining 15 were "filed away" and appear to have never been brought to trial. In 1915, both presiding Judge T. F. Birkhead and Commonwealth Attorney Ben D. Ringo were defeated for reelection, Birkhead receiving not one vote from McLean County.

== Geography ==
Livermore is located in eastern McLean County at 37°29′28″N 87°8′7″W (37.490987, -87.135340), on the north side of the Green River and Rough River. It is bordered to the south, across the Rough River, by Ohio County.

U.S. Route 431 passes through the east side of Livermore as Henton Street. The highway leads north 20 miles (32 km) to Owensboro and south 15 miles (24 km) to Central City. Kentucky Route 136 passes through the northern part of the city, leading west 9 miles (14 km) to Calhoun, the McLean county seat, and east 14 miles (23 km) to Hartford.

According to the United States Census Bureau, Livermore has a total area of 1.04 square miles (2.7 km^{2}), of which 0.007 square miles (0.018 km^{2}), or 0.67%, are water.

== Demographics ==
Historical population
Census	Pop.	Note	%±
1870	302		—
1880	399		32.1%
1890	622		55.9%
1900	869		39.7%
1910	1,220		40.4%
1920	1,426		16.9%
1930	1,573		10.3%
1940	1,601		1.8%
1950	1,441		−10.0%
1960	1,506		4.5%
1970	1,594		5.8%
1980	1,672		4.9%
1990	1,534		−8.3%
2000	1,482		−3.4%
2010	1,365		−7.9%
2020	1,230		−9.9%
U.S. Decennial Census

As of the census of 2000, there were 1,482 people, 614 households, and 405 families residing in the city. The population density was 1,438.1 inhabitants per square mile (555.3/km^{2}). There were 667 housing units at an average density of 647.3 per square mile (249.9/km^{2}). The racial makeup of the city was 97.98% White, 0.07% African American, 0.13% Native American, 0.07% Asian, 0.81% from other races, and 0.94% from two or more races. Hispanic or Latino of any race were 1.75% of the population.

There were 614 households, out of which 33.7% had children under the age of 18 living with them, 46.7% were married couples living together, 15.0% had a female householder with no husband present, and 33.9% were non-families. 30.3% of all households were made up of individuals, and 15.5% had someone living alone who was 65 years of age or older. The average household size was 2.41 and the average family size was 3.01.

In the city, the population was spread out, with 27.1% under the age of 18, 9.7% from 18 to 24, 25.0% from 25 to 44, 23.7% from 45 to 64, and 14.6% who were 65 years of age or older. The median age was 37 years. For every 100 females, there were 88.3 males. For every 100 females age 18 and over, there were 82.0 males.

The median income for a household in the city was $23,086, and the median income for a family was $27,404. Males had a median income of $25,083 versus $19,583 for females. The per capita income for the city was $15,049. About 18.0% of families and 18.1% of the population were below the poverty line, including 19.0% of those under age 18 and 16.2% of those age 65 or over.

== Education ==
Livermore has a lending library, the McLean County Public Library.
