= Finney Hotel =

- U.S. National Register of Historic Places
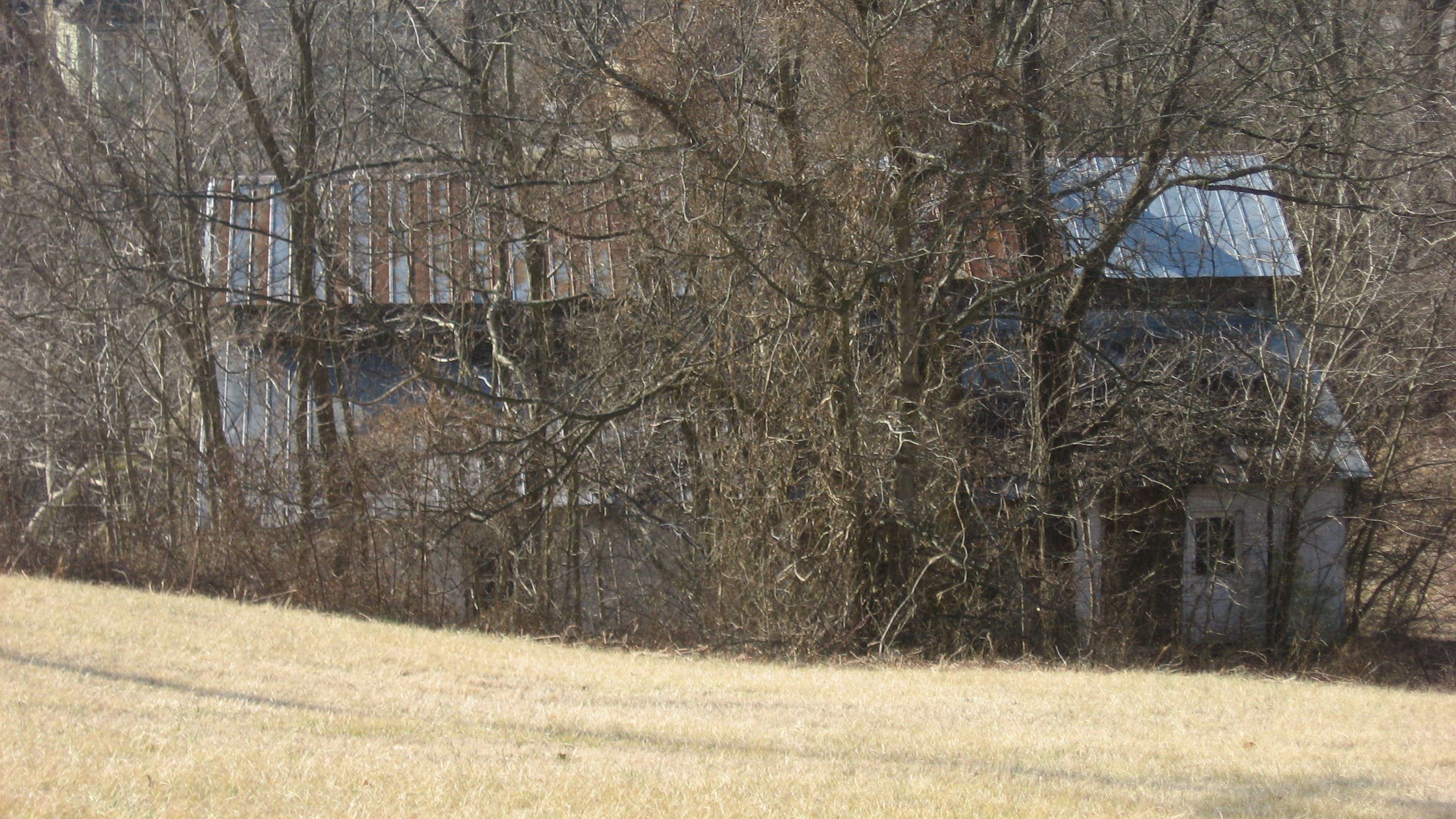
- Location: Junction of KY 403 and Hime St., Woodbury, Kentucky
- Coordinates: 37°11′04″N 86°38′01″W
- Area: less than one acre
- Built: 1890
- Built by: Jones, J. R.
- Architectural style: I-house
- NRHP reference No.: 95001349
- Added to NRHP: November 7, 1995

The Finney Hotel, in Woodbury, Kentucky, is a historic I-house building built in 1890. It was listed on the National Register of Historic Places (NRHP) in 1995.

It is located near the Green River in Woodbury Park, an 8.5 acres (3.4 ha) Butler County park, which is also home to two buildings that are NRHP-listed as U.S. Army Corps of Engineers Superintendent's House and Workmen's Office.

It is a two-story wood-frame building. It has also been known as McKinney Hotel. It was deemed "important from c. 1890-1931 because it illustrates the economic development of Woodbury as a turn-of-the-century river town. The hotel is the only nineteenth century commercial building remaining in Woodbury."
