= Carson Place =

Historic house in Alabama, United States

- U.S. National Register of Historic Places
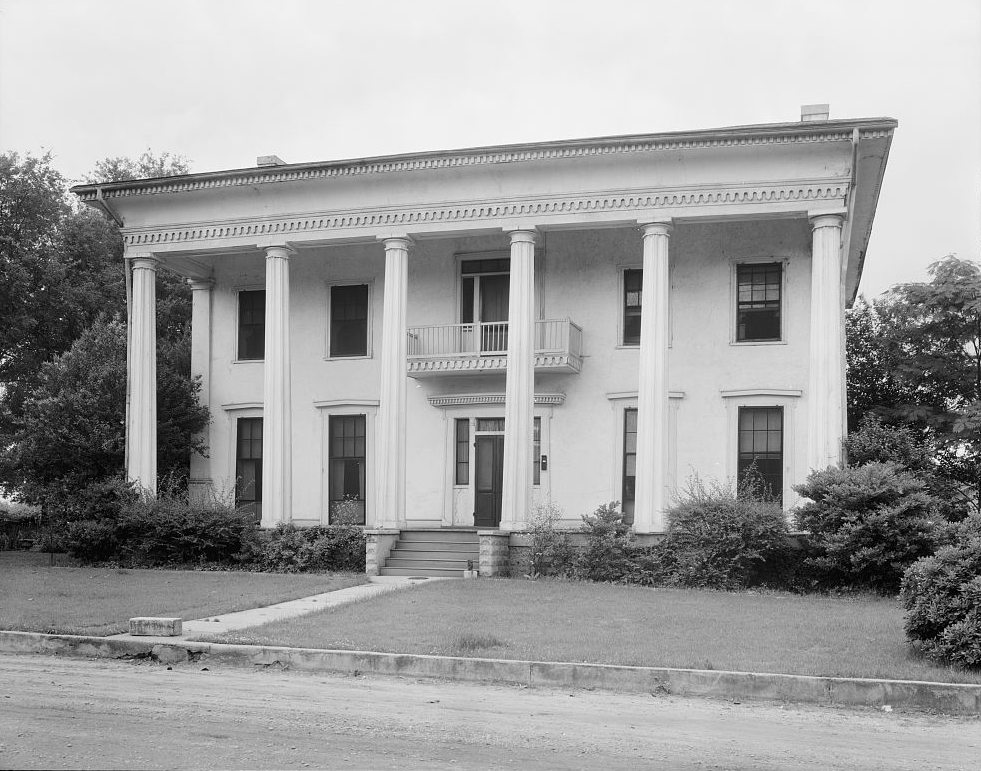
- Carson Place in 1939

- Location within Alabama Location within the United States
- Location: 610 - 36th Avenue, Tuscaloosa, Alabama
- Coordinates: 33°12′19″N 87°35′0″W
- Area: 0.3 acres (0.12 ha)
- Built: 1850
- Architectural style: Dogtrot
- NRHP reference No.: 85000448
- Added to NRHP: March 7, 1985

Carson Place, also known as the Cox-Mayfield-Sutley House, is a historic mansion in Tuscaloosa, Alabama, U.S.

== History ==
The house was first built in 1822–1825 for George Cox. Its construction was extended by John J. Webster in 1827 for his widow, Mary Cox. She extended it again in 1835 and lived in the house with her second husband and her son until 1869. It was subsequently inherited by her daughter-in-law, Sarah Cox, and it became known as The Old Carson Place. From 1923 to 1962, it belonged to Judge J. J. Mayfield. By the 1970s, it belonged to Lawrence P. Sutley.

== Architectural significance ==
The house has been listed on the National Register of Historic Places since March 7, 1985.
