= Thomas C. Carson House =

Historic house in Iowa, United States

- U.S. National Register of Historic Places
- U.S. Historic district – Contributing property
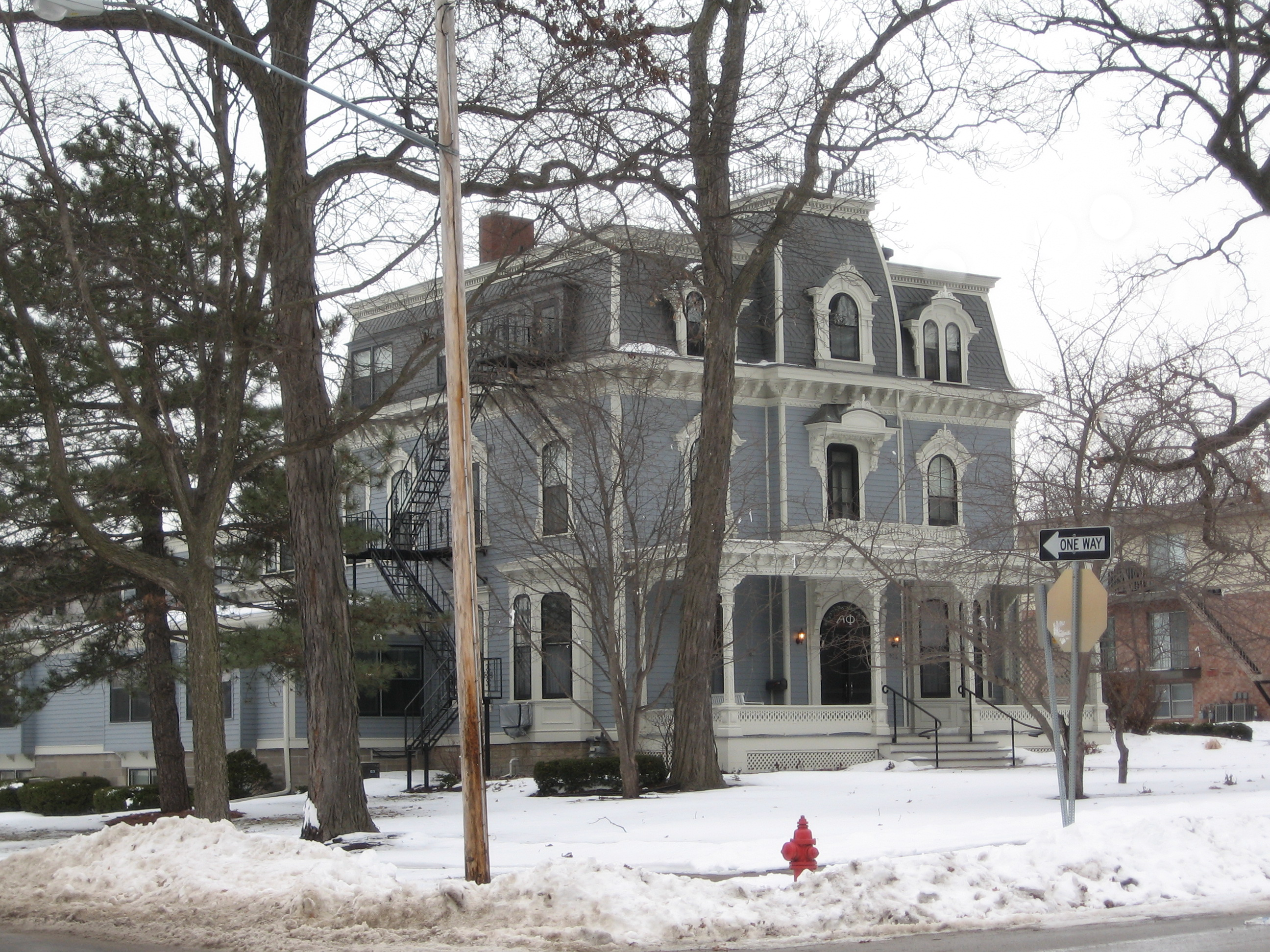
- Carson House

- Location within Iowa Location within the United States
- Location: 906 E. College St., Iowa City, Iowa
- Coordinates: 41°39′33.5″N 91°31′21″W
- Area: less than one acre
- Built: 1875
- Architectural style: Second Empire
- Part of: College Green Historic District (ID97000623)
- NRHP reference No.: 82002623
- Added to NRHP: September 9, 1982

The Thomas C. Carson House is a historic building located in Iowa City, Iowa, United States. It is currently in use as the sorority house of the University of Iowa chapter of Alpha Phi, and is thus also known as the Carson-Alpha Phi House.

Carson was one of the passengers on the first train to enter Iowa City. He went to become a prominent merchant and banker in the community, and was involved with the local utility companies that his sons controlled. He had this house built in 1875 in Second Empire style. The three-story frame house features a mansard roof with a concave slope, and elaborate dormers. It was individually listed on the National Register of Historic Places in 1982. In 1997 it was included as a contributing property in the College Green Historic District.
