= College Green Historic District =

Historic district in Iowa, United States

- U.S. National Register of Historic Places
- U.S. Historic district
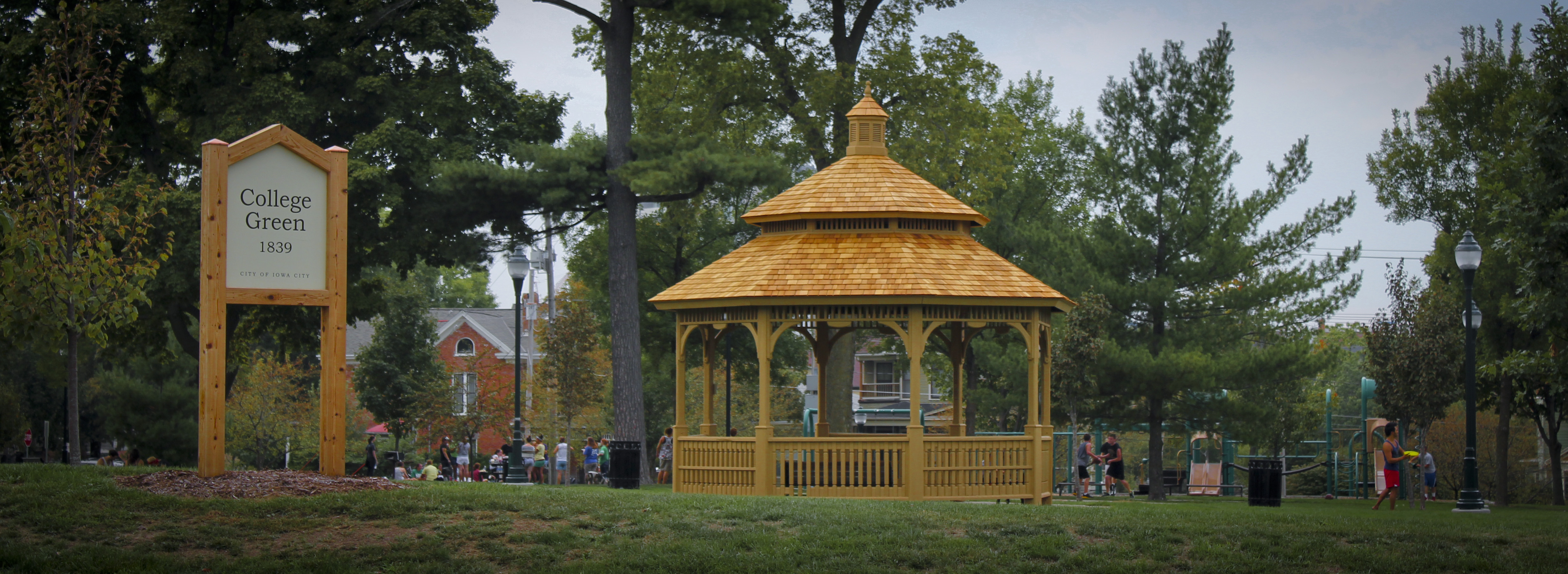
- College Green Park

- Location within Iowa Location within the United States
- Location: Roughly bounded by Burlington, Summit, Washington, and Van Buren Sts., Iowa City, Iowa
- Coordinates: 41°39′32″N 91°31′32″W
- Area: 17.5 acres (7.1 ha)
- Architectural style: Late Victorian; Late 19th and 20th Century Revivals; Late 19th and Early 20th Century American Movements
- MPS: Iowa City MPS
- NRHP reference No.: 97000623
- Added to NRHP: July 9, 1997

The College Green Historic District is a nationally recognized historic district located in Iowa City, Iowa, United States. It was listed on the National Register of Historic Places in 1997. At the time of its nomination it consisted of 47 resources, which included 37 contributing buildings, one contributing site, and nine non-contributing buildings. This neighborhood in the central part of the city surrounds a square-block park called College Green, from which it derives its name. The park, which is the contributing site, is found on the earliest maps of Iowa City. While the earliest houses in the district were built in the 1860s, most were constructed between 1890 and 1920. No one architectural style dominates here, but the district contains a variety of styles that were popular in the late 19th and early 20th centuries. This is one of three areas in the city where the fraternities and sororities associated with the University of Iowa are located. The Thomas C. Carson House (1875), which now houses a sorority, is individually listed on the National Register of Historic Places.
