= Ashbyburg, Kentucky =

Unincorporated community in Kentucky, United States

- Unincorporated community
- Location within Kentucky Location within the United States
- Coordinates: 37°32′07″N 87°22′08″W
- Country: United States
- State: Kentucky
- County: Hopkins
- Elevation: 446 ft (136 m)
- Time zone: UTC-6 (Central (CST))
  - Summer (DST): UTC-5 (CDT)
- Area code: 270
- GNIS feature ID: 486078

Ashbyburg is an unincorporated community in Hopkins County, Kentucky, United States. Ashbyburg is located near the Green River and Kentucky Route 370 in northeastern Hopkins County, 6.1 miles (9.8 km) west of Calhoun.

== History ==
Ashbyburg was incorporated in 1829. It was named for General Stephen Ashby.
