= Ice House on Little Muddy Creek =

- U.S. National Register of Historic Places
- Nearest city: Morgantown, Kentucky
- Built: 1850
- Architectural style: Greek Revival, Other, Gothic Revival
- MPS: Early Stone Buildings of Kentucky Outer Bluegrass and Pennyrile TR
- NRHP reference No.: 87000171
- Added to NRHP: January 8, 1987

The Ice House on Little Muddy Creek is the ruins of an old stone structure meant to hold ice near Morgantown, Kentucky, placed on the National Register of Historic Places on January 8, 1987, as part of the Early Stone Buildings of Kentucky Multiple Property Submission.

The Ice House is notable for having "exceptionally fine masonry". Its face has finished square stones and toothed chiseled random pattern strikings; this tooling pattern is the only such pattern in the Commonwealth of Kentucky. This oddity is why it was placed on the National Register, whereas most ruins are unable to achieve National Register status due to no longer retaining integrity of the structure. Most ice houses are built into the earth, but this ice house was above ground, and used cavities filled with sawdust to insulate the ice.
