= Carlston Annis Shell Mound =

- Carlston Annis Shell Mound (15BT5)
- U.S. National Register of Historic Places
- U.S. National Historic Landmark District – Contributing property
- Location within Kentucky Location within the United States
- Location: Eastern side of the Green River off Kentucky Route 403
- Nearest city: Schulztown, Kentucky
- Coordinates: 37°17′28″N 86°48′19″W
- Area: 2.4 acres (0.97 ha)
- Part of: Green River Shell Middens Archeological District (ID85003182)
- MPS: Green River Shell Middens of Kentucky TR
- NRHP reference No.: 86000632

Significant dates
- Added to NRHP: April 1, 1986
- Designated NHLDCP: May 5, 1994

The Carlston Annis Shell Mound (designated 15 BT 5) is a prominent archaeological site in the western part of the U.S. state of Kentucky. Located along the Green River in Butler County, this shell midden has been declared a historic site because of its archaeological value.

== Geography ==
The Carlson Annis Shell Mound sits on the eastern side of the Green River, somewhat more than 300 feet (91 m) east of the shoreline. Because it lies in the river's floodplain, the mound is the highest point in the area; its top is typically dry even though the surrounding terrain be flooded. It occupies a dark loamy soil, although the edges of the mound are covered by a substantially lighter loam with mixtures of sand and clay. Since the mound was formed, the river has changed its course; it appears to have flowed directly by the base of the mound as it was being created. When the area was first settled in the early nineteenth century, the floodplain was recognized as valuable farmland, and because the mound is an island during floods, settlers saw it as a place of refuge; for most of the time since whites arrived, farmsteads have occupied its summit.

Measuring approximately 350 feet (110 m) from north to south and 300 feet (91 m) east to west, the mound rises approximately 6 feet (1.8 m) above the surrounding terrain. The shells extend down from the surface by 7.5 feet (2.3 m) from the center; the difference between the heights is the result of floods since the midden was created, which have deposited multiple layers of earth around the base.

== Excavation ==
In 1939, archaeologists from the University of Kentucky began to excavate the Annis Mound under the leadership of W.D. Funkhouser and W.S. Webb. Initial surveys found minimal damage to the site: a well had been dug into the center, and the surface was slightly affected by the foundations of buildings on the top, and neighbors from miles around were frequently digging from the edge to procure shells for use as chicken feed. Excavations began with the digging of a trench through the southern portion of the mound, after which the mound was divided into blocks of 30 by 40 feet (9.1 m × 12.2 m) so that the locations of artifacts could more accurately be plotted on diagrams. The initial excavation produced evidence of 129 different features:

- Hearths — 71
- Fire basins — 21
- Burned clay patches — 4
- Pits — 12
- Caches of stone tools — 10
- Caches of lithic flakes — 8
- Caches of other objects — 3

This concentration of features was comparable to what had previously been found at other Archaic period shell middens in the region, demonstrating the similarity of the builders to other regional peoples: they lived in the vicinity, ate substantial numbers of shellfish, used the site as a trash heap for the shells, and buried their dead in the midden. Beside 390 human bodies, the site produced the skeletons of 28 dogs that showed evidence of having been buried. Many of the bones at the site were substantially decomposed, so the painstaking osteological research undertaken at the comparable Indian Knoll site (15 OH 2) could not be repeated at Carlson Annis. Nevertheless, some information could be determined from certain bodies: ages ranged from infancy well into adulthood, more than half of the bodies (215) were accompanied by artifacts — of which 73% were matters of personal clothing, such as shell gorgets, beads, or hairpins — and some of the bodies were clearly those of victims of violence, such as a group of four that were buried together with projectile points embedded in some of the bones. While earlier publications' analyses were based largely on the presence of these embedded projectile points, more recent scholars have found evidence that bodies were injured in other fashions, such as by clubbing, and injuries that produce no effect upon the skeleton may also have been responsible for some of the deaths. Studies of other sites in the region suggest that some resources were plentiful enough to permit populations to double approximately every thirty years; this likely would have produced competition for other resources, leading to warfare. Overall life expectancy at birth was somewhat more than twenty years; 29.7% of the skeletons were of children under five years of age, of which nearly three-quarters were infants, although examination of these skeletons produced no evidence of violence.

Beside bodies and objects associated with them, the excavation found a total of 19,733 artifacts, which were made from the following materials:

- Flint — 4,228
- Ground stone — 977
- Copper — 2
- Bone — 3,523
- Antler — 1,324
- Shell — 9,679

Additionally, the top of the mound produced 65 sherds of prehistoric pottery. As the Archaic peoples who inhabited the site have shown no evidence of producing their own pottery, these sherds are believed to have been the work of later peoples. Strengthening this proposal was the presence of Euro-American pottery in addition to the 65 sherds — Euro-Americans are known to have used the site because of its high location above floodwaters, and it is believed that later prehistoric peoples likewise camped at the site and would have left behind occasional broken pieces of pottery. Of the 4,000+ flint pieces found at the site, nearly half (1,997) were projectile points of various sorts, with corner-notched and long-shallow-notched shapes being the most common. Other types of flint stone tools included approximately 500 knives, 23 lithic cores, more than 500 drills, and approximately 1,000 scrapers. Artifacts of ground stone included almost fifty axes, seventy atlatl weights, more than one hundred mauls, more than one hundred sandstone discs, more than two hundred hammerstones, and nearly three hundred pestles. The two copper pieces were one bead and one awl, while the bone artifacts comprised over 1,000 awls, 900 fishhooks, occasional projectile points and flakers, and even occasional human bones that had been converted into tools. Most of the antler pieces were projectile points or pieces of unknown purpose, while nearly all of the shells were discs that were being used as beads. Aside from the numerous bits of pottery produced by whites, most of the potsherds found at Annis were grit- or shell-tempered pieces.

Although Carlston Annis and many other Green River shell middens were test excavated in the 1920s, much more extensive work was performed in the 1930s. Between 1937 and 1941, extensive information was revealed by excavations conducted by Works Progress Administration workers between 1937 and 1941.

== Conclusions ==
Radiocarbon dating has suggested that some artifacts at Carlston Annis date back to 5424 BC, although most artifacts dated between 3200 and 1400 BC. Most of its projectile points clearly dated from the Archaic period, although one Adena and occasional Mississippian points were found; they seemingly were left by later peoples, just like the pottery pieces. Two projectile points that were found underneath the mound were fluted points from the Paleoindian period; they are believed to have been sitting on the riverside before the shell mound was started. Like several other shell mound sites in Kentucky, Carlston Annis produced pieces of three stone pipes and of a single stone cup; these objects may have been religious artifacts used by shamans in attempts to heal diseases. Kentucky's larger riverine Archaic sites vary widely in the amount of shell refuse that they have yielded; the much larger amount of shell refuse at sites such as Carlston-Annis and Indian Knoll is seemingly due to the presence of nearby bivalve beds. The numbers and types of non-human bones at the mound were typical of Archaic shell middens in the region, as was the number of antler pieces, although tools made of human bone were unusually numerous. At least three different processes were used to produce fishhooks from bones: some had been made from deer toes; some from bird bones of all sizes, a technique common at Kentucky shell middens; and a few by drilling large bones. Carlston Annis was the first Kentucky shell midden at which fishhooks made by this technique were found, although evidence of this technique is plentiful at the later Fort Ancient-period Madisonville site near Cincinnati. Numerous animal bones appear to have been used as ceremonial "medicine bags," which in later centuries were often made by skinning an animal without removing some of the bones.

The diets of Archaic peoples at many Green River sites has been determined largely from incomplete excavation data at better-known sites, such as Carlston Annis. It appears that the inhabitants' floral diets rested almost completely on nuts, with hickory nuts dominating; both Carlston-Annis and the Bowles Site in Ohio County produced evidence suggesting that 80% of identifiable floral remains were hickory nuts, and 85% of the remnant was acorns. Some evidence exists at these sites for plants such as squash, little barley, and wild rice. Analysis of the burials at Carlston-Annis and other Green River sites demonstrates that the inhabitants' demographics were similar to those of comparable sites elsewhere and to those of modern hunter-gatherer societies. Besides methods of producing fishhooks, Archaic technology can be seen from Carlston Annis in the atlatl components. No direct evidence of specific techniques was apparent from this excavation, but substantial circumstantial evidence was present. Because very few burials were accompanied by stone atlatls, it is believed that many individuals were also buried with wooden atlatls (comparable to modern Eskimo technology) that have not survived to the present. Comparison with Indian Knoll suggests that early inhabitants at Annis used all-wooden atlatls more commonly than the Indian Knoll people.

== Preservation ==
In April 1986, the Carlston Annis Shell Mound was listed on the National Register of Historic Places because of its archaeological importance. It was one of twenty-four shell middens along the Green River known together as the "Green River Shell Middens of Kentucky" that were listed on the National Register together. Eight years later, some of the Green River middens were named a historic district, the Green River Shell Middens Archeological District, and designated a National Historic Landmark.

== See also ==
- Annis Mound and Village Site
