= Clerc-Carson House =

Historic house in West Virginia, United States

- U.S. National Register of Historic Places
- U.S. Historic district – Contributing property
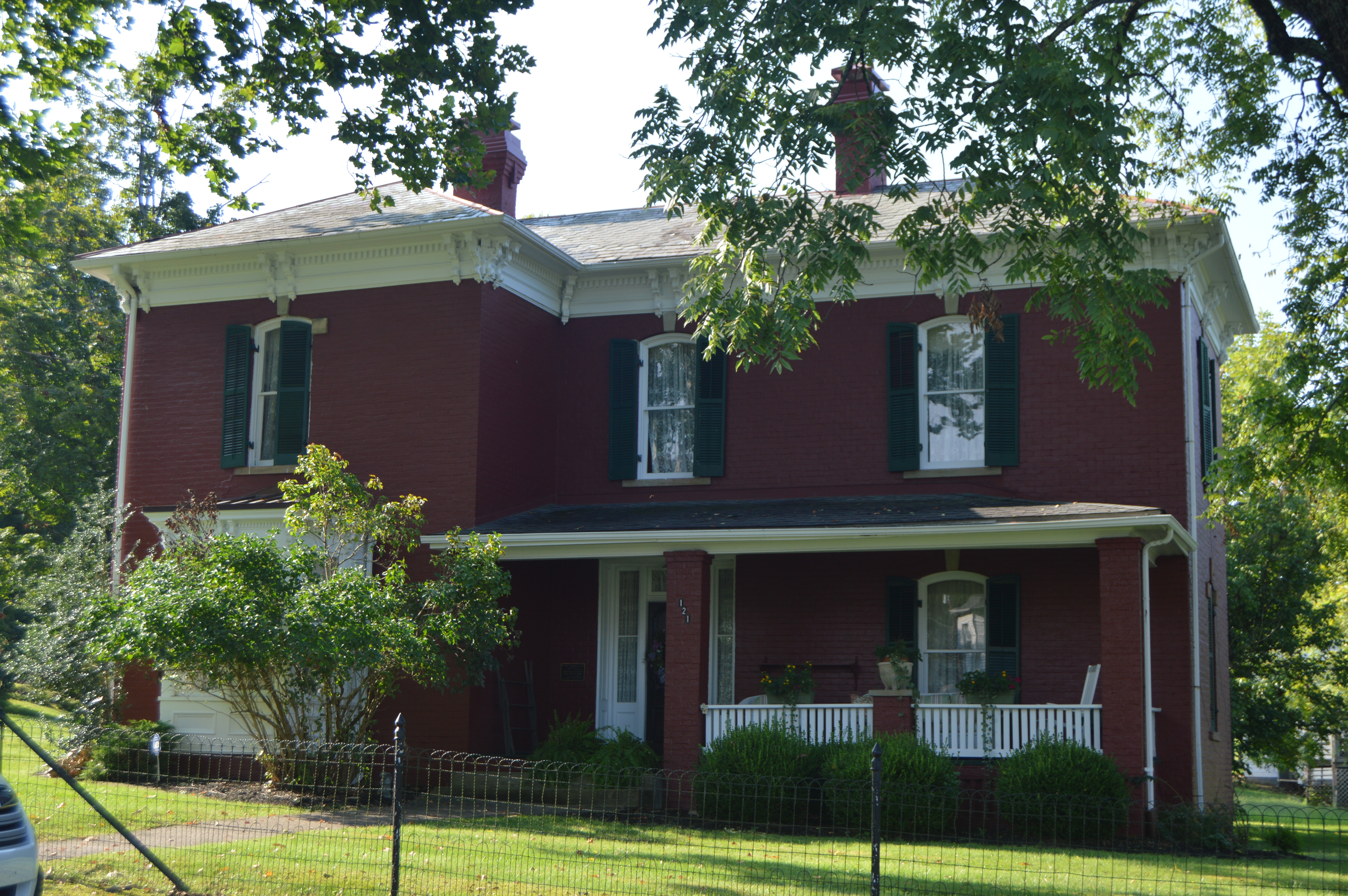
- Front of the house

- Location within West Virginia Location within the United States
- Location: 121 North St., Ripley, West Virginia
- Coordinates: 38°49′10″N 81°42′31″W
- Area: 1 acre (0.40 ha)
- Built: c. 1880
- Architectural style: Italianate
- NRHP reference No.: 92001482
- Added to NRHP: October 29, 1992

Clerc-Carson House is a historic home located at Ripley, Jackson County, West Virginia. It was built about 1880, and is a two-story, asymmetrical, brick dwelling with a T-shaped plan in the Italianate style. It features a low hipped roof with wide eaves, eaves brackets and cornice dentils, and the original shutters in working order.

It was listed on the National Register of Historic Places in 1992. It is located in the Ripley Historic District, listed in 2004.
