= Carson-Annis Ferry Farm =

- Carson's Landing; Carson-Annis Ferry Farm
- U.S. National Register of Historic Places
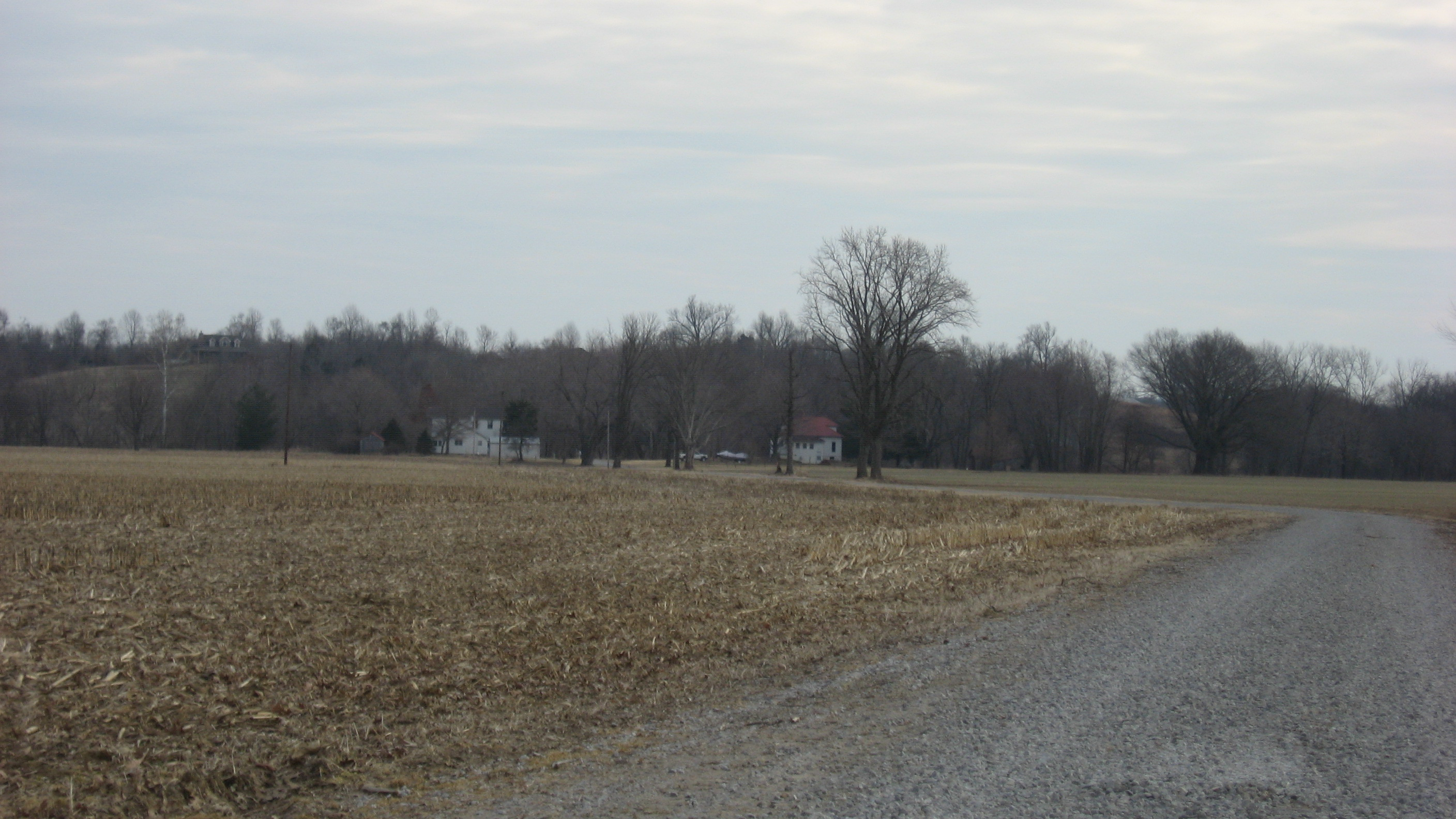

- Location within Kentucky Location within the United States
- Nearest city: Morgantown, Kentucky
- Coordinates: 37°17′39″N 86°45′10″W
- Area: 300 acres (120 ha)
- Built: 1853, 1904
- Architectural style: Greek Revival, Bungalow/craftsman
- NRHP reference No.: 98000935 (original); 07000286 (increase)

Significant dates
- Added to NRHP: July 31, 1998
- Boundary increase: April 10, 2007

The Carson-Annis Ferry Farm, near Morgantown, Kentucky, United States, is a historic area which is listed on the National Register of Historic Places. It was originally listed as Carson's Landing in 1998 but the listing's boundaries were increased and the listing name was changed in 2007.

The 2007 listing includes three contributing buildings, eight contributing structures, and three contributing sites on 298.8 acres (120.9 ha).
