= U.S. Army Corps of Engineers Superintendent's House and Workmen's Office =

- U.S. National Register of Historic Places
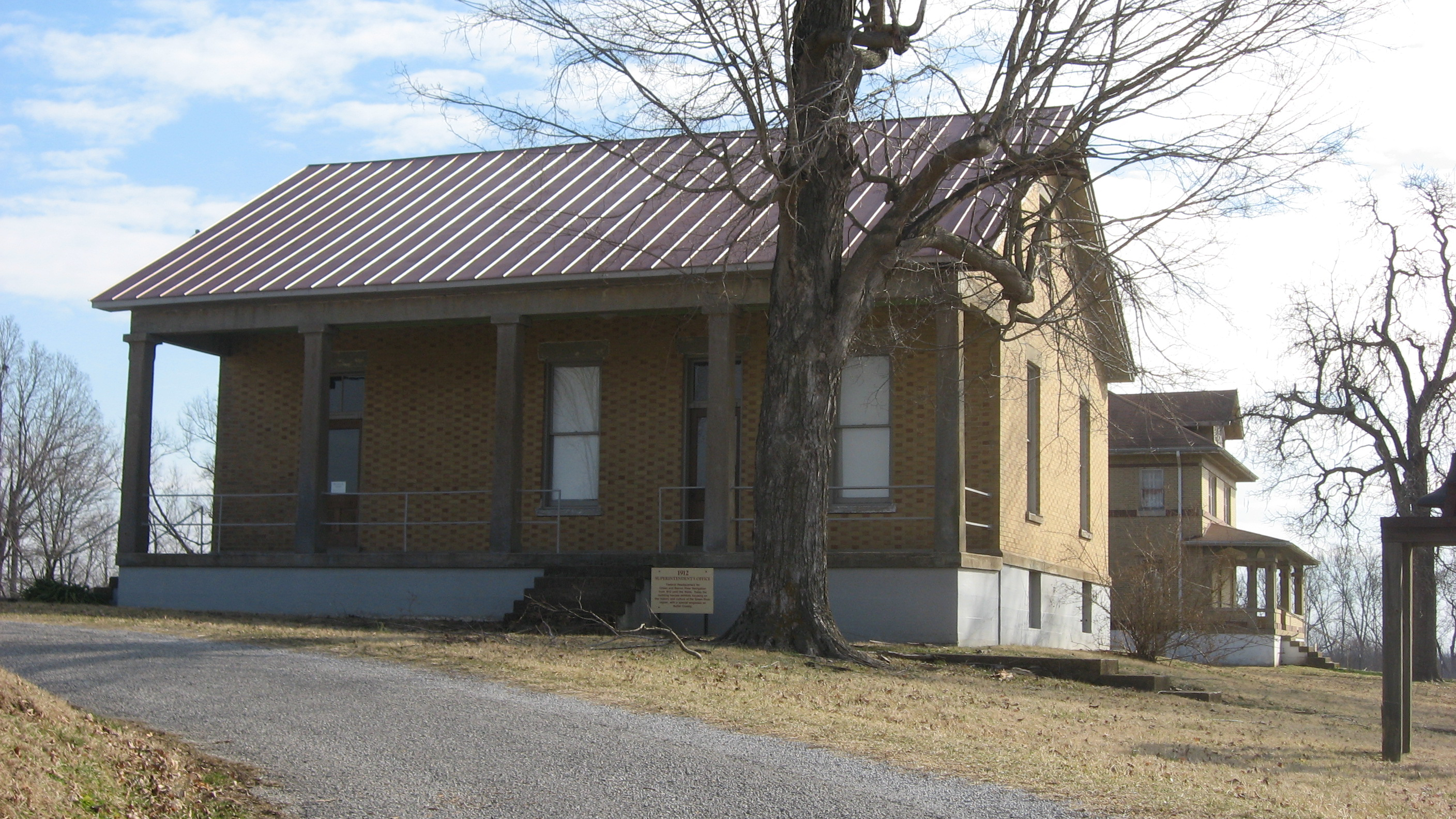

- Location within Kentucky Location within the United States
- Location: Woodbury Park, Woodbury, Kentucky Woodbury Park
- Coordinates: 37°11′05″N 86°37′56″W
- Area: 1.6 acres (0.65 ha)
- Built: 1912-13 (house); c.1889 (office)
- Engineer: F.I. Louckes, Jr.
- NRHP reference No.: 80001489
- Added to NRHP: June 19, 1980

The U.S. Army Corps of Engineers Superintendent's House and Workmen's Office, in Woodbury Park, Woodbury, Kentucky, was listed on the National Register of Historic Places in 1980.

The listing is for two buildings on a high bluff:

- the superintendent's house (1912–13), a 30 by 35 feet (9.1 m × 10.7 m) two-story Flemish bond brick house with a wraparound porch, and
- a one-and-a-half-story office Flemish bond brick building (c.1889)

They are located on Federal Hill, overlooking Lock and Dam #4 of the Green River, within an 8.5 acres (3.4 ha) Butler County park.

At the time of the 1980 NRHP nomination, the buildings had been vacant since 1973, when the U.S. Army Corps of Engineers moved its last employee out of Woodbury.

== See also ==
- Finney Hotel, 1890 hotel also in Woodbury Park and NRHP-listed
