= Highview, Louisville =

Neighborhood in Louisville, Kentucky, USA

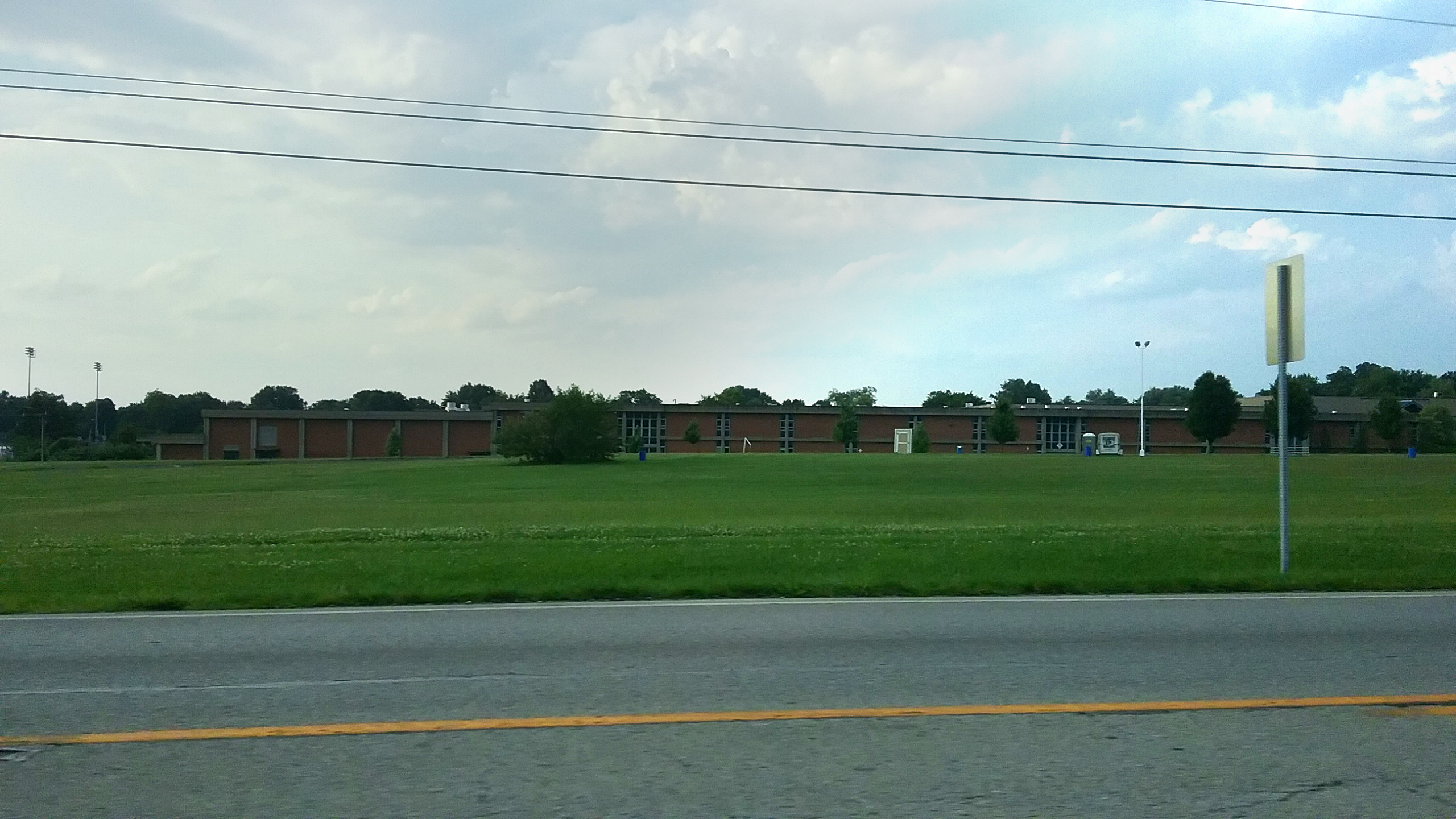
Front of Marion C. Moore High School

Highview is a former census-designated place in Jefferson County, Kentucky, United States. The population was 15,161 at the 2000 census. On January 6, 2003, the area was annexed to the city of Louisville due to a merger between the city and Jefferson County's unincorporated communities. Highview is now a neighborhood within the city limits of Louisville.

== About ==
Highview is located in between Okolona and Ferncreek. As like Okolona and Ferncreek it began to thrive in the 1950s and 1960s, quickly becoming suburbs and neighborhoods. Highview also co-exists with Springmill and Hollow Creek, which are a part of Highview in itself as a whole. In 1969 there needed to be a high school in the Highview area. As building began the school was originally going to be named Highview High School; it was quickly changed and renamed Marion C. Moore High School after Marion C. Moore, one of the four original counselors in the Jefferson County schools and also a former teacher and principal. The school is in the Highview area and was built to relieve overcrowding at Fern Creek and Southern High School. In Highview there are three major private schools: St. Bernard, a Catholic School; St. Athanasius, a Catholic School; and Whitefield Academy, a Christian school. Highview also has a park known as Highview Park.

== Geography ==
Highview is located at 38°08′34″N 85°37′27″W.

According to the United States Census Bureau, the CDP has a total area of 16.8 km^{2} (6.5 mi^{2}), all land.

== Demographics ==
Historical population
Census	Pop.	Note	%±
1980	13,286		—
1990	14,814		11.5%
2000	15,161		2.3%

At the 2000 census there were 15,161 people, 5,919 households, and 4,385 families in the CDP. The population density was 903.3/km^{2} (2,338.2/mi^{2}). There were 6,183 housing units at an average density of 368.4/km^{2} (953.6/mi^{2}). The racial makeup of the CDP was 89.29% White, 7.78% African American, 0.16% Native American, 0.77% Asian, 0.05% Pacific Islander, 0.81% from other races, and 1.13% from two or more races. Hispanic or Latino of any race were 2.02%.

Of the 5,919 households 31.2% had children under the age of 18 living with them, 60.3% were married couples living together, 10.4% had a female householder with no husband present, and 25.9% were non-families. 21.7% of households were one person and 8.1% were one person aged 65 or older. The average household size was 2.56 and the average family size was 2.98.

The age distribution was 23.4% under the age of 18, 8.0% from 18 to 24, 30.4% from 25 to 44, 25.2% from 45 to 64, and 12.9% 65 or older. The median age was 38 years. For every 100 females, there were 96.0 males. For every 100 females age 18 and over, there were 91.4 males.

The median household income was $48,734 and the median family income was $53,225. Males had a median income of $37,862 versus $27,410 for females. The per capita income for the CDP was $21,540. About 2.6% of families and 4.3% of the population were below the poverty line, including 5.1% of those under age 18 and 5.8% of those age 65 or over.

15.4% have a bachelor's degree or higher, 14.9% don't have a high school degree.
