= Rough River =

River in Kentucky, United States

Coordinates: 37.4853246°N 87.1349965°W

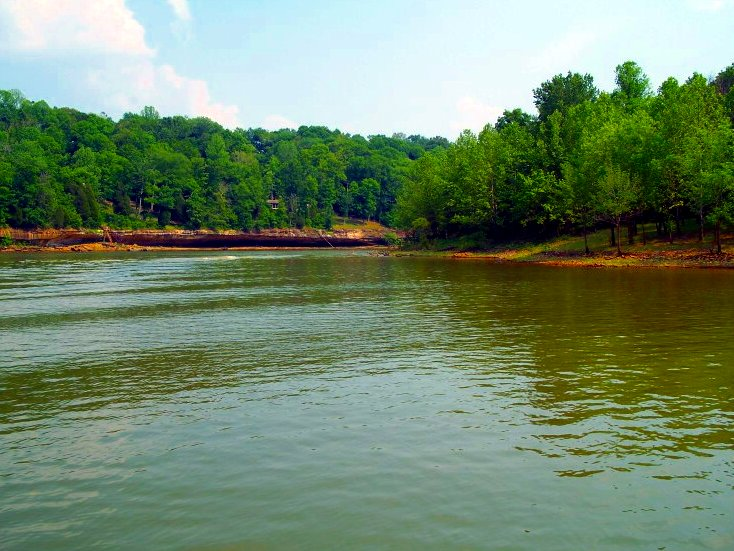
Rough River Lake near Leitchfield, Kentucky

The Rough River is a 136-mile-long (219 km) tributary of the Green River in west-central Kentucky in the United States. It is located about 70 miles southwest of Louisville, and flows through Breckinridge, Hardin, Grayson, and Ohio counties. Via the Green and Ohio rivers, it is part of the watershed of the Mississippi River. According to the Geographic Names Information System, it has also been known historically as "Rough Creek". In the 1950s it was dammed, creating Rough River Lake.

== Wildlife ==
Rough River has an immense amount of terrestrial wildlife, which includes amphibians, mammals, and birds. Because of the diverse amount of habitats, hundreds of different species live along the lake. The Kentucky Department of Fish and Wildlife has licensed thousands of acres of land dedicated to wildlife. There are 49 known mammal species inhabiting the lake. Cotton-tail rabbit, gray squirrels, fox, muskrat, woodchuck, raccoon and skunk are a few of the mammals seen at this lake.

Grasslands and marshes inhabit many different species of birds, including dove, quail, and sandhill cranes. Among these birds, quails, mallards, and doves are the most hunted.

Fishing is one of the most popular tourist activities at this lake. It averages about 300 pounds of fish per acre. The upper region of the lake is slightly more fertile (more nutrient-rich) than the lower region. Different species of fish in the lake include: spotted bass, largemouth bass, hybrid striped bass, catfish, crappie, bluegill, and white bass.

== Vegetation ==
The lakes vegetation consists of forests, pastureland, and cropland. Near streams you can find sycamore, red maple, birch, hemlock, hackberry, and sweet gum trees. Most of the lake is made up of oak-hickory forests. This is accurate for the areas that have been preserved as being wooded areas. In other areas near the dam, the space has been maintained in mowed grass as well as being developed for recreational use (tourism) and access to the tailwater and stilling basin.

Rough River's basin is different than others similarly sized, because it encompasses four Level VI ecoregions. These four ecoregions are the Knobs-Norman Upland, the Crawford-Mammoth Cave Uplands, the Caseyville Hills, and the Mitchel Plain. Majority encompasses the Crawford-Mammoth Cave Uplands with small coverage of the others.

== Wetlands ==
A variety of freshwater wetlands exist along the lake. These wetlands are seasonally flooded, which means surface water is present for extended periods early in the growing season, but is absent by the end of the season. Some wetlands are seasonally flooded, while others are temporarily flooded. The water usually lies well below the ground surface for most of the growing season.

== Course ==
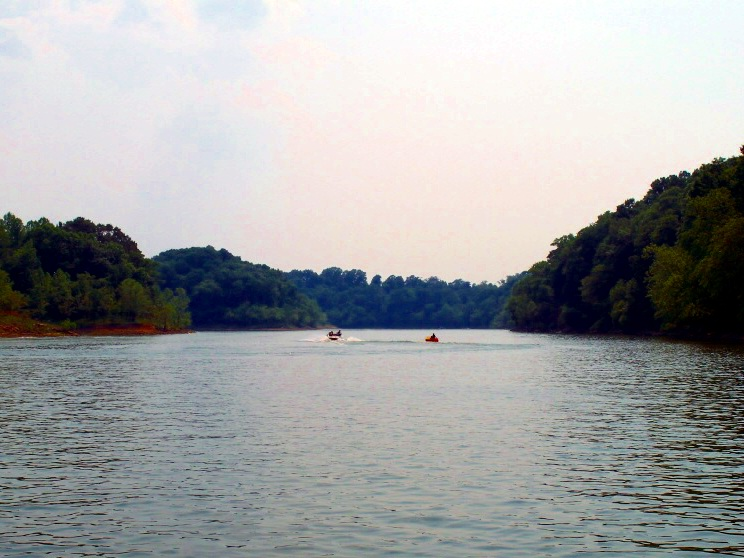
People swimming in Rough River

The Rough River rises in northwestern Hardin County and flows generally west-southwestwardly through or along the boundaries of Grayson, Breckinridge, Ohio and McLean counties, past the town of Hartford. It joins the Green River at the town of Livermore, on the common boundary of McLean and Ohio counties.

On the boundary of Breckinridge and Grayson counties, the Rough was dammed by the U.S. Army Corps of Engineers in 1959 to form Rough River Lake, originally called Rough River Reservoir. The lake includes the 29.5-mile-long (47.5 km) North Fork of Rough River, which flows for its entire length in Breckinridge County.

The Rough River has a mean annual discharge of 1,169 cubic feet per second near Dundee.

== See also ==
- List of Kentucky rivers
