= John Carson House =

- U.S. National Register of Historic Places
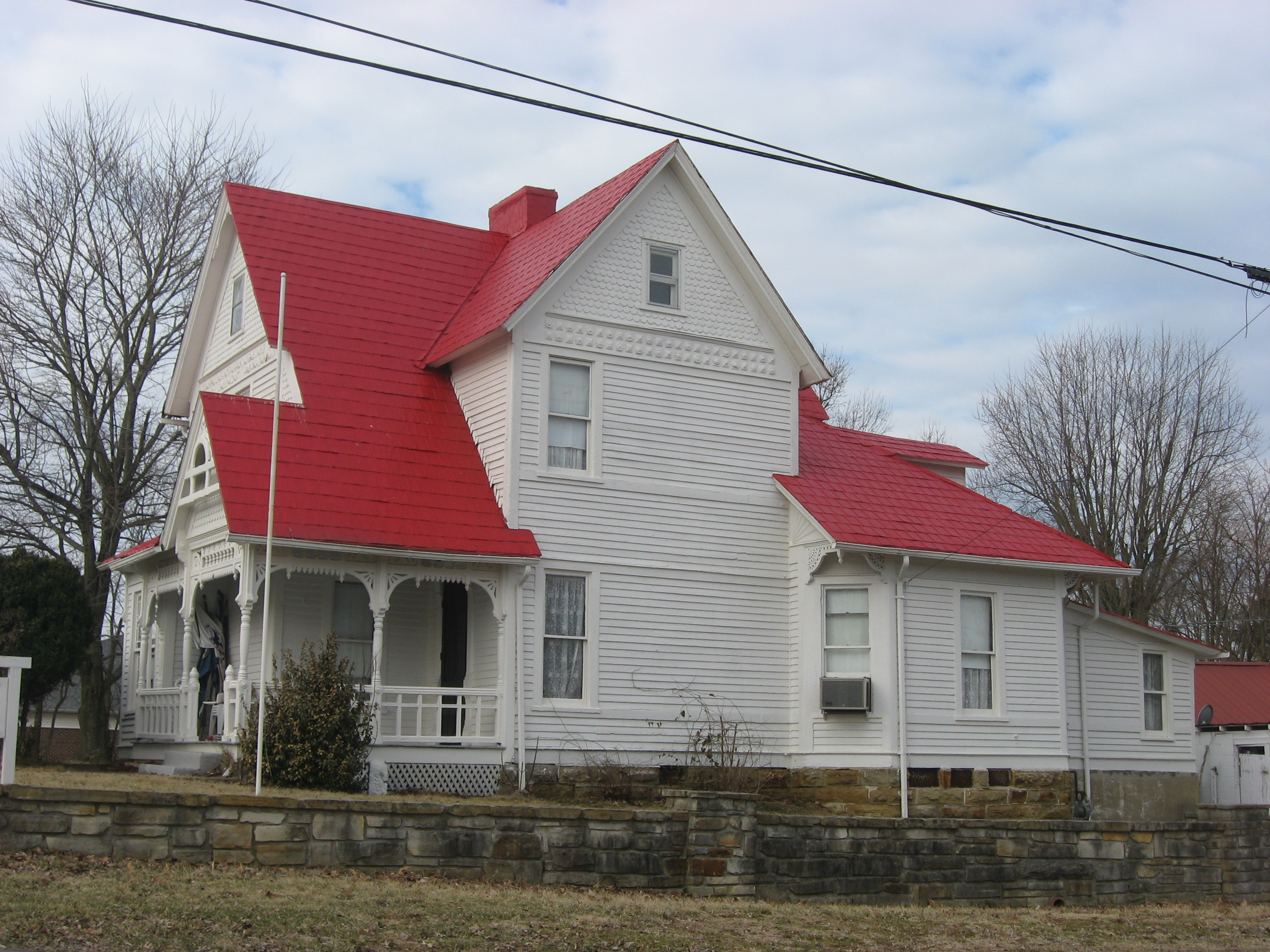
- Location: 205 S. Main St., Morgantown, Kentucky
- Coordinates: 37°13′28″N 86°41′06″W
- Area: less than one acre
- Built: 1890
- Architectural style: Queen Anne
- NRHP reference No.: 91000922
- Added to NRHP: July 26, 1991

The John Carson House, at 205 S. Main St. in Morgantown, Kentucky, is a historic Queen Anne-style house built in 1890. It was listed on the National Register of Historic Places in 1991.

It is a two-and-a-half-story house.

A second contributing building on the property is a one-story frame building which originally served as servants quarters.
