= Skilesville, Kentucky =

Unincorporated community in Kentucky, United States

- Unincorporated community
- Location within Kentucky Location within the United States
- Coordinates: 37°12′51″N 86°54′11″W
- Country: United States
- State: Kentucky
- County: Muhlenberg
- Elevation: 400 ft (120 m)
- Time zone: UTC-6 (Central (CST))
  - Summer (DST): UTC-5 (CDT)
- Area code: 270
- GNIS feature ID: 509070

Skilesville is an unincorporated community in Muhlenberg County, Kentucky, United States. Skilesville is located on the Green River and Kentucky Route 70 on the eastern border of Muhlenberg County, 0.6 miles (0.97 km) west of Rochester.

== History ==
A post office called Skilesville was established in 1878, and remained in operation until 1907. The community was named for James Skiles, a riverboat operator.
