= Rumsey, Kentucky =

Unincorporated community in Kentucky, United States

- Unincorporated community
- Location within Kentucky Location within the United States
- Coordinates: 37°31′55″N 87°15′29″W
- Country: United States
- State: Kentucky
- County: McLean
- Elevation: 381 ft (116 m)
- Time zone: UTC-6 (Central (CST))
  - Summer (DST): UTC-5 (CDT)
- ZIP codes: 42371
- GNIS feature ID: 502467

Rumsey is an unincorporated community in McLean County, Kentucky, United States.

== History ==
Rumsey had its start in the 1830s when a lock and dam was built at that point on the Green River. Rumsey was incorporated in 1839. It is named either for Kentucky Congressman Edward Rumsey or his uncle, James Rumsey, who invented the steamboat. Historian Otto Rothert records that the most commonly accepted explanation is that the community's citizens wanted to name it in honor of Edward Rumsey, but Rumsey declined their offer out of modesty, whereupon they compromised by retaining the name "Rumsey" and declaring it to be in honor of his uncle, James.

== Geography ==
The community is located in the central part of McLean County at coordinates 37°31′55″N 87°15′29″W. It is located along the southern banks of the Green River opposite county seat Calhoun. Kentucky Routes 81 and 138 traverses the community.
