= National Register of Historic Places listings in Ohio County, Kentucky =

Location of Ohio County in Kentucky

This is a list of the National Register of Historic Places listings in Ohio County, Kentucky.

This is intended to be a complete list of the properties and districts on the National Register of Historic Places in Ohio County, Kentucky, United States. The locations of National Register properties and districts for which the latitude and longitude coordinates are included below, may be seen in a map.

There are 19 properties and districts listed on the National Register in the county, of which 1 is a National Historic Landmark and 6 are part of another National Historic Landmark spread across multiple counties.

This National Park Service list is complete through NPS recent listings posted March 21, 2025.

== Current listings ==
	Name on the Register	Image	Date listed	Location	City or town	Description
1	Archeological Site KHC-6 (15OH97)		April 1, 1986 (#86000655)	Foot of Kirtley-River Rd. at the Green River above Livermore; 37°26′12″N 87°06′08″W	Kirtley	Part of the Green River Shell Middens Archeological District National Historic Landmark
2	J.T. Barnard Shell Midden (KHC-1)		April 1, 1986 (#86000669)	Across the Green River from South Carrollton; 37°20′12″N 87°07′48″W	Central City	Part of the Green River Shell Middens Archeological District National Historic Landmark
3	Bowles Site (15OH13)		April 1, 1986 (#86000656)	Northern side of the Green River opposite Rochester; 37°12′51″N 86°53′52″W	Rochester	Part of the Green River Shell Middens Archeological District National Historic Landmark
4	Ceralvo Masonic Hall and School		October 15, 2015 (#15000655)	942 Ceralvo Rd. 37°21′59″N 87°01′52″W	Centertown	
5	Chiggerville Site (15OH1)		April 1, 1986 (#86000665)	Right bank of the Green River, 3 miles (4.8 km) above the Paradise Fossil Plant; 37°14′25″N 86°56′29″W	Knightsburg	Part of the Green River Shell Middens Archeological District National Historic Landmark
6	Downtown Hartford Historic District	Downtown Hartford Historic District	December 12, 1988 (#88002760)	Roughly the 100 and 200 blocks of Main St. and Courthouse Sq. 37°27′04″N 86°54′32″W	Hartford	
7	Dundee Masonic Lodge No. 733	Dundee Masonic Lodge No. 733	March 25, 2008 (#08000213)	11640 Kentucky Route 69 N. 37°33′25″N 86°46′22″W	Dundee	
8	Hartford Seminary	Hartford Seminary	June 19, 1973 (#73000826)	224 E. Center St. 37°27′07″N 86°54′23″W	Hartford	
9	Samuel E. Hill House	Samuel E. Hill House	May 27, 1980 (#80001663)	519 E. Union St. 37°27′28″N 86°54′16″W	Hartford	
10	Indian Knoll		October 15, 1966 (#66000362)	Right bank of the Green River opposite the Paradise Fossil Plant at Paradise; 37°15′50″N 86°58′24″W	Paradise	
11	Jackson Bluff Site (15OH12)		April 1, 1986 (#86000666)	Address Restricted	Rockport	
12	Jimtown Site (15OH19)		April 1, 1986 (#86000667)	Jimtown Hill, 2 miles (3.2 km) above Livermore; 37°28′00″N 87°06′32″W	Kirtley	Part of the Green River Shell Middens Archeological District National Historic Landmark
13	Louisville, Henderson, and St. Louis Railroad Depot	Louisville, Henderson, and St. Louis Railroad Depot	July 26, 1991 (#91000923)	Southeastern side of Walnut St., 200 feet north of its junction with Kentucky Route 54; 37°38′11″N 86°43′01″W	Fordsville	
14	Bill Monroe Farm	Bill Monroe Farm	July 18, 2003 (#03000648)	Approximately 2 miles west of the junction of U.S. Route 62 and Kentucky Route 1544; 37°25′58″N 86°45′53″W	Rosine	
15	Old Town Historic District	Old Town Historic District	November 15, 1988 (#88002535)	Roughly bounded by E. Union, Clay, E. Washington and Liberty Sts. 37°27′08″N 86°54′24″W	Hartford	
16	Pendleton House	Pendleton House	May 17, 1973 (#73000827)	403 E. Union St. 37°27′17″N 86°54′21″W	Hartford	
17	Rosine General Store and Barn	Rosine General Store and Barn	August 1, 2003 (#03000708)	8205 Blue Moon of Kentucky Highway/ U.S. Route 62; 37°27′03″N 86°44′28″W	Rosine	
18	Smallhous Shell Mound (15OH10)		April 1, 1986 (#86000668)	Right bank of the Green River at Smallhous; 37°22′49″N 87°05′33″W	Smallhous	Part of the Green River Shell Middens Archeological District National Historic Landmark
19	Charles Wallace House		March 15, 1984 (#84001890)	Address Restricted	Hartford	

== See also ==
- List of National Historic Landmarks in Kentucky
- National Register of Historic Places listings in Kentucky
