= K-Country =

K-Country may refer to:

== Radio stations ==
"K-Country" is a brand used by multiple radio stations:

In Canada

- CKOU-FM, Georgina, Ontario, Canada

In the United States

- KKQQ, Brookings, South Dakota
- KNUI, Wailuku, Hawaii
- KQIK (AM), Lakeview, Oregon (?-2011)
- KTPK, Topeka, Kansas (1992-1995)
- WEKV (FM), Central City, Kentucky (1989/90-1993)
- WGJK, Rome, Georgia
- WGRK-FM, Greensburg, Kentucky
- WJDK-FM, Seneca, Illinois
- WJPA, Washington, Pennsylvania (1983-early 1990s)
- WKMM, Kingwood, West Virginia
- WNES, Central City, Kentucky
- WOGK, Ocala, Florida
- WMAN-FM, Fredericktown, Ohio (1992-?)
- WVOK-FM, Oxford, Alabama (1983-?)

== Other uses ==
- Kananaskis Country (abbr. "K-Country"), Alberta, Canada

== See also ==
- KNMO-FM, a radio station in Nevada, Missouri branded as "Double K Country"
- List of countries, for countries starting with "K"
