= KQIK =

KQIK may refer to:

- KQIK-FM, a radio station (105.9 FM) licensed to serve Haileyville, Oklahoma, United States
- KORV, a radio station (93.5 FM) licensed to serve Lakeview, Oregon, United States, which held the call sign KQIK-FM from 1986 to 1993 and 1994 to 2011
- KQIK (AM), a defunct radio station (1230 AM) formerly licensed to serve Lakeview, Oregon
