= Pendleton House =

Pendleton House may refer to:

in the United States (by state then city)

- William Kimbrough Pendleton House, Eustis, Florida, listed on the NRHP in Lake County
- Col. Edmund Pendleton House, Clintonville, Kentucky, listed on the NRHP in Clark County
- Pendleton House (Falmouth, Kentucky), listed on the NRHP in Pendleton County
- Pendleton House (Hartford, Kentucky), listed on the NRHP in Ohio County
- James G. Pendleton House, Searsport, Maine, listed on the NRHP in Waldo County
- Pendleton Ruin, Animas, New Mexico, listed on the NRHP in Hidalgo County
- George Hunt Pendleton House, Cincinnati, Ohio, listed on the NRHP
