= WKYA =

Radio station in Greenville, Kentucky

- Greenville, Kentucky; United States
- Frequency: 105.5 MHz
- Branding: WKYA 105.5

Programming
- Format: Oldies

Ownership
- Owner: Radio Active Media, Inc.
- Sister stations: WNES, WXMZ

History
- First air date: December 22, 1981; 44 years ago
- Former call signs: WGKY-FM (1979–1990); WWHK (1990–1996)

Technical information
- Licensing authority: FCC
- Facility ID: 26491
- Class: A
- ERP: 3,000 watts
- HAAT: 91 meters
- Transmitter coordinates: 37°11′45″N 87°12′38″W

Links
- Public license information: Public file; LMS

WKYA (105.5 FM) is a radio station licensed to Greenville, Kentucky, United States. The station is currently owned by Radio Active Media, Inc. and broadcasts an oldies format.

The station's studio (shared with sister station WNES and its translator W284AO) and transmitter is located on Everly Brothers Boulevard (U.S. Highway 62) near the Western Kentucky Parkway underpass southwest of Central City.

According to the 2015 FCC ownership report, the licensee is Andy Anderson, who also owns the Greenville Leader-News, the local newspaper. Andy Anderson is the son of the station's founder of the same name.

== History ==
The station went on the air as WGKY-FM on December 22, 1981.

On July 9, 1990, the station changed its call sign to WWHK to reflect the new branding, “105.5 The Hawk”. Then in 1994, the station began simulcasting the adult contemporary format with now-defunct sister station WAIA in nearby Hartford, in neighboring Ohio County.

On October 1, 1996, the station's callsign was changed to the current WKYA upon changing their format to country music. On February 1, 2004, WKYA discontinued their country format in favor of oldies.
