= Indian Knoll =

Archaeological site in Kentucky, US

- U.S. National Register of Historic Places
- Location within Kentucky Location within the United States
- Nearest city: Paradise, Muhlenberg County, Kentucky
- Area: 290 acres (120 ha)
- NRHP reference No.: 66000362
- Added to NRHP: October 15, 1966

Indian Knoll is an archaeological site near the Green River in Ohio County, Kentucky that was declared to be a U.S. National Historic Landmark.

Excavations of Indian Knoll during the Great Depression were conducted by archaeologists from the University of Kentucky as part of WPA economic recovery efforts. Research of the remains and artifacts in the 1960s-1970s demonstrated that its builders were greatly atypical of inhabitants of Archaic sites. Archaic peoples were typically egalitarian, but burials at this knoll revealed that the inhabitants were divided into two social groups, irrespective of age or sex, and social class seems the most likely reason for this division.

== Background ==
The Indian Knoll site, designated 15OH2, is located in the Ohio Valley of west central Kentucky near Green River. This area is known as the "shell mound region" because of the large shell middens, or deposits of shell that were disposed of by the indigenous people that lived there. Though there is evidence of earlier settlement, this area was most heavily occupied from approximately 3000–2000 BC, when the climate and vegetation were nearing modern conditions. This floodplain provided a stable environment, which eventually led to agricultural development early in the late Holocene era. In the early 20th century Clarence Bloomfield Moore was the first to explore a small portion of the land not being used for agricultural purposes. After the farm that occupied the site was destroyed by a flood, the land was opened for further excavation by William Snyder Webb in 1939. The study of this site has contributed towards an understanding of the social complexity of the southeastern cultures of the mid-late Holocene era.

== Excavations ==
The original excavation in 1915 was led by C.B. Moore and his crew of eight men. He was the first to report on the bannerstone at Indian Knoll and recover 298 individuals, 66 of which were well preserved and sent to the United States National Museum. After the flood in 1937, Webb and his team began a second excavation, leading to the discovery of 880 more burials. The Indian Knoll skeletal population was inadequately evaluated by Moore, so in 1960, the remains were reassessed by Francis Johnston and Charles Snow. From the skeletal fragments, they estimated there to be at least 1,234 individuals, rather than 1,178 reported between Moore and Webb. Johnston and Snow concluded that Indian Knoll had a high infant mortality rate, mostly only under one year, but also many under four. The average life span was about 18.5 years old, with slightly more male burials than female.

== Initial excavation ==
The 1939 excavations included trenches paralleling the Green River, which contained over 1000 burials, and evidence of ancient dwellings with burned clay flooring, six hearths, and what Webb noted as kitchen fireside tools, or artifacts such as hammerstones, grooved axes, pitted stones, mortars and pestles. There were also some 67,000 artifacts uncovered at Indian Knoll, some of which were carbon dated, and thought to be an average of about 5,300 years old. These dwellings are considered to be permanent occupations. The hearths were probably used for heating during the winter as well as cooking. The shell middens nearby contain not only the remains of the gastropod shells, but debris of animal bone and fire-cracked rock such as sandstone and river pebbles, probably used for cooking, boiling water, and processing walnuts, hickory nuts, and acorns.

== Burials and grave goods ==
The earlier graves at Indian Knoll were found down to five feet into the sand, with the more recent burials inside the shell midden. The deepest were better preserved as a result of the moist sand, even some of the bony tissues and infant skeletons remained intact. The grave structure was usually small, round, and filled in with black midden debris. The burials inside the midden showed no sign of formal walls, thus it is likely that individuals were placed in shallow depressions and filled in with the surrounding shell midden. Many of the skeletons placed in shallow graves, especially the skulls, were crushed and shown signs of disturbance. Most of the skeletons were found in tight coiled positions, which indicates the bodies may have been wrapped, though there are a few instances of being placed sitting up, with even less fully extended . The large number of burials caused graves to intrude into others accidentally, though multiple burials were common practice during the time the shell midden formed between the years 5500 and 2000 BC. Multiple burials were also typically circular, but larger and lacked grave goods except for single projectile points near the chest cavities, which suggest violence near time of death. Many skeletons were found dismembered, either unintentionally or as an act of mutilation. If a grave happened to be dug intruding another, the original body may have become dismembered, but normally the bones would have been piled up and reburied. Occasionally pieces, such as skulls or limbs, were not recovered, which Robert Mensforth considered evidence for warfare and trophy taking. Grave goods were found within 187 burials, though shell beads, used for personal adornments or sewed on garments, were not counted as a deliberate grave goods in one study.[23] The artifacts commonly associated with graves include pestles, hammerstones, grooved axes, projectile points with a few cases of copper and stone vessels. There were 43 atlatl weights, also known as bannerstones for spear-thowers, associated with burials at Indian Knoll, and Webb's research focus when excavating this site to get more information on this particular grave good.

== Dog burials ==
During the excavations, 21 dog burials were found.The graves of dogs were given the same attention as human graves, with nine examples of dogs buried with humans at Indian Knoll. The dogs within human burials were associated with women and children, as much as with men. These dogs were apparently killed at the time of their owner's death and placed on top, below their feet, or at their side. According to Cheryl Claassen, at least six out of the ten dogs with humans show possible evidence of a violent death. The position of the human skeleton in these cases was usually face down and devoid of artifacts. The only double dog and face down human burial occurs with a female child about the age of five, suggesting that the child's death may have been related to ritual. Claassen also suggest that these dogs were not only beloved pets, but had symbolic and ritual significance. A similar belief about the healing nature of dogs is seen across Native American myths. Some interpretations held by the Cherokee are that dogs are spiritual guides and judges, that symbolized morality and were considered sacred. Another possible meaning considered by Claassen is that dogs were used to represent warriors whose bodies were never retrieved from war. This has been speculated because there were male dogs in single burials.

== Social complexity ==
There are several indicators of long-distance contact with other Late Archaic groups present at the Indian Knoll site including exotic materials and signs of warfare. The social organization of Archaic cultures has been broadly stereotyped as being small band or tribal communities of hunter-gatherers, with few possessions and lacking permanent villages, food production, and pottery. These cultures typically determined social statuses by age, sex, and personal achievement, because there were little differences in wealth or possessions. Analysis of these artifacts and remains provide a better understanding of social organization during the late Archaic. Grave goods or tools were mainly associated men, but in this community women and children were with one or many artifacts. This suggests status was not restricted by age or sex, according to N. A. Rothschild. Some labor division is apparent, given the different types of artifacts commonly found among the two sexes. For example, men were buried with axes, stone and woodworking tools, fish hooks, and awls in contrast to the shells, bone beads and nut cracking stones usually found with females. The most abundant material found in graves were several types of shell, manufactured into a variety of forms, such as beads and buttons worn as personal adornments. Some of these species were not local, which could indicate wealth and status, and also shows evidence of long distant exchange networks with other Archaic cultures. The Busycon, Marginella, and Olivella shell species were imported from the Gulf of Mexico or Atlantic coast, and were found at this site but rarely in burials which suggest they were probably considered valuable. A couple pieces of copper, another foreign material found at Indian Knoll, shows trade extending as far north as Lake Superior.

Archaic trade networks took the form of what Claassen calls "down-the-line-transfer," or resources and gifts were passed from village to village, rather than at large trade fairs. This informal exchange network seems more likely because it involved fewer individuals and had less influence over cultural traditions. By 2000 BC, regional variation in style of tools was visible, such as the variations in design and function of atlatl weights, or bannerstones used primarily to center the weight of a throwing stick. By this time, communities had well established control over territory and resources, causing an increase in tension and warfare. Relationships between neighbors are assumed to have had greater importance with the increases in exchange systems, and hunting or war parties. By 1000 BC status differentiation is noticeable in the grave goods. The degree of violence in the region is notable and many individuals showed signs of fatal injuries such as one scalping, a slit throat, and a skull smashed in. Also many had multiple puncture marks and fractured or missing bones, serving as evidence of warfare and trophy taking. Many of the dismembered bodies were missing skulls and limbs and were never recovered, indicating trophy taking. However, one trophy in the form of a human mandible was recovered from Indian Knoll. But, controversially, archaeologist Cheryl Claassen theorizes that the deaths were not due to inter-group violence, but rather because of a potential form of ritualization. In all, it is estimated that the 12 incomplete skeletons may have presented as many as 34 human bone trophies to the opposing members. Most of the injuries reported are caused from blunt force trauma, but were usually not fatal, suggesting well-defined rules to reduce death tolls for these organized war parties, rather than sporadic feuds.

== Pottery ==
Technological developments such as crude ceramics were developed by Archaic societies early during the late Holocene. A total of 792 shards of pottery were found at Indian Knoll. All of which were shell or grit tempered, mainly found within the first foot and a half of the mound, and closely relate to the later Mississippian culture's pottery. Most vessels had wide mouths and curved or flat bases, which were handmade by building up coils of clay. Pottery contributed to the exploitation and manipulation of wild plants, and more efficiency in food processing and water storage. The most common type of ceramics were shell tempered, representing 78.5% of the total pottery shards found at Indian Knoll, with only 171 grit tempered shards of bowls or jars discovered. Heavy grit tempered pottery appeared in different regions of the Eastern Woodlands, including Ohio Valley, between 2000 and 500 BC. The grit tempered ceramics that were found show plain and cord marked ware, as well as simple stamped grooved patterns. Several different finishes on shell tempered ceramics were also noted. Nine shards found in one were also cord marked, or tapped with a twisted fibers wrapped paddle, and three shards show signs of roughening, which were individually created by a rectangular object. Other shards show signs of net impressions caused by mesh fabrics, which is common in much of western Kentucky.

== Agriculture ==
The inhabitants of the Ohio Valley were complex hunter-gatherer societies who relied on food rich resources of the deciduous forest and floodplain, including both marine and terrestrial animals and plants. A constant crop of hickory nuts, acorns, roots, and seeds were utilized by the foragers of the area, as well as later domestication of squash in the Green River Region reveals an evident trend toward subsistence agriculture, though this has not been confirmed at Indian Knoll. This site was never fully excavated because of what Webb called, "difficulties arising from a shortage in the Works Progress Administration labor quota of the county," but little area was left unexplored. In 1966 Indian Knoll was designated a National Historic Landmark, and today the site lies within 290 acres of private agricultural fields.

== See also ==
- Archaic Dog Burials in the Midwest United States
- National Register of Historic Places listings in Ohio County, Kentucky

== Bibliography ==
- Claassen, Cheryl (1996). A Consideration of the Social Organization of the Shell Mound Archaic. University Press of Florida: Archaeology of the mid-Holocene southeast. pp. 235–258.
- Claassen, Cheryl. "Archaic Rituals: Rebalancing with Dogs". Academia.
- Fagan, Brian (2005). Ancient North America. London: Thames and Hudson Ltd. pp. 410–417.
- Haag, W.M.D. (1974). Pottery at Indian Knoll. Knoxville: The University of Tennessee Press. pp. 357–362.
- "Indian Knoll: Paradise, Kentucky". National Register of Historic Places. Find the best.
- Johnston, Francis; Snow, Charles (September 1961). "The Reassessment of the Age and Sex of the Indian Knoll Skeletal Populations: Demographical and Methodological Aspects". American Journal of Physical Anthropology. 19 (3): 237–244. doi:10.1002/ajpa.1330190304.
- Mensforth, Robert (2001). Warfare and Trophy Taking in the Archaic Period. Kent State University Press: Archaic Transitions in Ohio and Kentucky Prehistory. pp. 110–134.
- Rothschild ., N.A (October 1979). "Mortuary Behavior and Social Organization at Indian Knoll and Dickson Mounds". American Antiquity. 44 (4): 658–675. doi:10.2307/279105.
- Webb, William (1974). Indian Knoll. The University of Tennessee Press Knoxville. pp. 116–340.
- Pauketat, Timothy R. and Sassaman, Kenneth E. (2022). The Archaeology of Ancient North America. Cambridge University Press.
- Claasen, Cheryl (2013). Infanticide and sacrifices among Archaic babies of the central United States. World Archaeology: 45(2), 198–213.
