= Nicholas Porter Earp =

Father of the Western lawmen Earp family (1813–1907)

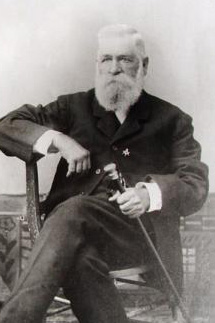
- Born: September 6, 1813; Lincoln County, North Carolina, U.S.
- Died: February 12, 1907 (aged 93); Sawtelle, California, U.S.
- Occupations: Soldier, farmer, cooper, constable, bootlegger, wagon-Master, teacher
- Spouse(s): Abigail Storm (m. 1836; died 1839) Virginia Cooksey (m. 1840; died 1893) Anna Elizabeth Cadd (m. 1893)
- Children: 10, including Newton, James, Virgil, Wyatt, Morgan, and Warren
- Military Service
- Allegiance: United States
- Branch: U.S. Army
- Service years: 1832; 1847-48
- Rank: Private; Sergeant
- Units: Illinois Militia; Stapp’s Illinois Mounted Volunteers
- Conflicts: Black Hawk War; Mexican–American War

Nicholas Porter Earp (September 6, 1813 – February 12, 1907) was the father of well-known Western lawmen Virgil, Wyatt, and Morgan, and their lesser-known brothers James, Newton and Warren Earp. He was a justice of the peace, a farmer, cooper, constable, bootlegger, wagon-master, and teacher.

== Early family life and military service ==
Nicholas Earp was born in Lincoln County, North Carolina, to Walter Earp and Martha Ann Early. The Earp family was of English and Scots-Irish descent. The first Earp immigrant to the American colonies was Thomas Earp Jr., who arrived in Anne Arundel County, Maryland, on July 6, 1674, as an indentured servant from Ireland. He is buried in St. Anne's Parish in Annapolis. Nicholas was named for a circuit-riding judge in Kentucky.

Nicholas' father Walter Earp was born in Montgomery County, Maryland, in 1787, a fifth-generation Marylander who later became a school teacher, Justice of the Peace in Monmouth, Illinois, and a Methodist Episcopal preacher.

Nicholas' mother, Martha Ann Early, was born in Avery County, North Carolina, on August 28, 1790. Nicholas was the third of ten children; his siblings include six brothers: Lorenzo Dow, Josiah Jackson, James Kelly, Francis Asbury, Jonathan Douglas and Walter C. (twins); as well as three sisters: Elizabeth, Mary Ann, and Sarah Ann. When Martha Earp died at age 91, she had eight living children, 85 grandchildren, 130 great-grandchildren and 13 great-great-grandchildren.

Soon after Nicholas' birth, the family moved from Virginia to Hartford, Kentucky, in 1813, where Nicholas spent the rest of his childhood. As a young man, Nicholas served in the Black Hawk War of 1831 and later was a sergeant in the Mexican–American War. During the Mexican–American War Nicholas served under Captain Wyatt Berry Stapp of the Illinois Mounted Volunteers.

=== Marriage ===
Nicholas originally intended to become a lawyer like his father, before moving his law practice and his family from North Carolina to Kentucky, where he took up farming. He was also a cooper and sheriff.

In 1845, Nicholas Earp, his wife Ginny, with their sons James, Virgil, and Newton, and their daughter Martha, relocated from Kentucky to the fertile farmland of western Illinois and settled in Monmouth, Illinois. In December 1847, Nicholas was a 33-year-old dragoon sergeant when he was kicked by a mule and seriously injured. He returned to Monmouth and his pregnant wife, Ginny. Four months later, he named his newborn son after his company's captain, whom he admired and respected.

== First marriage ==
On December 22, 1836, in Hartford, Nicholas Porter married Abigail Storm, the daughter of Peter and Anna Maria (Lehman) Sturm (born September 21, 1813 Ohio County, Kentucky – died October 8, 1839, Ohio County, Kentucky). They had two children:

- Newton Jasper Earp (October 7, 1837 Ohio County, Kentucky – December 18, 1928 Sacramento, California). Married Nancy Jane (Jennie) Adam.
- Mariah Ann Earp (February 12 – December 13, 1839), died two months after her mother at the age of ten months.

== Second marriage ==
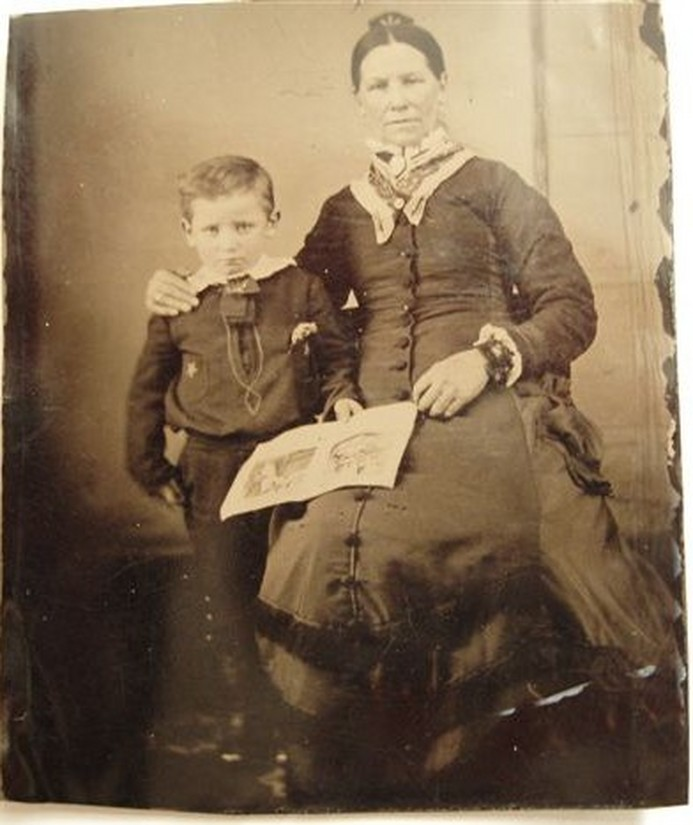
Wyatt Earp with his mother Virginia Ann Cooksey Earp c. 1856.

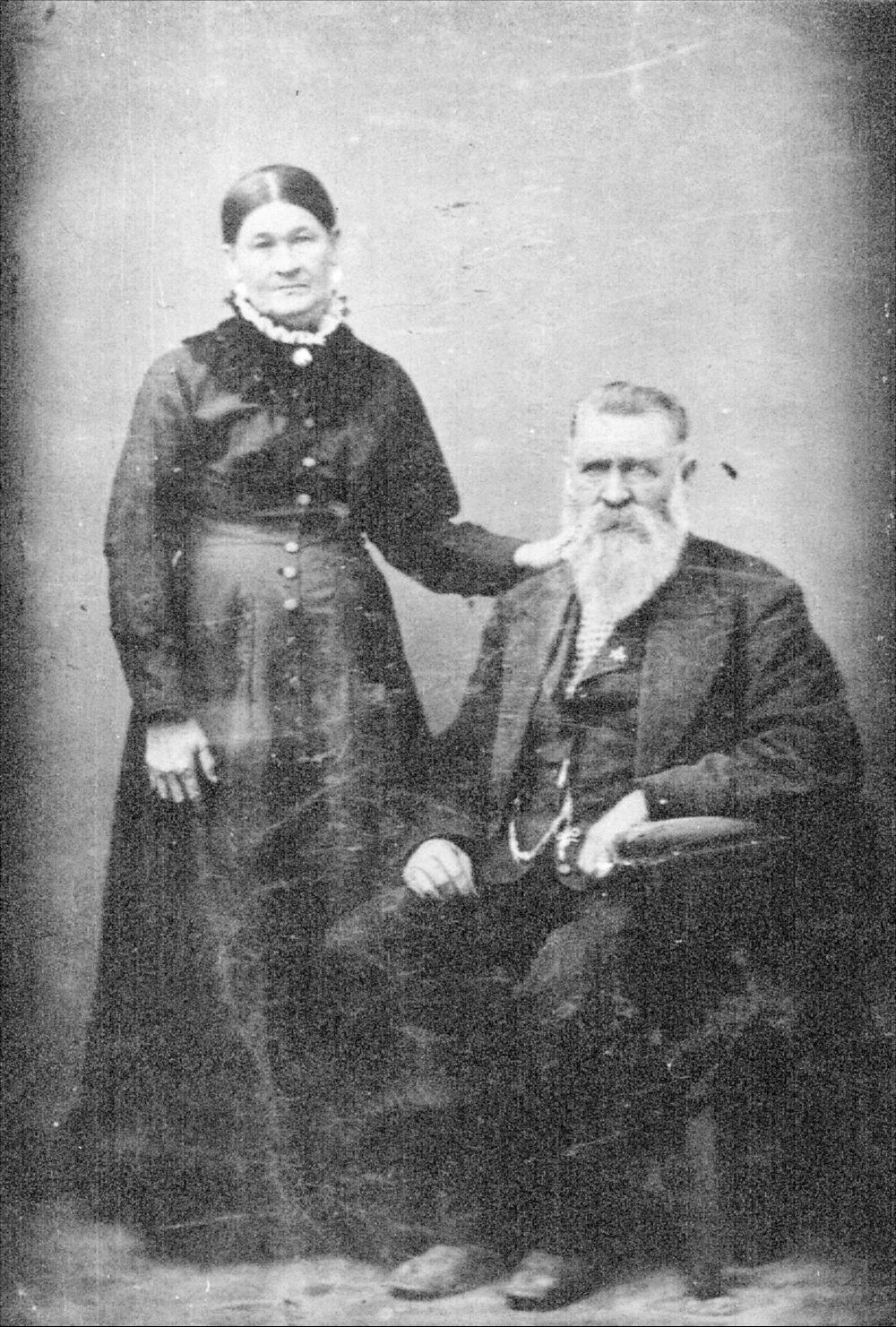
A formal portrait of Nicholas Earp and of his second wife, Virginia ("Ginny") Ann Cooksey Earp, c. 1880 to 1899

On July 30, 1840, Nicholas married Virginia Ann Cooksey in Hartford, Kentucky. They had eight children:

- James Cooksey Earp (June 28, 1841, in Hartford, Kentucky – January 25, 1926, in Los Angeles, California)
- Virgil Walter Earp (July 18, 1843, in Hartford, Kentucky – October 19, 1905, in Goldfield, Nevada)
- Martha Elizabeth Earp (September 25, 1845, in Monmouth, Illinois – May 26, 1856, in Monmouth, Illinois)
- Wyatt Berry Stapp Earp (March 19, 1848, in Monmouth, Illinois – January 13, 1929, in Los Angeles, California)
- Morgan Seth Earp (April 24, 1851, in Pella, Iowa – March 18, 1882, in Tombstone, Arizona)
- Warren Baxter Earp (always known as Warren) (March 9, 1855, in Pella, Iowa – July 6, 1900, in Willcox, Arizona)
- Virginia Ann Earp (February 28, 1858, in Marion County, Iowa – October 26, 1861, in Pella, Iowa)
- Adelia Douglas Earp (June 16, 1861, in Pella, Iowa – January 16, 1941, in San Bernardino, California)

=== Relocates to Iowa ===
In March 1849, Nicholas Earp joined about one hundred others from Monmouth County, Illinois, for a trip to California, where he planned to look for good farm land, not gold. He decided to move to San Bernardino County in the southern part of the state. Nicholas returned to Illinois and the family left for California but their daughter Martha, became ill and died. Nicholas changed plans and moved to Pella, Iowa.

=== Various occupations ===
Their new farm consisted of 160 acres (0.65 km^{2}), and was 7 miles (11 km) northeast of Pella, Iowa. Eight years later, on March 4, 1856, Nicholas sold his Pella, Iowa, farm to Aquillin Waters Noe (who resold it on the same day to Hiram Zenas Webster) and the family returned to Monmouth, Illinois, where Nicholas found that nobody needed his services as cooper or farmer.

Unable to find work, Nicholas was elected as the town constable, which he served as for about three years. In 1859, he was tried and convicted of bootlegging. Nicholas was unable to pay the court-imposed fines following his trial, and a lien was levied against the Earp's property. On November 11, 1859, the property was sold at auction. Two days later, the Earps left Monmouth and returned to Pella. Nicholas apparently made frequent travels to Monmouth throughout 1860 to confirm and conclude the sale of his properties and to face several lawsuits for debt and accusations of tax evasion.

=== Civil War service ===
During the Civil War, Nicholas served in Pella, Iowa, as a United States Provost Marshal for recruitment. His sons Newton, James, and Virgil enlisted in the Union Army on November 11, 1861. While his father was busy recruiting and drilling local companies, Wyatt, along with his two younger brothers, Morgan and Warren, were left in charge of tending the 80-acre (32 ha) corn crop. Only 13 years old, Wyatt was too young to enlist, but he tried on several occasions to run away and enlist. Each time his father found him and brought him home.

James was severely wounded in Fredericktown, Missouri, and returned home in the summer of 1863. Newton and Virgil fought several battles in the east before returning home.

=== Leads wagon train to California ===
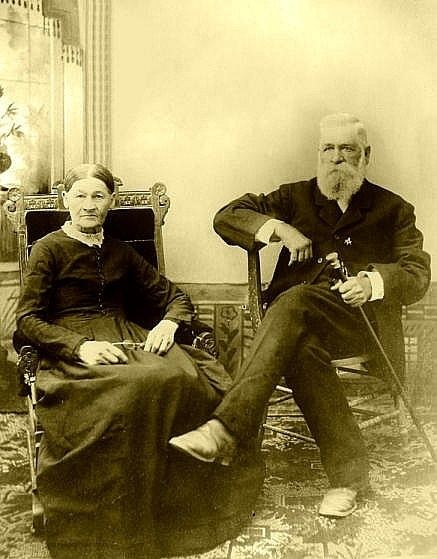
Nicholas Porter and Virginia (Cooksey) Earp on their 50th wedding anniversary, July 30, 1890

On May 12, 1864, Nicholas Earp was hired to lead a wagon train to California. The Earps took their children Wyatt, Jim, Morgan, Warren, and Adelia. The wagon train was initially composed of the Earp family plus three other families from Pella: the Rousseaus, the Hamiltons, and the Curtises. Seven more wagons joined them during the trip.

=== Reputation ===
According to the diaries of Utah emigrants in the wagon train, Nicholas was an irascible and difficult man to deal with. Sarah Jane Rousseau wrote in her diary during the seven-month trek that Nicholas Earp did not take well to backtalk: "It made him awful mad and he was for killing. He used very profane language and he could hardly be appeased."

On November 24, she wrote:

This evening Mr. Earp had another rippet [sic] with his son Warren [for] fighting [with] Jimmy Hatten. And then Mr. Earp raged about all the children, using very profane language and swearing that if the children's parents did not whip them as he did or correct their children, he would whip every last one of them himself. He shows every day what kind of man he really is. He is such an uncouth and foul-mouthed person I think we made a terrible mistake engaging him and furnishing him horses and provisions to lead this wagon train west.

=== Departure for California ===
The group arrived in San Bernardino, California, on December 17, 1864. Nicholas rented a farm on the banks of the Santa Ana River near present-day Redlands.

Within the next year Virgil got a job driving a freight wagon to Salt Lake City and took Wyatt with him. Afterward they took jobs with the Union Pacific, which was building the Transcontinental Railroad west from Omaha, Nebraska. Virgil worked as a teamster and Wyatt manned a pick and shovel. Not long after, their brothers Jim and Morgan left the family in San Bernardino and headed for the mining towns of Montana.

In spring 1868, Nick, Ginnie, Morgan, Warren, and Adelia returned to the Midwest and Lamar, Missouri, where Nicholas became the local constable. By November 17, 1869, Nicholas resigned to become Justice of the Peace. Wyatt, who had followed them to Missouri, was immediately appointed constable in place of his father. Both Wyatt and Morgan traveled from Peoria, Illinois, to home in Lamar, Missouri, to celebrate Adelia's eleventh birthday on June 16, 1872.

Some time prior to 1880, Nicholas and Virginia Earp moved back to California, settling in San Bernardino County. The 1880 United States Census shows the Nicholas Earp household included Warren and Morgan and his wife Louisa ("Lou"). Nicholas was recorded as a farmer. Nicholas was also one of the founders of the San Bernardino Society of California Pioneers. Morgan arrived in Tombstone, Arizona

== Third marriage and death ==
After Virginia's death on January 14, 1893, in San Bernardino, 80-year-old Nicholas married Annie Elizabeth Cadd on October 14 of the same year. His new wife, the widow of Ambrose Peck Alexander, was 50 years old. She had been born in 1842 in Preston Bissett, Buckingham, England. She died in 1931 and is buried near Virginia and Nellie Earp (wife of son James Earp) at the Pioneer Cemetery in San Bernardino.

Nicholas Earp died at The Soldier's Home in Sawtelle, California, on February 12, 1907, shortly after he was elected to the Los Angeles County court. He is buried in West Los Angeles at the Los Angeles National Cemetery. He had outlived six of his ten children.

== Descendants ==
Three of Nicholas' sons—Virgil, Wyatt, and Morgan—became well-known lawmen as a result of their part in the Gunfight at the O.K. Corral.

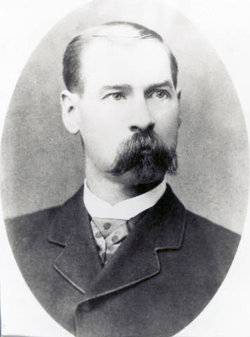
James Earp

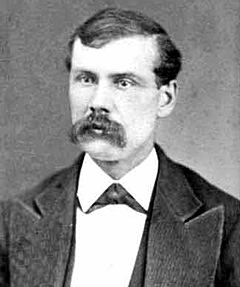
Virgil Earp

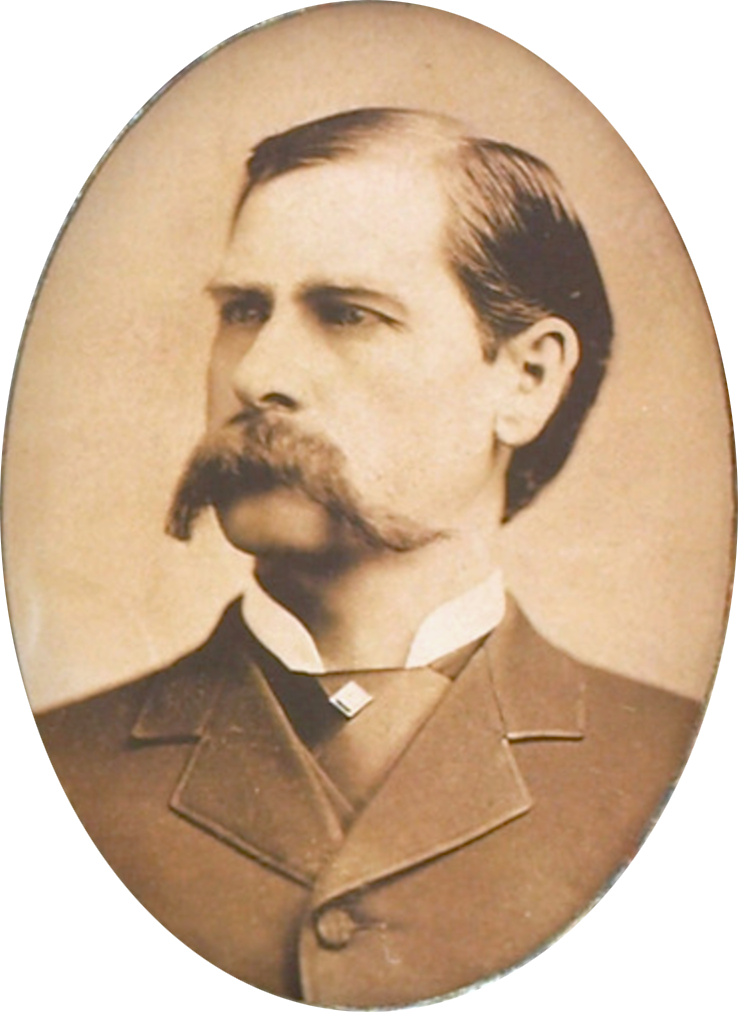
Wyatt Earp

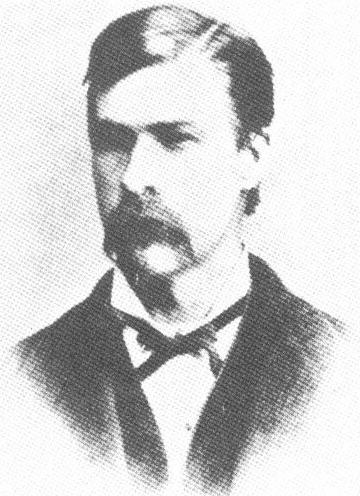
Morgan Earp

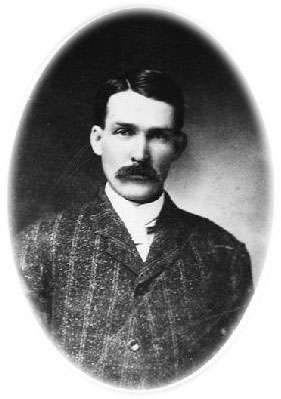
Warren Earp

=== Newton Earp ===
Newton married Nancy Jane (Jennie) Adam sometime between 1865 and 1868. They had five children.

=== James Earp ===
James Cooksey Earp enlisted in the Union Army at the outbreak of the American Civil War. He was wounded on October 31, 1861, in a battle near Fredericktown, Missouri, and lost the use of his left arm. He was discharged in March, 1863. Newton and Virgil served until the end of the war. He married former prostitute Nellie "Bessie" Ketchum, in April 1873. He served briefly as a deputy marshal in Dodge City, Kansas, under Marshal Charlie Bassett. On December 1, 1879, he and Nellie joined his brothers Wyatt and Virgil and their wives in Tombstone in the Arizona Territory. He was not present at the Gunfight at the O.K. Corral on October 26, 1881.

On December 28, 1881, his brother Virgil Earp was ambushed and gravely wounded. He survived but lost use of his left arm. On March 18, 1882, his brother Morgan Earp was assassinated in a billiard parlor. James accompanied Morgan's body to the family home in Colton, California.

James then lived for a short time in Shoshone County, Idaho, until settling permanently by 1890 in California. James Earp died of natural causes in San Bernardino, California, on January 25, 1926. He is interred there at the Mountain View Cemetery.

=== Virgil Earp ===
Virgil eloped at age sixteen with 16-year-old Dutch immigrant Magdalena C. "Ellen" Rysdam (born November 25, 1842, in Utrecht, Netherlands – died May 3, 1910, in Cornelius, Oregon). They remained together for a year in spite of her parents' (Gerrit Rysdam and Magdalena Catrina Van Velzen) disapproval of her choice. Their daughter Nellie was born two weeks before Virgil enlisted to serve with the Union forces in the Civil War. During the war, her father told Ellen that Virgil had been killed. She remarried a Dutch man and moved to the Oregon Territory.

Virgil was discharged from the military on June 26, 1865, and returned to Iowa, but he could not locate Ellen. Five years later, he married Rosella Dragoo (b. January 3, 1845, France) on August 28, 1870, in Lamar, Missouri. His father, Justice of the Peace Nicholas Earp, married them. There are no further records of Rosella or their marriage. Virgil later met Alvira "Allie" Sullivan from Florence, Nebraska, in 1874. They were never married but remained together the remainder of his life.

On November 27, 1879, U.S. Marshal Crawley Dake appointed Virgil as Deputy U.S. Marshal for the eastern portion of Pima County. He was instructed by Dake to move to Tombstone to help resolve ongoing problems with outlaw Cowboys. But the job didn't pay much. He was mostly on call helping county and city officials.

On October 30, 1880, after town marshal Fred White was accidentally shot and killed by outlaw and gunman "Curly Bill" Brocius, Virgil was for a while both Tombstone town marshal and Deputy U.S. Marshal. While holding these two offices Virgil, his brothers Wyatt and Morgan, and Doc Holliday confronted the Cowboys in a narrow lot on Fremont Street. Virgil was not expecting a fight. He later testified that when he saw the Cowboys, he immediately commanded them to "Throw up your hands, I want your guns!" But general shooting broke out almost immediately. Witnesses were conflicted about who fired first. During the gunfight, Billy Clanton and both McLaury brothers were killed. Virgil was shot through the calf (he thought by Billy Clanton). Three days after the O.K. Corral gunfight, the city council suspended Virgil as city marshal pending outcome of the preliminary hearing. Virgil was eventually exonerated of wrongdoing, but his reputation suffered thereafter.

On December 28, 1881, three men hidden in the upper story of an unfinished building across Allen street from the hotel ambushed Virgil from behind as he walked from the Oriental Saloon to his room. Virgil was hit in the back and left arm by three loads of double-barreled buckshot from about 60 feet (18 m). He was seriously wounded and Dr. George E. Goodfellow was forced to remove 4 inches (100 mm) of shattered humerus bone from Virgil's left arm, leaving his arm permanently crippled.

In 1898 Virgil was startled to receive a letter from a Mrs. Levi Law, who turned out to be his long-lost daughter who had disappeared with her mother while Virgil fought in the Civil War. He visited her and his first wife in Portland, Oregon, in 1898.

=== Wyatt Earp ===
Wyatt Berry Stapp Earp was married three times. His first wife died less than a year after they were married while carrying their first child. Wyatt held a variety of jobs during his life. He was a gambler, lawman, buffalo hunter, saloon keeper, gold/copper miner, and boxing referee. Local constables in Peoria, Illinois, likely considered him to be a pimp as they arrested him three times during 1872 for being found in a brothel. He arrived with his brothers Virgil and Morgan in Tombstone, Arizona Territory on December 1, 1879. They became embroiled in a conflict with outlaw Cowboys that led to a confrontation and shootout on October 26, 1881, later known as the Gunfight at the O.K. Corral.

Wyatt developed a reputation as a sportsman as well as a gambler. Wyatt was dismayed about the controversy that continually followed him. He wrote a letter to John Hays Hammond on May 21, 1925, telling him "notoriety had been the bane of my life".

=== Morgan Earp ===
Morgan Seth Earp joined his brothers Virgil and Wyatt in Tombstone, Arizona Territory on December 1, 1879. He became embroiled in the conflict between the Earp lawmen and a loose federation of outlaw Cowboys. He took part in the Gunfight at the O.K. Corral and was wounded. He was charged by Ike Clanton with murder, but during a month-long preliminary hearing, Judge Wells Spicer ruled that they had acted within the law and dismissed the charges.

Late Saturday night, March 18, 1882, Morgan was ambushed and killed after returning from a musical at Schieffelin Hall. He was playing a late round of billiards at the Campbell & Hatch Billiard Parlor against owner Bob Hatch. He and the other Earp brothers had received death threats earlier in the day. The assailant shot Morgan through a window in a door that opened onto an alley between Allen and Fremont Streets. Morgan was struck in the right side and the bullet shattered his spine, passed through his left side, and lodged in the thigh of mining foreman George A.B. Berry. He died within the hour.

=== Adelia Earp ===
Adelia married William Thomas Edwards in Rice County, Kansas, in 1877. William Edwards died on May 3, 1919, in San Bernardino County, California. Adelia and William had three children:

- Nicholas Edwards
- Estelle Josphine Edwards
- Mary Virginia Edwards (c. 1880 – 1935).
