= Aetnaville =

Aetnaville may refer to:

- Aetnaville Bridge, a bridge connecting Bridgeport, Ohio to Wheeling, West Virginia
- Aetnaville, Kentucky, a community in Ohio County, Kentucky
