= Cofman (surname) =

Cofman is a surname. Notable people with the surname include:

- Judita Cofman (1936–2001), Yugoslav-German mathematician
- Tamara Cofman Wittes (born Tamara Cofman in 1969), American writer and public figure

== See also ==
- Coffman
