= WEKV (FM) =

K-Love radio station in Central City, Kentucky

- Central City, Kentucky; United States
- Broadcast area: Owensboro, Kentucky; Evansville, Indiana; Madisonville, Kentucky; Bowling Green, Kentucky
- Frequency: 101.9 MHz
- Branding: K-Love

Programming
- Format: Christian adult contemporary
- Network: K-Love

Ownership
- Owner: Educational Media Foundation

History
- First air date: December 18, 1956; 69 years ago
- Former call signs: WNES-FM (1955–1981); WKYA (1981–1993); WQXQ (1993–2020)

Technical information
- Licensing authority: FCC
- Facility ID: 46945
- Class: C1
- ERP: 100 kW
- HAAT: 204 metres (669 ft)
- Transmitter coordinates: 37°35′03″N 86°59′29″W

Links
- Public license information: Public file; LMS

WEKV (101.9 FM) is a K-Love owned-and-operated radio station that is licensed to Central City, Kentucky, United States. The station serves the Central City, Owensboro, Kentucky, and Evansville, Indiana areas. The station is currently owned by Educational Media Foundation, the owner of the K-Love radio network.

The station's transmitter is located along U.S. Highway 231 in northwestern Ohio County near Pleasant Ridge, located along the Ohio–Daviess County line.

== History ==
=== The early years as an FM simulcast and first format change ===
On, November 2, 1955, Muhlenberg Broadcasting Company (later Starlight Broadcasting Company, Inc., now Radio Active Media, Inc.), the original owner of WNES-AM, was granted a construction permit by the FCC to launch an FM radio service. Over a year later, the station signed on the air as WNES-FM on December 18, 1956. From the beginning and throughout the station's ownership with Muhlenberg Broadcasting Company and its successors, the station has maintained shared facilities with WNES-AM and the Greenville Leader-News newspaper, located on Everly Brothers Boulevard (U.S. Highway 62) on the west side of Central City. For WNES-FM's first 24 years and four months on the air, it was as a simulcast of its AM sister station. This ended on April 23, 1980, when the station became a separate entity and started broadcasting an easy listening format.

=== First Hot AC attempt and Country format (1981–1993) ===
On December 1, 1981, the station increased its transmitter power to 50,000 watts, and switched to a Hot AC format and changed the call letters to WKYA. The radio station employed local radio talent during this period and experienced a great deal of success. However, head-to-head competition with "Hot AC" giant WSTO, based at that time in Owensboro, took its toll on the station. After a slow down in listenership and sales, "KY-102" ceased to exist and it changed its format to country music sometime during the 1989–90 winter season. From that point on, it called itself "K-Country KY-102". This was successful for a period of time until another Owensboro station, in this case being WBKR, clamped down on the market by increasing the effective radiated power on their transmitter in southern Daviess County near the community of Utica.

=== New Hot AC era and increased power (1993–2013) ===
On February 23, 1993, WKYA discontinued their country format and changed the call letters to WQXQ. Along with the new callsign, the station built a new transmission tower in northwestern Ohio County near Pleasant Ridge; its signal was previously broadcast from the WNES transmission tower at the studio. Once the station began broadcasting on the new tower, it returned to its previous "Hot AC" style format; this time featuring a local talent in the mornings only and then satellite powered broadcast for the rest of the day. The new format and the new tower also came with the increase of power to 100,000 watts for the purpose to have the station focus on the Owensboro area but still serve their original broadcast area. In 1996, the WKYA callsign was reassigned to its Greenville-licensed sister station, a country (now Oldies) station broadcasting at 105.5 MHz, which also shared studios with WNES and WQXQ since that station's 1981 sign-on.

After being branded as "Q-101.9 FM" for a time during the mid and late-2000s, the station's branding changed to "Q-102" around 2011, and the format was changed to a CHR/Top 40 format, which mostly included new music.

=== Sports format (2013–2020) ===
The Top 40 format lasted for only two years on WQXQ as it renewed the rivalry with the now-Evansville-based WSTO. In October 2013, WQXQ switched to a sports radio format after becoming an automated affiliate of Fox Sports Radio, bringing that format to the area. During its tenure as a Fox Sports Radio affiliated station, the station also broadcast University of Louisville football and men's basketball games from the U of L Sports Network from 2014 to 2020.

=== Sale to Educational Media Foundation and current format (2020–present) ===
On July 22, 2020, after more than 63 ½ years under locally based ownership, Radio Active Media sold WQXQ to Educational Media Foundation for $617,000; the sale was approved on September 25, 2020. Four days later, the new owners changed the station's call letters to the current WEKV and changed its programming to broadcast its current Christian adult contemporary format in the company-owned K-Love radio network. This change proved to be unpopular with much of the former WQXQ listening audience.

== Call letter history ==
The station's previous call letters WQXQ were previously assigned to an FM station in New York City in the 1940s. It was a sister station to WQXR (now WFME), operating on 96.3 MHz.

== Coverage area ==
With its 100,000 watt signal coverage from a tower 669 feet in height above average terrain, the station can be heard about 80 miles away in every direction from the tower site in northern Ohio County. The coverage area includes much of the Western Coal Field and Pennyrile regions of western and west-central Kentucky, and much of southern Indiana. The signal reaches several areas within the signal range, including all three major cities in the Evansville Tri-state area, and can reach as far east as the Elizabethtown/Fort Knox area, the Mammoth Cave National Park area, and some of the far western suburbs of the metro Louisville area. It can also reach as far south as a few areas in Montgomery and Robertson Counties in Tennessee, as far north as an area halfway between Evansville and Bloomington, Indiana, and as far west as Gallatin and Hardin Counties in Illinois and Crittenden County, Kentucky.
