= Dundee, Kentucky =

Unincorporated community in Kentucky, United States

- Unincorporated community
- Location within Kentucky
- Coordinates: 37°33′32″N 86°46′22″W
- Country: United States
- State: Kentucky
- County: Ohio
- Elevation: 423 ft (129 m)
- Time zone: UTC-6 (Central (CST))
  - Summer (DST): UTC-5 (CDT)
- ZIP code: 42338
- Area code: 270
- GNIS feature ID: 491311

Dundee is an unincorporated community in Ohio County in the U.S. state of Kentucky. Dundee is located on Kentucky Route 69, 10.5 miles (16.9 km) northeast of Hartford and 6.4 miles (10.3 km) southwest of Fordsville.

== Climate ==
The climate in this area is characterized by hot, humid summers and generally mild to cool winters. According to the Köppen Climate Classification system, Dundee has a humid subtropical climate, abbreviated "Cfa" on climate maps.
