= Old Town Historic District (Hartford, Kentucky) =

Historic district in Kentucky, United States

- U.S. National Register of Historic Places
- U.S. Historic district
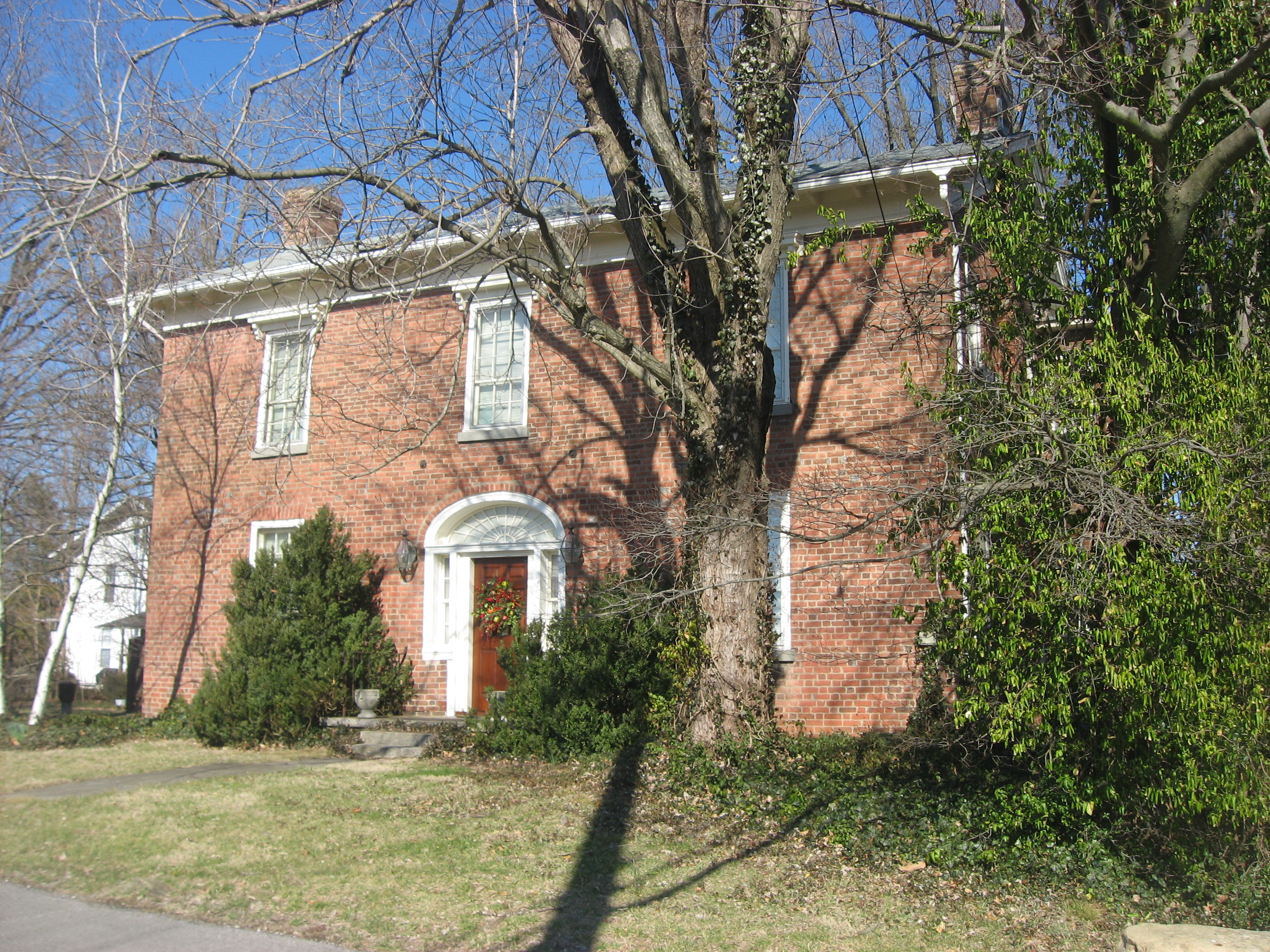

- Location within Kentucky Location within the United States
- Location: Roughly bounded by E. Union, Clay, E. Washington and Liberty Sts., Hartford, Kentucky
- Coordinates: 37°27′08″N 86°54′24″W
- Area: 6 acres (2.4 ha)
- Architectural style: Late 19th And Early 20th Century American Movements, Late Victorian, Greek Revival
- NRHP reference No.: 88002535
- Added to NRHP: November 15, 1988

The Old Town Historic District in Hartford, Kentucky is a historic district which was listed on the National Register of Historic Places in 1988.

The 6 acres (2.4 ha) listed area included 17 contributing buildings and a contributing structure.

The district is roughly bounded by E. Union, Clay, E. Washington and Liberty Streets. It includes the Hartford Seminary, which is separately listed on the National Register.
