= Equality, Kentucky =

Unincorporated community in Kentucky, United States

Coordinates: 37°23′45″N 87°03′57″W

Equality is an unincorporated community in Ohio County, Kentucky, southwest of Centertown. Close to coal mines and the Green River, it is a coal-mining settlement.

== Area ==
The area of Equality stands on a peninsula-like area around the Green River. North of the community is Matanzas and south of it is Ceralvo. The western side of the community is in South Carrolton. There are coal mines also west of the area.

== Location ==
The town stands on KY 69 with other well-known roads like Sheffield Lane, Smallhouse Lane, and Matanzas Road.
