= WAIA (AM) =

Radio station in Beaver Dam, Kentucky (1969–2012)

- Beaver Dam, Kentucky; United States
- Frequency: 1600 kHz

Ownership
- Owner: Starlight Broadcasting Co., Inc.

History
- First air date: June 21, 1969
- Last air date: June 26, 2012
- Former call signs: WLLS (1969–1996); WSNR (1996–2001); WAIA (2001–2012)

Technical information
- Facility ID: 26493
- Class: D
- Power: 1,000 watts day; 68 watts night
- Transmitter coordinates: 37°26′36″N 86°53′57″W

WAIA (1600 AM) was a radio station formerly licensed to Beaver Dam, Kentucky, United States. The station was owned by Starlight Broadcasting Co., Inc.

== History ==
The station originally signed on as daytime-only WLLS on June 21, 1969. The station began operation under ownership by local businessman Hayward Spinks. Two years later, the station signed on its FM companion, WLLS-FM (now WXMZ) in order to provide nighttime service and a better quality signal to the listeners.

The station changed its callsign to WSNR on October 1, 1996. On March 26, 2001, the station changed its callsign again to WAIA.

Starlight Broadcasting surrendered the station's license to the Federal Communications Commission (FCC) on June 26, 2012. The station's license was cancelled and its call sign deleted from the FCC's database on July 19, 2012.

Before permanently signing off, both WAIA and WXMZ served as a simulcast of WKYA of Greenville. In 2012, after WAIA went off the air, WXMZ began broadcasting its own station programming, and it, too, began running an oldies format, and moved to a frequency of 99.9 MHz.
