= Deanefield, Kentucky =

Unincorporated community in Kentucky, United States

Deanefield
- Unincorporated community
- Location within the state of Kentucky Deanefield (the United States)
- Coordinates: 37°39′34″N 86°48′25″W
- Country: United States
- State: Kentucky
- County: Ohio
- Elevation: 453 ft (138 m)
- Time zone: UTC-6 (Central (CST))
  - Summer (DST): UTC-5 (CDT)
- GNIS feature ID: 507827

Deanefield is an unincorporated community and coal town located in Ohio County, Kentucky, United States.

The Deanefield post office was originally known as Aetnaville, before the name was changed to Deanefield in 1910.
