= Newton Earp =

American Old West pioneer and soldier (1837–1928)

Newton Jasper Earp
- Born: October 7, 1837; Ohio County, Kentucky, U.S
- Died: December 18, 1928 (aged 91); Sacramento, California, U.S.
- Resting place: East Lawn Memorial Park Cemetery
- Occupations: Farmer; soldier; carpenter
- Spouse: Nancy Jane Adam (m. 1865; died 1898)
- Children: 5
- Parents: Nicholas Porter Earp; Abigail Storm
- Relatives: James Earp (brother); Virgil Earp (brother); Wyatt Earp (brother); Morgan Earp (brother); Warren Earp (brother)
- Military service
- Allegiance: United States
- Branch: United States Army
- Service years: 1861–1865
- Rank: 4th Sergeant
- Unit: 4th Iowa Cavalry
- Conflicts: See list: American Civil War; Siege of Vicksburg; Battle of Brice's Crossroads; Battle of Little Blue River; Second Battle of Independence; Battle of Byram's Ford; Battle of Westport; Battle of Marais des Cygnes; Battle of Mine Creek; Battle of Marmiton River; Battle of Egypt Station; Battle of Selma

Newton Jasper Earp (October 7, 1837 – December 18, 1928) was an American pioneer born in Kentucky in 1837.

He was the eldest child of Nicholas Porter Earp and Abigail Storm. He was the half-brother of Old West lawmen Wyatt, Virgil, and Morgan Earp.

He was in the Union army during the Civil War, serving as a part of the 4th Iowa Cavalry, and eventually mustered out with the rank of corporal. Departing the army in 1865 he went to Missouri to farm on the land of his father near Lamar, then lost an election for constable five years later at Lamar. In 1871 he moved to Kansas, near the town of Stearling, Rice County where he was a farmer and pioneer settler, and thence to Garden City, in which town he rose quickly, becoming marshal for some time. He was said to have hunted buffalo in 1873 near Peace, Kansas. He had also migrated to Wyoming and Nevada, probably settling in the towns of Casper and Paradise before moving to California. Newton was a Mason and died in 1928.

== Early life ==
Newton was born in Ohio County, Kentucky, to Nicholas Earp and his first wife, Abigail Storm. His mother died when he was two. Newton Earp and half-brothers James and Virgil were close for their entire lives. He ran against his younger half-brother Wyatt for the office of constable. The Earps may have hoped to keep the job in the family one way or another. Wyatt won by 137 votes to Newton's 108, but their father Nicholas lost the election for justice of the peace in a very close four-way race.

== Civil War ==
Following the outbreak of the Civil War, Earp enlisted in the Union Army (along with both James and Virgil) in 1861. His brother James, fighting in the 17th Illinois Infantry Regiment, suffered a serious shoulder wound at the Engagement at Fredericktown, in October 1861, and returned home early. Virgil and Newton, however, served the entire war.

Newton Earp served with Company F of the Fourth Cavalry, Iowa Volunteers. He was promoted to fourth sergeant on January 1, 1865.

Newton mustered out of the Army on June 26, 1865, in Louisville, Kentucky.

== Post-Civil War ==
After Earp's return from the American Civil War, he married Nancy Jane "Jennie" Adam in Marion County, Missouri on 12 Sep 1865. The newlyweds then joined his father and siblings in San Bernardino, California in southern California, where most of the family had relocated. There, Newton worked as a saloon manager.

Earp and family returned to the Midwest in 1868, first settling in Lamar, Missouri, where Earp took up farming. The family later relocated to Kansas. The Earps had five children: Effie May, Wyatt Clyde, Mary Elizabeth, Alice Abigail, and Virgil Edwin. They named their first-born son (born August 25, 1872) after his not-yet-famous younger brother, Wyatt; and their second son (born April 19, 1880) after his younger brother, Virgil.

== Later life and death ==
Following another relocation to California, Newton became a carpenter, building homes in northern California and northwestern Nevada. Earp's wife Jennie died on March 29, 1898, in Paradise Hill, Nevada, also known as Paradise Valley. Newton died at age 91 in Sacramento, California on December 18, 1928. Only his brother Wyatt and sister Adelia survived him, with Wyatt dying almost a month later on January 13, 1929. He is buried in Sacramento's East Lawn Memorial Park Cemetery.
