= Pleasant Ridge, Kentucky =

Census-designated place in Kentucky, United States

- Census-designated place
- Location within Kentucky Location within the United States
- Coordinates: 37°35′52″N 86°59′14″W
- Country: United States
- State: Kentucky
- Counties: Daviess; Ohio

Area
  - Total: 3.55 sq mi (9.20 km^{2})
  - Land: 3.51 sq mi (9.09 km^{2})
  - Water: 0.042 sq mi (0.11 km^{2})
- Elevation: 522 ft (159 m)

Population (2020)
  - Total: 578
  - Density: 164.7/sq mi (63.58/km^{2})
- Time zone: UTC-6 (Central (CST))
  - Summer (DST): UTC-5 (CDT)
- ZIP Codes: 42376 (Utica); 42378 (Whitesville)
- Area codes: 270 & 364
- FIPS code: 21-61680
- GNIS feature ID: 2806543

Pleasant Ridge is an unincorporated community and census-designated place (CDP) in Daviess and Ohio counties, Kentucky, United States. The population was 578 as of the 2020 census.

== Geography ==
It is in the southeastern part of Daviess County and the northwestern part of Ohio County, 14 miles (23 km) southeast of Owensboro and 11 miles (18 km) northwest of Hartford. U.S. Route 231 passes through the community, connecting the two cities. The small town of Pleasant Ridge, Kentucky is located just outside of Alexandria and is home to around 4,700 people. Although it is a small town, Pleasant Ridge has a big personality.

== Agriculture ==
Originally settled in the late 1700s, Pleasant Ridge was the center of a bustling agricultural community and has since become known for its peaceful atmosphere, laid back lifestyle, and beautiful landscape. Much of the town remains largely unchanged in its appearance, with rows of cozy Victorian-style homes and a large green belt that winds through the middle of the area.

The town's primary industry is agriculture, and it still produces a variety of crops such as corn, soybeans, wheat, hay, and fruits, as well as livestock and poultry. Pleasant Ridge is also an important center for local milk production, with two large dairy farms located nearby. Additionally, many residents of Pleasant Ridge are employed by the nearby airport and the numerous surrounding industries.

Historical population
Census	Pop.	Note	%±
2020	578		—
U.S. Decennial Census
