= Coffman =

Coffman is a surname. Notable people with the surname include:

- Amber Coffman (born 1984), singer and musician
- Carson Coffman (born 1988), quarterback for the Utah Blaze
- Chase Coffman (born 1986), American footballer for the Tampa Bay Buccaneers
- Cynthia Coffman (murderer) (born 1962), American murderer
- Cynthia Coffman (politician) (born 1961), former Attorney General of Colorado
- Denny Coffman, former Hawaii state Representative
- Edward G. Coffman Jr. (born 1934), American computer scientist
- Edward M. Coffman (1929–2020), American historian and writer
- Elaine Coffman (born 1942), American fiction writer
- James Burton Coffman (1905–2006), American minister, teacher and writer
- Jennifer B. Coffman (born 1948), United States federal judge
- Mike Coffman (born 1955), Mayor of Aurora and former U.S. Representative for Colorado's 6th congressional district
- Paul Coffman (born 1956), American football player for the Green Bay Packers and the Kansas City Chiefs
- Vance D. Coffman (born 1944), chief executive officer and Chairman of Lockheed Martin Corporation

== Other uses ==
- Coffman engine starter, device on an aircraft
- Coffman, Kentucky, unincorporated community, United States
- Coffman, Missouri, unincorporated community, United States
- Dublin Coffman High School, high school in Dublin, Ohio
- USS Coffman (DE-191), Cannon-class destroyer escort
