= Simmons, Kentucky =

Unincorporated community in Kentucky, United States

Simmons
- Unincorporated community
- Location within the state of Kentucky Simmons (the United States)
- Coordinates: 37°21′27″N 86°56′32″W
- Country: United States
- State: Kentucky
- County: Ohio
- Elevation: 443 ft (135 m)
- Time zone: UTC-6 (Central (CST))
  - Summer (DST): UTC-5 (CDT)
- GNIS feature ID: 509062

Simmons is an unincorporated community and coal town located in Ohio County, Kentucky, United States.
