= Archaic Dog Burials in the Midwest United States =

There are many sites within the Midwestern United States. Some of the better known sites are the Koster Site in Illinois, the Green River Valley in Kentucky, Hendricks Cave in Ohio, Indian Knolls and Dravo Gravel.

== Reasons ==
The reasons for these burials are often discussed among Midwest Archaeologists. Some of the more well known theories for these burials are that the dogs were healers or had healing properties, the dogs were possible substitutes for humans, some even go to say that these dogs could have been adopted humans, work animals such as pack dogs or that these dogs served as a guide and judge to the deceased they were buried with. One trend that was seen during the Middle Archaic period mainly was that an individual or individuals that were buried with dogs suffered violent deaths either in war or as punishment for crimes. Another trend that was present during the Archaic was that these dogs were not used for a food source unless in drastic times.

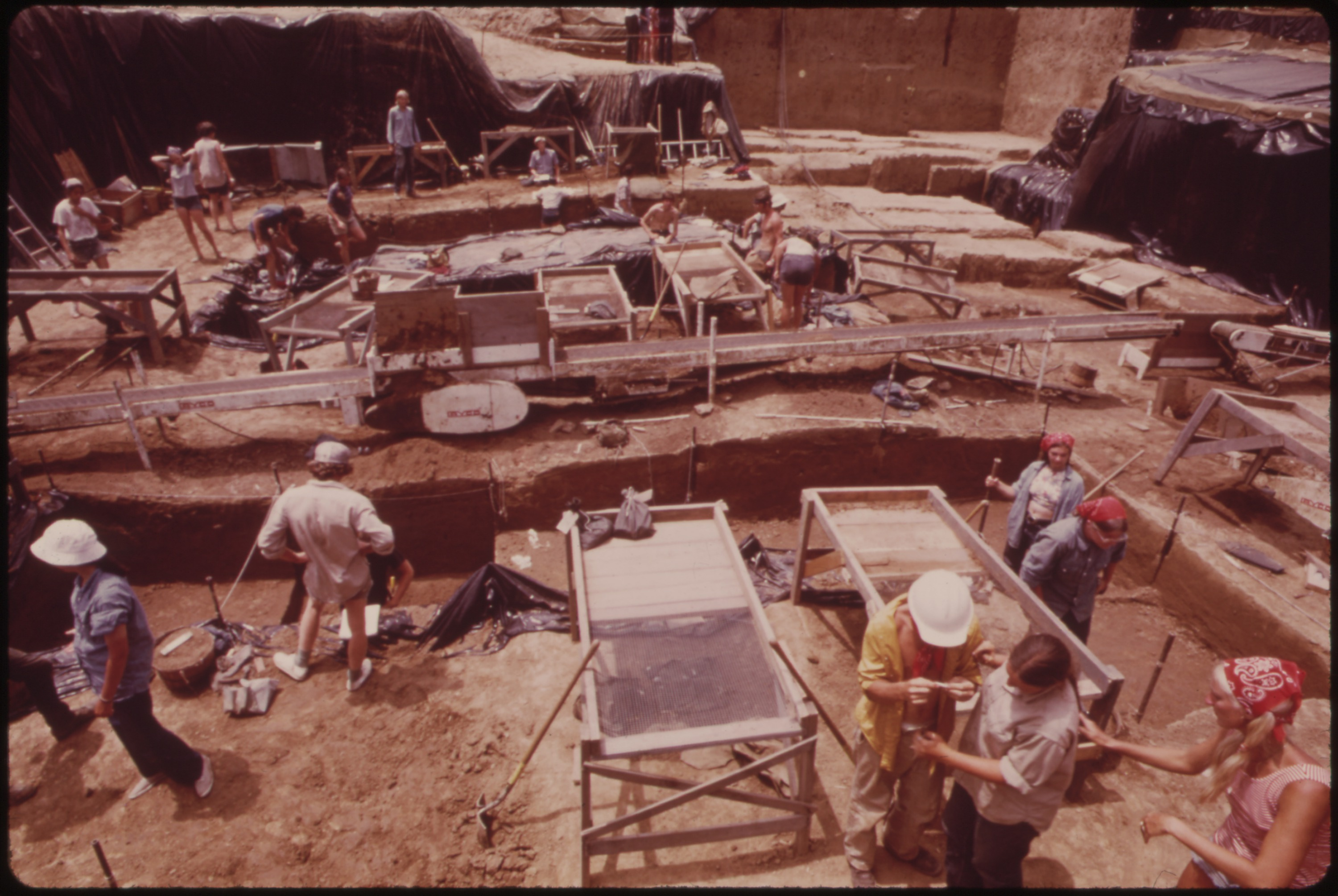
Koster Site excavations

== The Koster Site ==
The Koster site is a site in Illinois that has been occupied many times throughout Midwest prehistory. The first dog burials that were found at this site were dated to one of the occupations during the Early Archaic period. These dog burials were dated to 8500.

== The Green River Valley ==
The Green River Valley had many sites that are a part of this area. Within this area, there are a total of 246 dog burials and 31 of these burials were associated with humans. 51% of the 31 burials were buried in bluff top camps, 41% were buried in shell mounds and the remaining 9% were buried in dirt mounds.
