= Dundee Masonic Lodge No. 733 =

- U.S. National Register of Historic Places
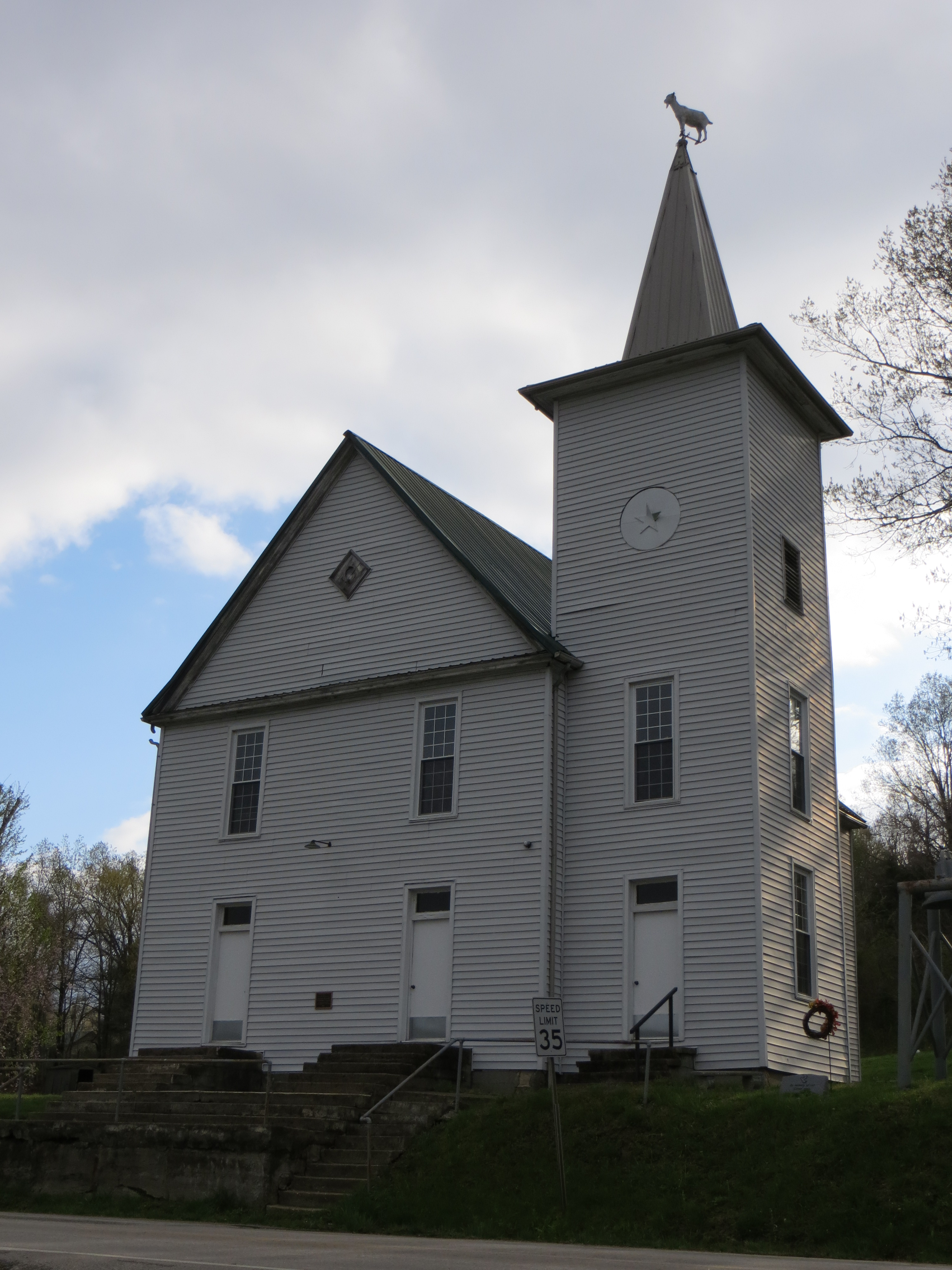
- Building with the goat weathervane

- Location within Kentucky Location within the United States
- Location: 11640 KY 69 N., Dundee, Kentucky
- Coordinates: 37°33′25″N 86°46′22″W
- Area: less than one acre
- Built: 1902
- NRHP reference No.: 08000213
- Added to NRHP: March 25, 2008

Dundee Masonic Lodge No. 733 is a historic building built in 1902. It was listed on the National Register of Historic Places in 2008. The building housed the Masonic lodge group and a Methodist church. The lodge group had 64 registered members in 1920. The U.S. Post Office issued a pictorial postmark for the "Dundee Masonic Lodge No. 733 Station" in 2008. The building is also referred to as the "Goat Building" due to the zinc weathervane goat at the top of the buildings spire.

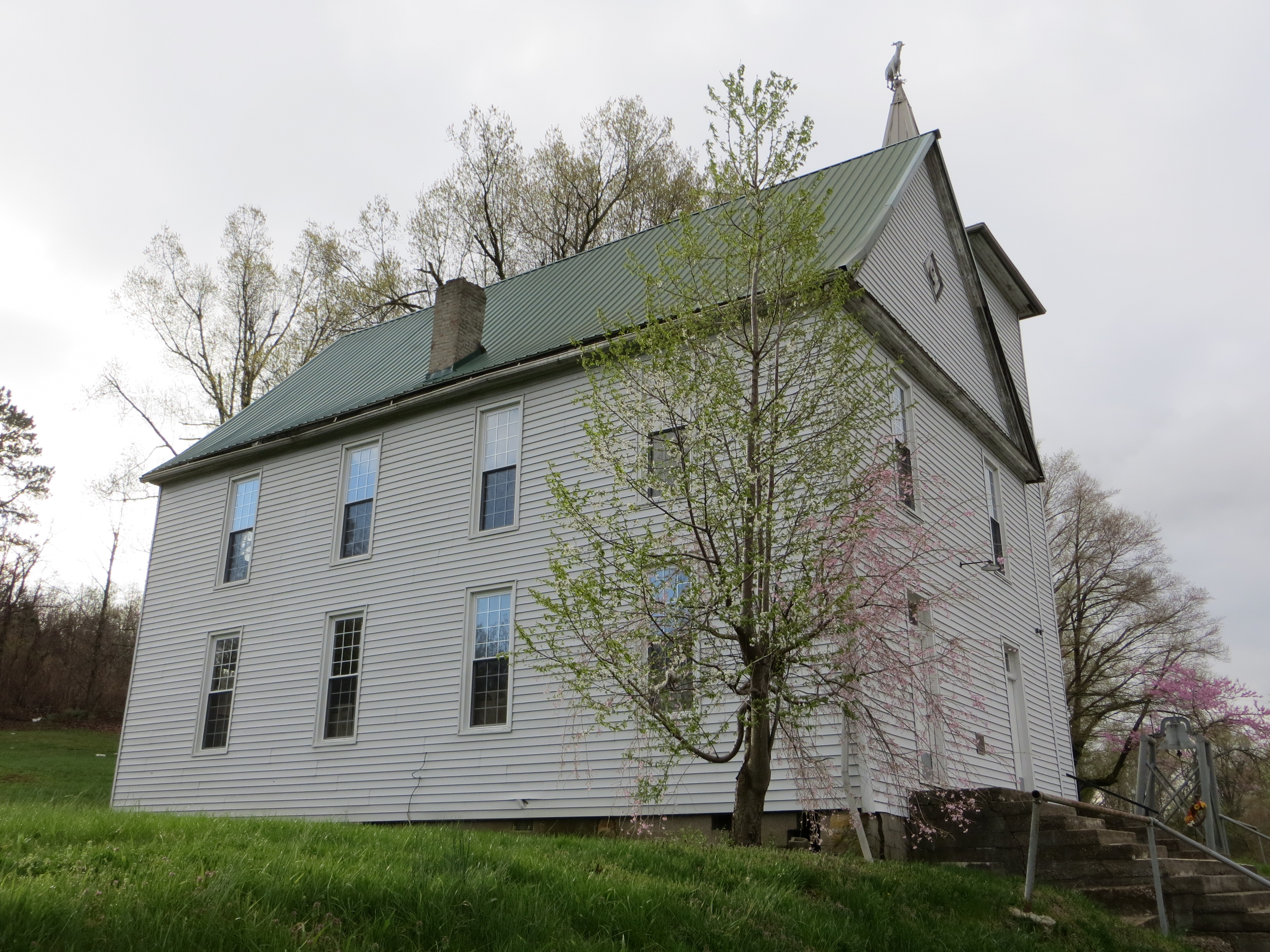
