= Samuel E. Hill House =

- U.S. National Register of Historic Places
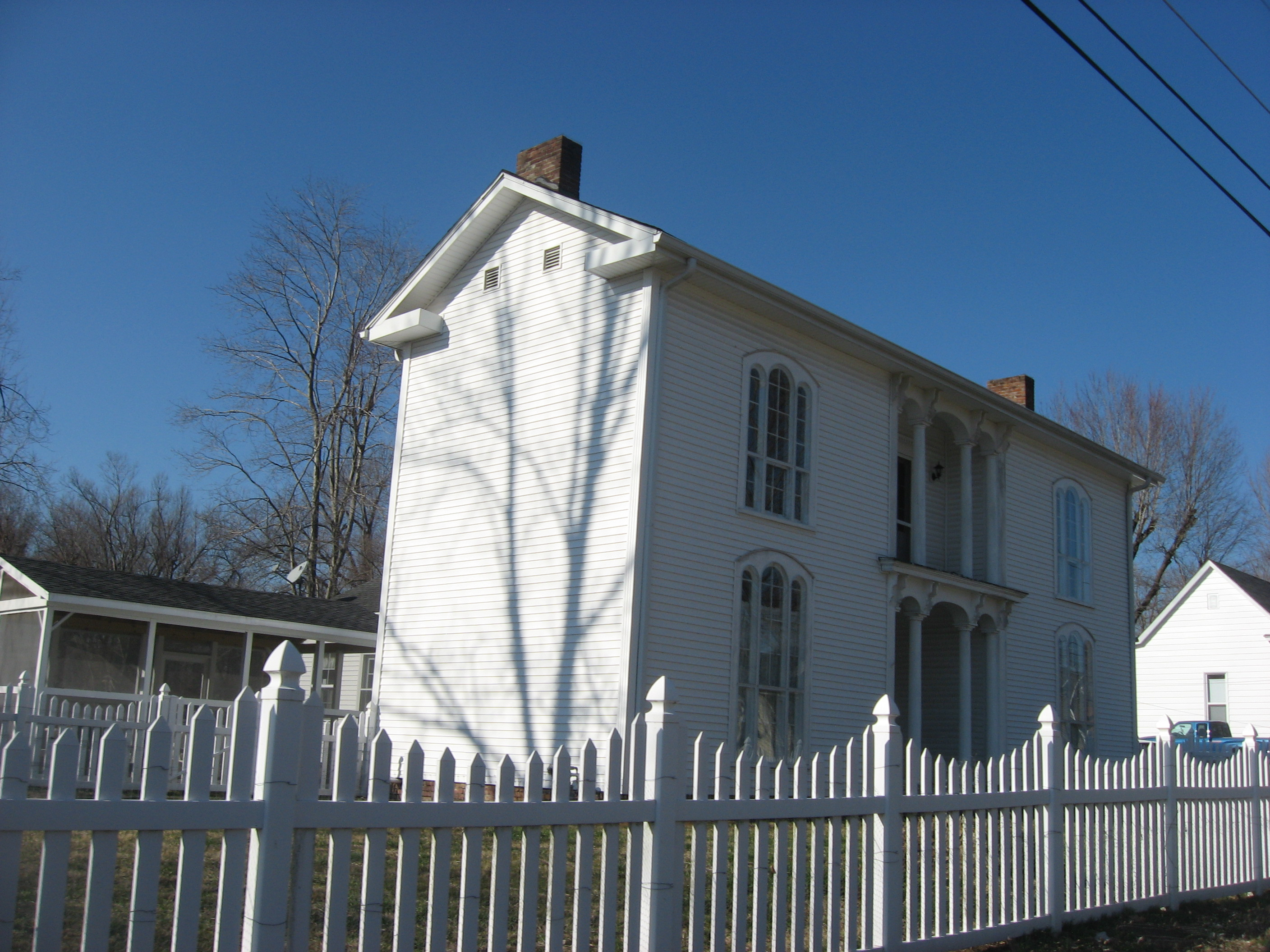
- Location: 519 E. Union St., Hartford, Kentucky
- Coordinates: 37°27′28″N 86°54′16″W
- Area: 1 acre (0.40 ha)
- Built: 1871
- NRHP reference No.: 80001663
- Added to NRHP: May 27, 1980

The Samuel E. Hill House, at 519 E. Union St. in Hartford, Kentucky, was built in 1871. It was listed on the National Register of Historic Places in 1980.

It is a two-story three-bay frame house with interior end chimneys. It has "a recessed entrance porch with round arched openings and slender wooden columns. Brackets decorate the projecting cornice mold on both first and second story porches. A 20th century, one-story ell projects from the rear, addition on the north side."

It was deemed significant for its association with Samuel E. Hill (1844-c.1900), who was a Union military officer from Kentucky during the American Civil War and who also was prominent in law and politics in Kentucky after the war. He was known as the "boy captain" because he achieved that rank just before he was 20 years old.

As can be seen in its photo, it is an I-house.
