= Fordsville station =

- Louisville, Henderson, and St. Louis Railroad Depot
- U.S. National Register of Historic Places
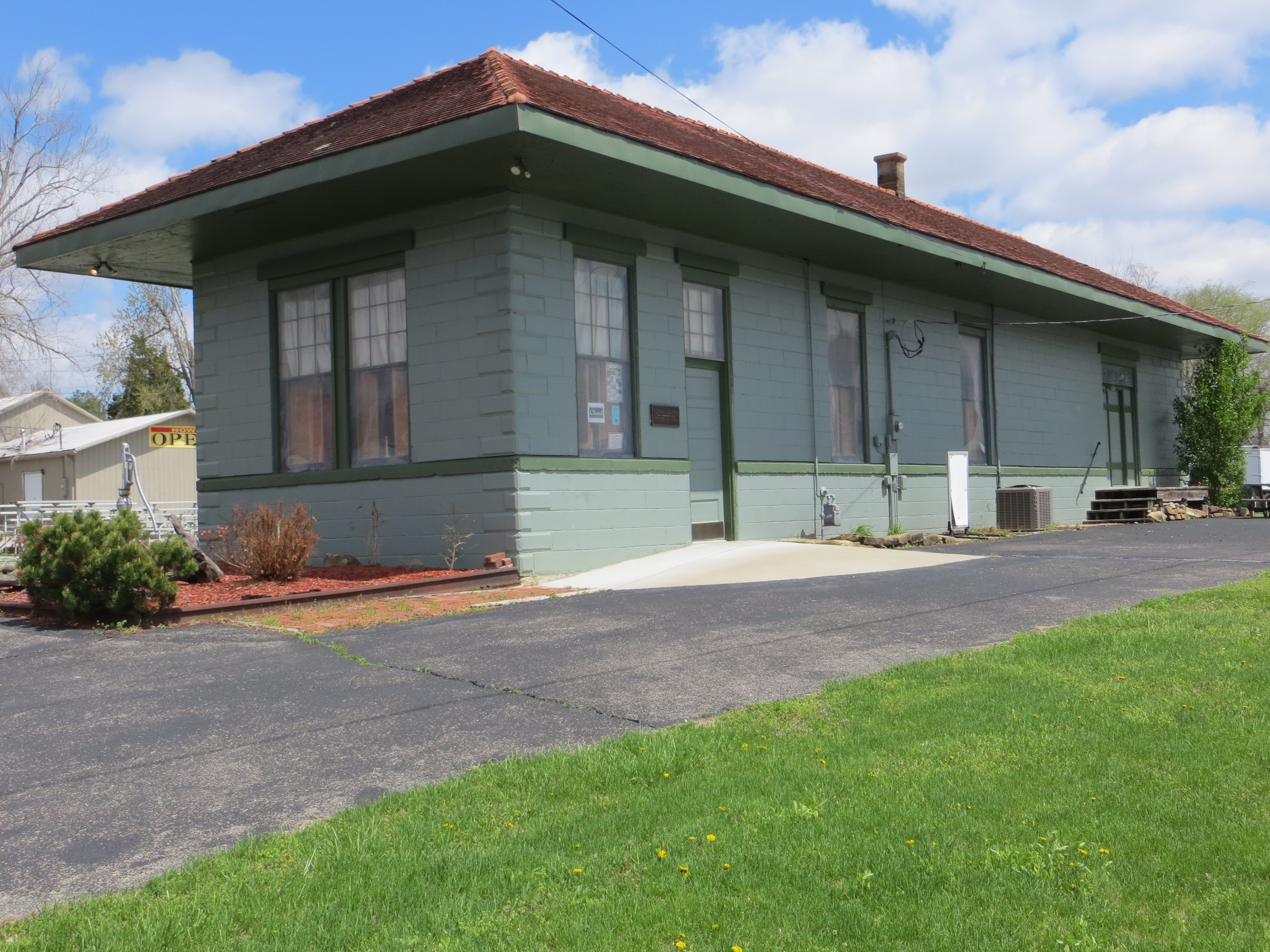

- Location within Kentucky Location within the United States
- Location: SE side Walnut St., 200' N of jct. with KY 54, Fordsville, Kentucky
- Coordinates: 37°38′11″N 86°43′01″W
- Area: 0.3 acres (0.12 ha)
- Built: 1916
- Architectural style: Prairie School
- NRHP reference No.: 91000923
- Added to NRHP: July 26, 1991

The Louisville, Henderson, and St. Louis Railroad Depot in Fordsville, Kentucky was built in 1916. It was listed on the National Register of Historic Places in 1991. It is located on the southeastern side of Walnut St., 200 feet (61 m) north of its junction with Kentucky Route 54.

It "is a long, low, concrete-block, tile-roofed building which relates most closely in style to the Prairie School."

Preceding station	Louisville and Nashville Railroad	Following station
Terminus	Fordsville Branch	Ellmitch Terminus
