= Smallhous, Kentucky =

Unincorporated community in Kentucky, United States

- Unincorporated community
- Location within Kentucky
- Coordinates: 37°22′48″N 87°05′37″W
- Country: United States
- State: Kentucky
- County: Ohio
- Elevation: 397 ft (121 m)
- Time zone: UTC-6 (Central (CST))
  - Summer (DST): UTC-5 (CDT)
- Area code: 270
- GNIS feature ID: 509082

Smallhous is an unincorporated community in Ohio County, Kentucky, United States. Smallhous is located on the Green River 6 miles (9.7 km) west-southwest of Centertown.
