= Pendleton House (Hartford, Kentucky) =

- U.S. National Register of Historic Places
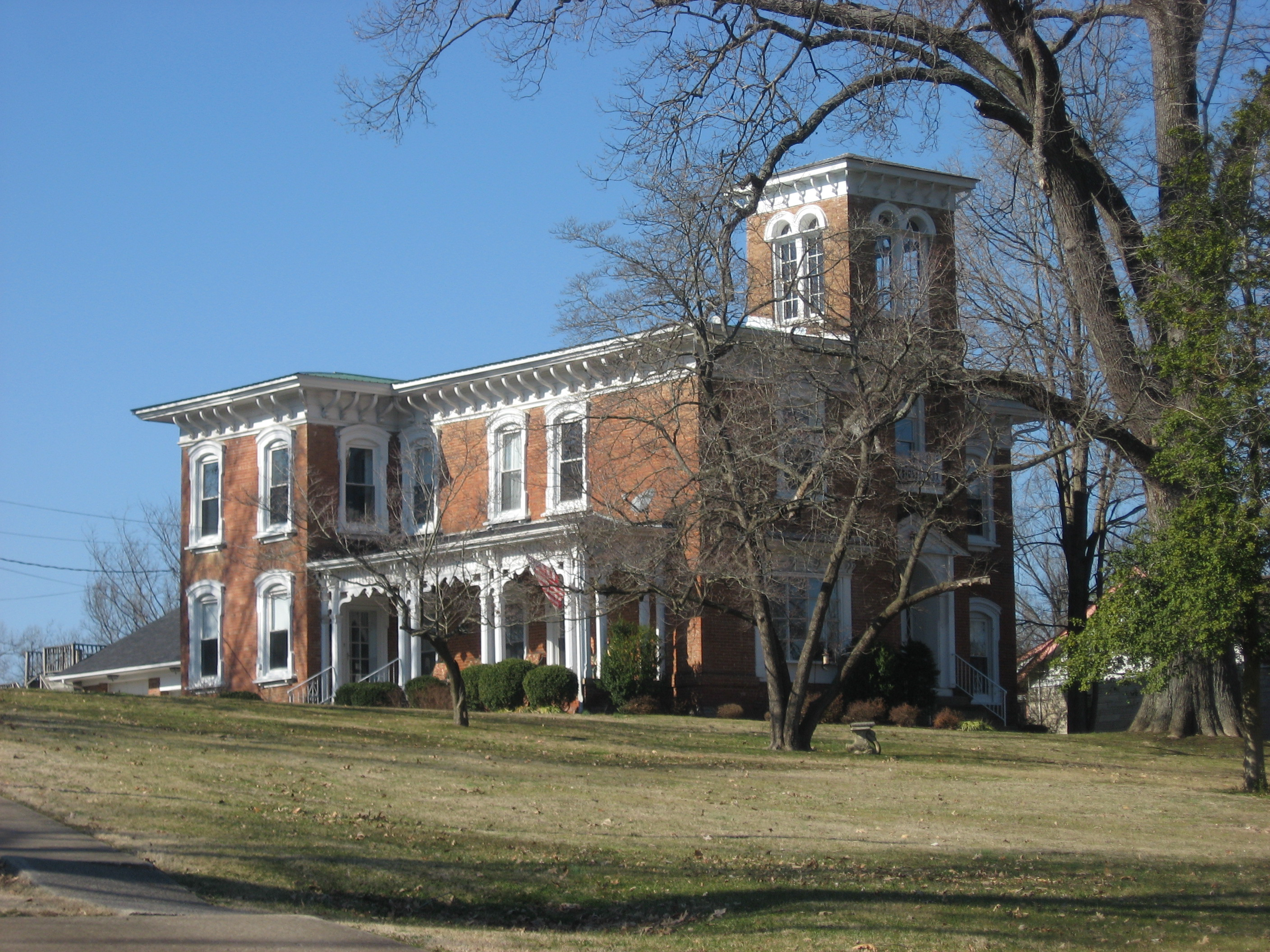

- Location within Kentucky Location within the United States
- Location: 403 E. Union St., Hartford, Kentucky
- Coordinates: 37°27′17″N 86°54′21″W
- Area: 3 acres (1.2 ha)
- Built: 1861-66
- Architectural style: English Manor house
- NRHP reference No.: 73000827
- Added to NRHP: May 17, 1973

The Pendleton House, at 403 E. Union St. in Hartford, Kentucky, was built during 1861–66. It was listed on the National Register of Historic Places in 1973.

It is like an "English Manor house" in style and in being the big house of a rural area. It has also been known as Hillside.

According to its NRHP nomination, "For years it has been the most impressive feature of Hartford's residential landscape. Rising ten feet above the roofline of the thirteen room, two story-brick building is an interesting_ square tower that was used as an artist's studio by Pendleton's second wife. A brick criss-cross pattern walkway, bordered by sand flagstone, extends from the front entrance down the spacious lawn to a fountain. Elegant "S"shaped supports surround the exterior of the overhanging roof of both the house and the tower. The roof of the side porch is supported by unusual semi-circular rafters and eight columns. The gingerbread trim adorning the roofline is an acorn and oak leaf pattern. Ornamental iron railings were added later. The original tin roofing was also replaced in 1965."

It was home of Dr. John E. Pendleton, who started to build the house in 1861, but halted construction, storing mahogany and cherry wood within the partly completed house. He "raised a company of soldiers in Ohio and Muhlenburg Counties and entered the Confederate service as their captain in the Ninth Regiment of the First Kentucky Brigade, in the fall of 1861. He was soon promoted to surgeon of the regiment and served successively as surgeon of the brigade, and chief surgeon of General John C. Breckinridge's command. When General Breckinridge became Secretary of War, Dr. Pendleton was placed with General William T. Martin's division and was shortly afterward appointed medical advisor in Lieutenant General Wheeler's Corps where he remained until the close of the war. He was with Wheeler in Sherman's march to the sea. He surrendered at Charlottesville, N.C. with the regiment in 1865." He then returned and completed the house
