= WNES =

- Central City, Kentucky; United States
- Frequency: 1050 kHz
- Branding: K-Country

Programming
- Format: Classic Country

Ownership
- Owner: Radio Active Media, Inc.
- Sister stations: WKYA

History
- First air date: January 1955; 71 years ago
- Former frequencies: 1600 kHz (1955–1960)

Technical information
- Licensing authority: FCC
- Facility ID: 46946
- Class: D
- Power: 1,000 watts day 172 watts night
- Transmitter coordinates: 37°16′9″N 87°8′32″W
- Repeater: W284AO (104.7 FM) Central City

Links
- Public license information: Public file; LMS

WNES (1050 AM) is a classic country-formatted radio station that is licensed to and located in Central City, Kentucky, United States. The station is currently owned by Starlight Broadcasting Co., Inc.

The station's studio (shared with sister station WKYA) and transmitter is located on Everly Brothers Boulevard (U.S. Highway 62) near the Western Kentucky Parkway underpass southwest of Central City.

== History ==
On September 8, 1954, Muhlenberg Broadcasting Company was granted a construction permit by the FCC. The station began broadcasting on January 1, 1955, as the first radio station to broadcast in Muhlenberg County, Kentucky. The station was a 500 watt daytime-only station broadcasting at 1600 kilocycles. In December 1956, the station launched its FM companion, WNES-FM (101.9 FM, now WEKV), and would simulcast its AM programming on that station until 1980, when the FM became a separate entity. WNES reallocated to its current frequency of 1050 kilocycles in August 1960.

In March 2013, the station's owner, Starlight Broadcasting, was renamed Radio Active Media, Inc. The station's programming was simulcast on the FM dial via WNES-FM (now WEKV) from that station's 1956 inception until December 1981. In September 2014, the FM simulcast of WNES returned when the station launched a Class D low-power FM translator, W284AO, broadcasting a frequency of 104.7 megahertz with 250 watts of power.

== Coverage area ==
The station's daytime signal covers Muhlenberg and surrounding counties, plus the Owensboro and Henderson area. Its nighttime signal coverage is greatly reduced to avoid co-frequency interference with other AM 1050 stations. W284AO's signal covers all of Muhlenberg County, along with portions of its neighboring counties.
