= Coffman, Kentucky =

Unincorporated community in Kentucky, US

Coffman
- Unincorporated community
- Location within the state of Kentucky Coffman (the United States)
- Coordinates: 37°27′47″N 87°6′7″W
- Country: United States
- State: Kentucky
- County: Ohio
- Elevation: 417 ft (127 m)
- Time zone: UTC-6 (Central (CST))
  - Summer (DST): UTC-5 (CDT)
- GNIS feature ID: 507725

Coffman is an unincorporated community and coal town located in Ohio County, Kentucky, United States. It was also known as Jimtown. Founded in 1905 by Franklin Olliver Coffman, it included a post office, school, and general store. Mining ceased in 1911 when cheaper shallow strip mining in Indiana began operations. The current population is estimated as 2 as of 2020.

The D.B Wilson Generating Station is approximately 1.63 miles (2.63 kilometers) away from Coffman.
