= WXMZ =

Oldies radio station in Hartford, Kentucky

- Hartford, Kentucky; United States
- Broadcast area: Hartford/Beaver Dam, Kentucky; Owensboro, Kentucky; Morgantown; Central City/Greenville, Kentucky
- Frequency: 99.9 MHz
- Branding: The Z 99.9

Programming
- Language: English
- Format: Oldies
- Affiliations: Westwood One

Ownership
- Owner: Wright Time Broadcasting

History
- First air date: May 18, 1972; 54 years ago
- Former call signs: WLLS-FM (1972–1996); WKHB (1996–1999)
- Former frequencies: 106.3 MHz (1972–2012)

Technical information
- Licensing authority: FCC
- Facility ID: 26494
- Class: A
- ERP: 6,000 watts
- HAAT: 328 feet (100 m)
- Transmitter coordinates: 37°26′36″N 86°53′57″W

Links
- Public license information: Public file; LMS

WXMZ (99.9 FM) is an American radio station that is licensed to serve and located in Hartford, Kentucky. The station is owned by Wright Time Broadcasting, and it currently broadcasts an oldies format.

The station's studios are located at 314 South Main Street in downtown Hartford and its transmitter is located along Bald Knob Road off US 231 near Cromwell.

== History ==
Heeding listeners’ calls for nighttime service and a better quality signal on the existing daytime-only WLLS-AM (1600 kHz, later WAIA, now defunct), station owner Hayward Spinks applied for a construction permit to build an FM station for the purpose of simulcasting the station's AM service. Spinks was granted a construction permit from the FCC to build the FM station on May 5, 1971. The station signed on the air on May 18, 1972, as WLLS-FM (Later, jokingly made into the reverse acronym "We Love Lloyd Spivey," in reference to the original sole station operator.) As a simulcast service of WLLS-AM, the station played a country music format from its 6 AM sign-on until 3 PM, then switched to a Top 40 format from 3 PM until sign-off at 10 PM.

In 1982, the station switched to a full-time country format under the branding LS 106. The station's callsign was switched to WKHB on Oct. 1, 1996. The current WXMZ calls were assigned by the Federal Communications Commission on March 19, 1999. In August 2012, WXMZ moved its signal to its current frequency of 99.9 megahertz where its signal remains to this day, and began broadcasting its current oldies format.

In August 2025, it was announced that WXMZ would be sold to a new locally based organization, Wright Time Broadcasting, presided by long-time station employee Josh Wright. The sale was approved by the FCC the following month.

== Programming ==
In addition to its usual oldies format, WXMZ broadcasts a locally produced public affairs named Midday at the Z with Josh Wright at noon weekdays. Mornings with Sam Alford can be heard Monday through Friday from 6 to 10 a.m., with local news and weather. The station is also the exclusive radio broadcast home to Ohio County High School Eagles sports broadcasts, including football, baseball and boys’ and girls’ basketball games sanctioned by the Kentucky High School Athletic Association (KHSAA).

In September 2025, the station joined the UK Sports Network to carry University of Kentucky Wildcats football and men's basketball games.

== Coverage area ==
In addition to Ohio County, WXMZ's radio signal can also cover significant areas parts of neighboring counties such as Butler, Muhlenberg, McLean, southern Daviess, and nearby portions of western Grayson County, including Central City, Livermore, the southern suburbs of Owensboro, and Caneyville, respectively. Grade B quality signal coverage from WXMZ can also be received as far west as Madisonville, as far east as the Mammoth Cave/Nolin Lake area of Edmonson County, as far south as Russellville, and as far north as the areas along U.S. Route 60 between Owensboro and Hardinsburg.
