= Ohio County, Kentucky =

County in Kentucky, United States

- County
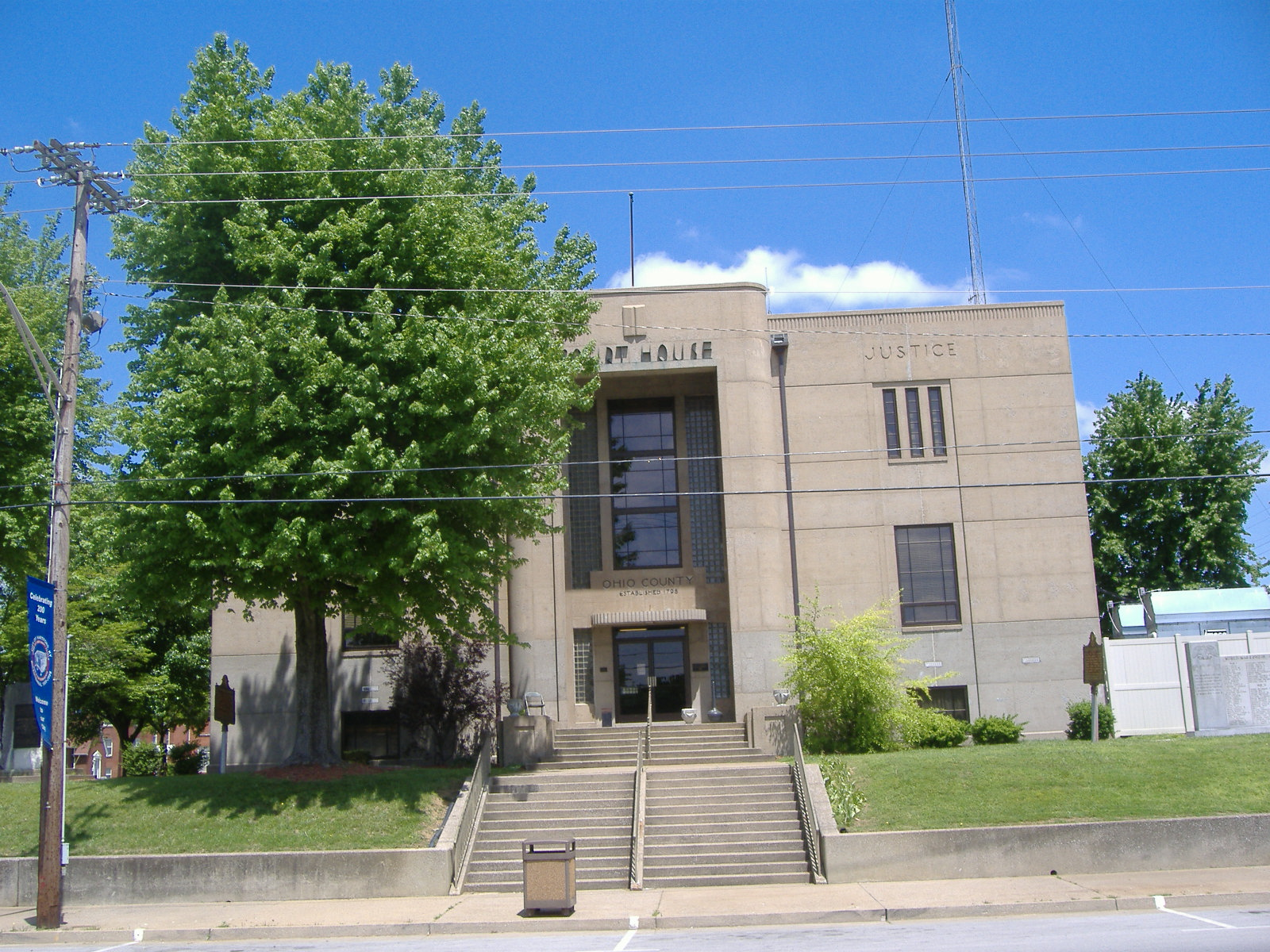
- Ohio County Courthouse in Hartford

- Location within the U.S. state of Kentucky
- Coordinates: 37°28′N 86°50′W
- Country: United States
- State: Kentucky
- Founded: December 17, 1798
- Named for: The Ohio River
- Seat: Hartford
- Largest city: Beaver Dam

Government
  - Judge/Executive: David Johnston (R)

Area
  - Total: 596 sq mi (1,540 km^{2})
  - Land: 587 sq mi (1,520 km^{2})
  - Water: 9.0 sq mi (23 km^{2}) 1.5%

Population (2020)
  - Total: 23,772
  - Estimate (2025): 23,934 ▲
  - Density: 40.5/sq mi (15.6/km^{2})
- Time zone: UTC−6 (Central)
  - Summer (DST): UTC−5 (CDT)
- Congressional district: 2nd
- Website: ohiocounty.ky.gov

Ohio County is a county located in the U.S. state of Kentucky. As of the 2020 census, the population was 23,772. Its county seat is Hartford, and its largest city is Beaver Dam. The county is named after the Ohio River, which originally formed its northern border. It is a moist county, which means that the sale of alcohol is only legal within certain city limits.

== History ==
Ohio County was formed in 1798 from land taken from Hardin County. Ohio was the 35th Kentucky county in order of formation. It was named for the Ohio River, which originally formed its northern boundary, but it lost its northern portions in 1829, when Daviess County and Hancock County were formed. The first settlements in Ohio County were Barnetts Station and Hartford. In January 1865, during the American Civil War, the courthouse in Hartford was burned by Kentucky Confederate cavalry because it was being used to house soldiers of the occupying Union army. However, the county records were removed first and preserved. Ohio County is famous for its coal mines, and was the second place county producing coal in Kentucky.

== Geography ==
According to the United States Census Bureau, the county has a total area of 596 square miles (1,540 km^{2}), of which 587 square miles (1,520 km^{2}) is land and 9.0 square miles (23 km^{2}) (1.5%) is water. It is the fifth-largest county by area in Kentucky.

Ohio County is part of the Western Coal Field region of Kentucky. Much of Ohio County is farmland and the eastern and northern parts have rolling hills. Of the 120 counties in Kentucky, it is the fifth largest. The county is intersected by the Rough River and the Green River runs along its southwestern border.

=== Adjacent counties ===
- Hancock County (north)
- Breckinridge County (northeast)
- Grayson County (east)
- Butler County (southeast)
- Muhlenberg County (southwest)
- McLean County (west)
- Daviess County (northwest)

== Demographics ==
Historical population
| Census | Pop. | Note | %± |
|---|---|---|---|
| 1800 | 1,223 | | — |
| 1810 | 3,792 | | 210.1% |
| 1820 | 3,879 | | 2.3% |
| 1830 | 4,715 | | 21.6% |
| 1840 | 6,592 | | 39.8% |
| 1850 | 9,749 | | 47.9% |
| 1860 | 12,209 | | 25.2% |
| 1870 | 15,561 | | 27.5% |
| 1880 | 19,669 | | 26.4% |
| 1890 | 22,946 | | 16.7% |
| 1900 | 27,287 | | 18.9% |
| 1910 | 27,642 | | 1.3% |
| 1920 | 26,473 | | −4.2% |
| 1930 | 24,469 | | −7.6% |
| 1940 | 24,421 | | −0.2% |
| 1950 | 20,840 | | −14.7% |
| 1960 | 17,725 | | −14.9% |
| 1970 | 18,790 | | 6.0% |
| 1980 | 21,765 | | 15.8% |
| 1990 | 21,105 | | −3.0% |
| 2000 | 22,916 | | 8.6% |
| 2010 | 23,842 | | 4.0% |
| 2020 | 23,772 | | −0.3% |
| 2025 (est.) | 23,934 | ▲ | 0.7% |
U.S. Decennial Census; 1790–1960 1900–1990; 1990-2000 2010–2020

=== 2020 census ===
As of the 2020 census, the county had a population of 23,772. The median age was 40.7 years. 24.5% of residents were under the age of 18 and 18.9% of residents were 65 years of age or older. For every 100 females there were 99.3 males, and for every 100 females age 18 and over there were 96.6 males age 18 and over.

The racial makeup of the county was 92.8% White, 0.7% Black or African American, 0.2% American Indian and Alaska Native, 0.2% Asian, 0.0% Native Hawaiian and Pacific Islander, 2.7% from some other race, and 3.3% from two or more races. Hispanic or Latino residents of any race comprised 4.2% of the population.

23.8% of residents lived in urban areas, while 76.2% lived in rural areas.

There were 9,280 households in the county, of which 31.9% had children under the age of 18 living with them and 23.5% had a female householder with no spouse or partner present. About 25.3% of all households were made up of individuals and 11.7% had someone living alone who was 65 years of age or older.

There were 10,159 housing units, of which 8.7% were vacant. Among occupied housing units, 74.1% were owner-occupied and 25.9% were renter-occupied. The homeowner vacancy rate was 1.6% and the rental vacancy rate was 5.4%.

=== 2000 census ===
As of the census of 2000, there were 22,916 people, 8,899 households, and 6,585 families residing in the county. The population density was 39 per square mile (15/km^{2}). There were 9,909 housing units at an average density of 17 per square mile (6.6/km^{2}). The racial makeup of the county was 97.71% White, 0.75% Black or African American, 0.19% Native American, 0.20% Asian, 0.03% Pacific Islander, 0.45% from other races, and 0.67% from two or more races. 1.01% of the population were Hispanic or Latino of any race.

There were 8,899 households, out of which 33.00% had children under the age of 18 living with them, 61.20% were married couples living together, 9.20% had a female householder with no husband present, and 26.00% were non-families. 23.20% of all households were made up of individuals, and 11.10% had someone living alone who was 65 years of age or older. The average household size was 2.54 and the average family size was 2.98.

In the county, the population was spread out, with 24.90% under the age of 18, 8.60% from 18 to 24, 27.50% from 25 to 44, 24.60% from 45 to 64, and 14.40% who were 65 years of age or older. The median age was 38 years. For every 100 females there were 96.60 males. For every 100 females age 18 and over, there were 94.20 males.

The median income for a household in the county was $29,557, and the median income for a family was $34,970. Males had a median income of $29,778 versus $19,233 for females. The per capita income for the county was $15,317. About 13.90% of families and 17.30% of the population were below the poverty line, including 21.90% of those under age 18 and 15.70% of those age 65 or over.

7.1% of the workforce in the county comes from coal production. In December 2019, more than half of the coal workforce, 3.5% of the county's total workforce, received WARN notices that their coal mine was closing and they would be laid off in February 2020.

== Communities ==
=== Cities ===
- Beaver Dam
- Centertown
- Fordsville
- Hartford (county seat)
- McHenry
- Rockport

=== Census-designated place ===
- Pleasant Ridge (partially in Daviess County)
- Rosine

=== Other unincorporated places ===
==== North ====
- Adaburg
- Aetnaville
- Beda
- Buford
- Coffman
- Deanefield
- Haynesville
- Heflin
- Herbert
- Magan
- Narrows
- Reynolds Station (partially in Hancock County)
- Shreve
- Silver Beach
- Taffy

==== South ====
- Baizetown
- Ceralvo
- Cool Springs
- Cromwell
- Dundee
- Echols
- Equality
- Horse Branch
- Matanzas
- Neafus (partially in Grayson County, mostly in Butler County)
- Olaton
- Prentiss
- Select
- Simmons
- Shultztown
- Smallhous
- Wysox

== Media ==
Ohio County is part of the Owensboro radio market and the Evansville, Indiana television media market. Charter Communications is the county's primary cable television provider under the Spectrum name.

Locally based media outlets in Ohio County include a weekly newspaper, The Ohio County Monitor, and Oldies-formatted radio station WXMZ.

Additionally, the transmission facility of K-Love owned-and-operated radio station WEKV is located just south of Pleasant Ridge.

== Notable people ==
- Ramsey Carpenter, Miss Kentucky 2014, competitor for the title of Miss America 2015
- James Earp, lawman, soldier, and saloon-keeper, member of the Nicholas Porter Earp's family
- Newton Earp, Civil War soldier
- Virgil Earp, lawman and soldier
- John Givens, first coach of Kentucky Colonels professional basketball team
- Bill Monroe, known as the father of bluegrass music
- George H. Tichenor, inventor of Dr. Tichenor's antiseptic
- Pendleton Vandiver, 'Uncle Pen', who inspired the music of Bill Monroe was a resident of Rosine
- Ray Chapman, only Major League Baseball player ever killed in a game
- The Crabb Family, a Southern gospel family group

== Politics ==
United States presidential election results for Ohio County, Kentucky
| Year | Republican | | Democratic | | Third party(ies) | |
| Year | No. | % | No. | % | No. | % |
|---|---|---|---|---|---|---|
| 1912 | 1,150 | 19.49% | 2,563 | 43.45% | 2,186 | 37.06% |
| 1916 | 3,286 | 52.89% | 2,723 | 43.83% | 204 | 3.28% |
| 1920 | 5,371 | 56.12% | 4,011 | 41.91% | 189 | 1.97% |
| 1924 | 4,267 | 50.65% | 3,817 | 45.31% | 341 | 4.05% |
| 1928 | 5,690 | 66.83% | 2,784 | 32.70% | 40 | 0.47% |
| 1932 | 4,880 | 49.12% | 4,870 | 49.02% | 184 | 1.85% |
| 1936 | 4,532 | 52.77% | 4,030 | 46.92% | 27 | 0.31% |
| 1940 | 4,451 | 54.25% | 3,729 | 45.45% | 24 | 0.29% |
| 1944 | 4,494 | 58.69% | 3,131 | 40.89% | 32 | 0.42% |
| 1948 | 3,300 | 53.30% | 2,721 | 43.95% | 170 | 2.75% |
| 1952 | 4,428 | 62.00% | 2,700 | 37.80% | 14 | 0.20% |
| 1956 | 4,901 | 64.07% | 2,726 | 35.64% | 22 | 0.29% |
| 1960 | 5,230 | 68.37% | 2,420 | 31.63% | 0 | 0.00% |
| 1964 | 2,979 | 47.38% | 3,303 | 52.54% | 5 | 0.08% |
| 1968 | 3,504 | 54.16% | 1,695 | 26.20% | 1,271 | 19.64% |
| 1972 | 2,392 | 71.75% | 906 | 27.17% | 36 | 1.08% |
| 1976 | 3,764 | 51.30% | 3,508 | 47.81% | 65 | 0.89% |
| 1980 | 5,272 | 59.10% | 3,486 | 39.08% | 163 | 1.83% |
| 1984 | 5,119 | 60.82% | 3,253 | 38.65% | 45 | 0.53% |
| 1988 | 4,910 | 57.46% | 3,612 | 42.27% | 23 | 0.27% |
| 1992 | 3,385 | 38.18% | 4,022 | 45.37% | 1,458 | 16.45% |
| 1996 | 3,475 | 43.05% | 3,487 | 43.20% | 1,110 | 13.75% |
| 2000 | 5,413 | 60.94% | 3,303 | 37.19% | 166 | 1.87% |
| 2004 | 6,311 | 62.93% | 3,627 | 36.17% | 90 | 0.90% |
| 2008 | 5,687 | 57.22% | 4,059 | 40.84% | 192 | 1.93% |
| 2012 | 6,470 | 67.07% | 2,987 | 30.97% | 189 | 1.96% |
| 2016 | 7,942 | 76.38% | 2,080 | 20.00% | 376 | 3.62% |
| 2020 | 8,582 | 77.11% | 2,404 | 21.60% | 143 | 1.28% |
| 2024 | 8,679 | 79.35% | 2,094 | 19.15% | 164 | 1.50% |

=== Elected officials ===
Elected officials as of January 3, 2025
| U.S. House | Brett Guthrie (R) | KY 2 |
| Ky. Senate | Stephen Meredith (R) | 5 |
| Ky. House | Scott Lewis (R) | 14 |

== See also ==
- National Register of Historic Places listings in Ohio County, Kentucky
