= KQIK (AM) =

Radio station in Lakeview, Oregon (1956–2013)

Lakeview, Oregon; United States
- Frequency: 1230 kHz

Programming
- Language: English
- Format: Defunct
- Affiliations: Citadel Media, Dial Global

Ownership
- Owner: Joseph E. Kalisek

History
- First air date: December 5, 1956
- Last air date: November 1, 2011 (License officially canceled on April 3, 2013)
- Former call signs: KQIK (1956–1994); KRIT (October 1994-November 1994)

Technical information
- Licensing authority: FCC
- Facility ID: 48648
- Class: C
- Power: 1,000 watts (unlimited)
- Transmitter coordinates: 42°12′30″N 120°21′39″W

Links
- Public license information: Public file; LMS

KQIK (1230 AM) was an American radio station licensed to serve the community of Lakeview, Oregon. The station, which began broadcasting in 1956, was owned by Joseph E. Kalisek.

== Programming ==
As of November 1, 2011, KQIK is silent pending the signing of a lease for the station's studio and transmitter location. KQIK normally broadcasts a country music format branded as "K-Country 1230" and including programming from both Citadel Media and Dial Global. Syndicated music programming includes America's Grand Ole Opry Weekend from Westwood One.

In addition to its music programming, KQIK aired high school football games and select other sporting events featuring the Lakeview High School Honkers as a member of the Table Rock Sports Network. KQIK aired University of Oregon Ducks football as a member of the Oregon Sports Network.

== History ==
This station began regular operations on December 5, 1956, broadcasting with 250 watts of power on a frequency of 1230 kHz. Assigned the legal call sign KQIK, the station was originally owned and operated by Pacific Northwest Radio, Inc. KQIK was authorized to increase the power of its daytime signal to 1,000 watts beginning in 1967.

KQIK was acquired by Lake County Communications, Inc., on April 1, 1974. From the late 1960s through the late 1970s, the station aired a middle of the road music format with 10 to 12 hours of country music programming each week.

In August 1984, Lake County Communications, Inc., reached an agreement to sell this station to KQIK, Ltd. The deal was approved by the FCC on October 9, 1984, and the transaction was consummated on November 25, 1985.

In May 1993, KQIK, Ltd., reached an agreement to sell this station to New Start Enterprises, Inc. The deal was approved by the FCC on June 30, 1993, and the transaction was consummated on October 10, 1994. The new owners had the Federal Communications Commission change the station's call sign to KRIT on October 21, 1994. This change would prove short-lived as the station was reassigned the KQIK call sign by the FCC on November 7, 1994.

In December 1998, New Start Enterprises, Inc., reached an agreement to transfer the broadcast license for this station to the Clause Charitable Remainder Trust. The deal was approved by the FCC on April 9, 1999, and the transaction was consummated on June 14, 1999.

In August 2003, the Clause Charitable Remainder Trust (Beverly J. Clause, trustee) reached an agreement to sell this station and FM sister station KQIK-FM to Crystal Clear Broadcasting Company, Inc., for a combined sale price of $118,000. The deal was approved by the FCC on October 17, 2003, and the transaction was consummated on December 10, 2003. At the time of the sale, both stations broadcast country music formats.

On May 27, 2011, Crystal Clear Broadcasting Company, Inc., signed an agreement to sell KQIK (without its FM sister station) to Joseph E. Kalisek for a total price of $12,500. The FCC approved the deal on September 21, 2011, and the transaction was formally consummated on October 31, 2011. The next day, on November 1, 2011, the station went dark as the previous owners had not yet delivered the lease agreement for the station's studio location and broadcast transmitter site. As of December 5, 2011, the station is still silent pending completion of this agreement.

In 2012 Lake County Radio, LLC purchased the former KQIK-FM including the studio and transmitter site of KQIK. At that time all the KQIK equipment had been removed by Kalisek and Woodrow Michael Warren (owner of KLCR-FM in Lakeview). A lease was offered to Kalisek but Kalisek never responded to the offer, so after waiting for the one-year silent period to expire the tower was dismantled on December 29 and 30, 2012 and taken to Burns, Oregon where it will be reused for KBNH as part of a two-tower directional array. KBNH has a CP to change frequencies from 1230 to 1210 with a day power of 12,000 watts and a night power of 600 watts using the same directional pattern day and night.

In a letter dated January 18, 2011, the FCC notified Kalisek that "the broadcast license for station KQIK(AM) will automatically expire as a matter of law if broadcast operations do not commence by 12:01 a.m., November 2, 2012."

On April 12, 2013, the FCC cancelled the station's license, due to it having been silent for more than twelve months.
