= Ceralvo Masonic Hall and School =

- U.S. National Register of Historic Places
- Location within Kentucky Location within the United States
- Location: 942 Ceralvo Rd., Centertown, Kentucky
- Coordinates: 37°21′59″N 87°01′52″W
- NRHP reference No.: 15000655
- Added to NRHP: October 15, 2015

The Ceralvo Masonic Hall and School, in Centertown, Kentucky, was listed on the National Register of Historic Places in 2015.

The Ceralvo Masonic Hall and School replaced an earlier building that had been built in its area but had burnt down the prior year. It was used for the education of the public, public meetings, and it was a religious facility. It was in significant use through the years of 1897 to 1925 when it served these purposes. After a new school had been built close to the Hall and School, its purpose has shifted to the use of a Methodist church.

It was one of 15 sites approved by the Kentucky Historic Preservation Review Board for NRHP nomination in June 2015.
