= KORV =

- Lakeview, Oregon; United States
- Frequency: 93.5 MHz
- Branding: 93.5 The Goose

Programming
- Format: Classic Country
- Affiliations: CBS Radio, Cumulus Real Country

Ownership
- Owner: Marcie Wade; (M&J Radio, LLC)

History
- First air date: 1986 (as KQIK-FM)
- Former call signs: KQIK-FM (1986–1993); KCTL (1993–1994); KQIK-FM (1994–2011); KWTR (2011–2012)

Technical information
- Licensing authority: FCC
- Facility ID: 48649
- Class: C3
- ERP: 1,000 watts
- HAAT: 290 meters (950 ft)
- Transmitter coordinates: 42°12′18″N 120°19′39″W

Links
- Public license information: Public file; LMS
- Website: https://korv.fm

KORV (93.5 FM) is an American radio station licensed to Lakeview, Oregon, United States. The station is currently owned by Marcie Wade, through licensee M&J Radio, LLC, and features country music from Cumulus' "Real Country" and news from CBS. Sale to Lake County Radio LLC was approved by the FCC on June 5, 2012 and the closing took place on June 8, 2012. The sale included the studio and transmitter site of the former KQIK, which is now silent. Woodrow Michael Warren, owner of KLCR, also in Lakeview, had attempted to purchase the station, but the application was withdrawn on January 12, 2012 when Warren defaulted on the purchase. While Warren was attempting to purchase the station it was briefly KWTR, but it never operated with that call sign. The KWTR call sign had been used by Warren for a station in Texas, that station license was cancelled by the FCC on May 16, 2011. Lake County Radio LLC was owned by Linc & Joan Reed-Nickerson. The Reed-Nickersons also owned Harney County Radio LLC licensee of KBNH and KORC in Burns, OR.

Lake County Radio sold KORV to M&J Radio, LLC effective June 30, 2016 for $84,000.
