= Fordsville, Kentucky =

- City
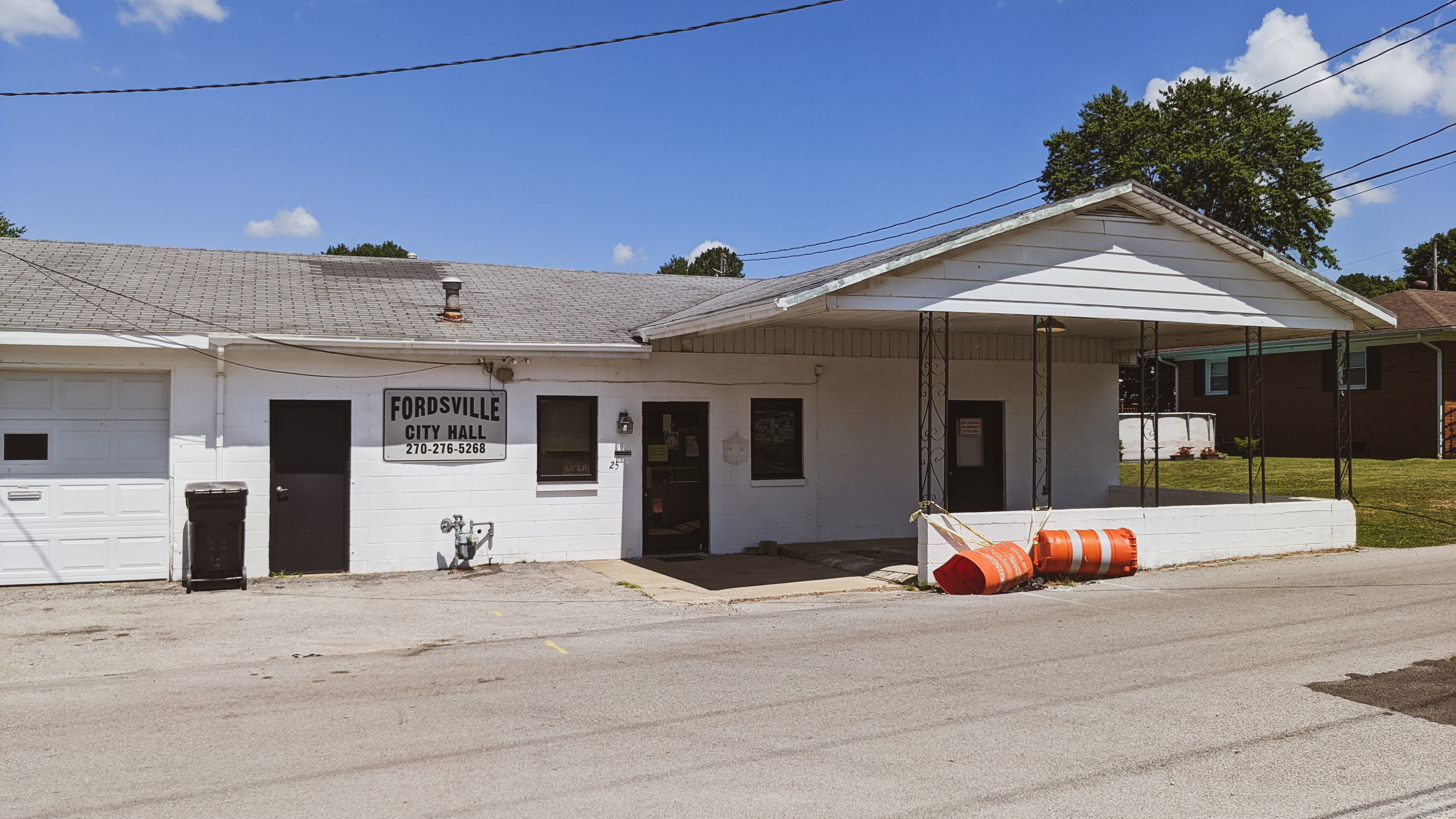
- Fordsville City Hall

- Location of Fordsville in Ohio County, Kentucky.
- Coordinates: 37°38′5″N 86°43′0″W
- Country: United States
- State: Kentucky
- County: Ohio

Area
  - Total: 0.45 sq mi (1.16 km^{2})
  - Land: 0.45 sq mi (1.16 km^{2})
  - Water: 0 sq mi (0.00 km^{2})
- Elevation: 499 ft (152 m)

Population (2020)
  - Total: 446
  - Density: 995.5/sq mi (384.38/km^{2})
- Time zone: UTC-6 (Central (CST))
  - Summer (DST): UTC-5 (CDT)
- ZIP code: 42343
- Area code: 270
- FIPS code: 21-28270
- GNIS feature ID: 0492316
- Website: fordsvilleky.webflow.io

Fordsville is a home rule-class city in Ohio County, Kentucky, in the United States. As of the 2020 census, Fordsville had a population of 446.

== History ==
Settled c. 1830, the town is named for early merchant and probable founder Elisha Ford. It was formally incorporated by the state assembly in 1886.

== Geography ==
According to the United States Census Bureau, the city has a total area of 0.5 square miles (1.3 km^{2}), all land.

== Demographics ==
Historical population
Census	Pop.	Note	%±
1880	85		—
1890	281		230.6%
1900	586		108.5%
1910	649		10.8%
1920	612		−5.7%
1930	573		−6.4%
1940	587		2.4%
1950	533		−9.2%
1960	524		−1.7%
1970	489		−6.7%
1980	561		14.7%
1990	522		−7.0%
2000	531		1.7%
2010	524		−1.3%
2020	446		−14.9%
U.S. Decennial Census

As of the census of 2000, there were 531 people, 200 households, and 121 families residing in the city. The population density was 1,111.5 inhabitants per square mile (429.2/km^{2}). There were 227 housing units at an average density of 475.2 per square mile (183.5/km^{2}). The racial makeup of the city was 99.62% White, 0.19% African American, and 0.19% from two or more races.

There were 200 households, out of which 29.0% had children under the age of 18 living with them, 43.0% were married couples living together, 14.5% had a female householder with no husband present, and 39.5% were non-families. 36.0% of all households were made up of individuals, and 22.5% had someone living alone who was 65 years of age or older. The average household size was 2.31 and the average family size was 3.04.

In the city, the population was spread out, with 22.2% under the age of 18, 8.5% from 18 to 24, 21.3% from 25 to 44, 18.6% from 45 to 64, and 29.4% who were 65 years of age or older. The median age was 43 years. For every 100 females, there were 81.2 males. For every 100 females age 18 and over, there were 74.3 males.

The median income for a household in the city was $17,273, and the median income for a family was $22,917. Males had a median income of $27,679 versus $17,917 for females. The per capita income for the city was $14,740. About 25.2% of families and 25.6% of the population were below the poverty line, including 29.6% of those under age 18 and 20.9% of those age 65 or over.

== Event of interest ==
- The Fordsville Tug-of-War Championship - Kentucky's official tug-of-war championship
- Fordsvile Days- A yearly fair that has been going on for 25+ years
