= Hartford, Kentucky =

- City
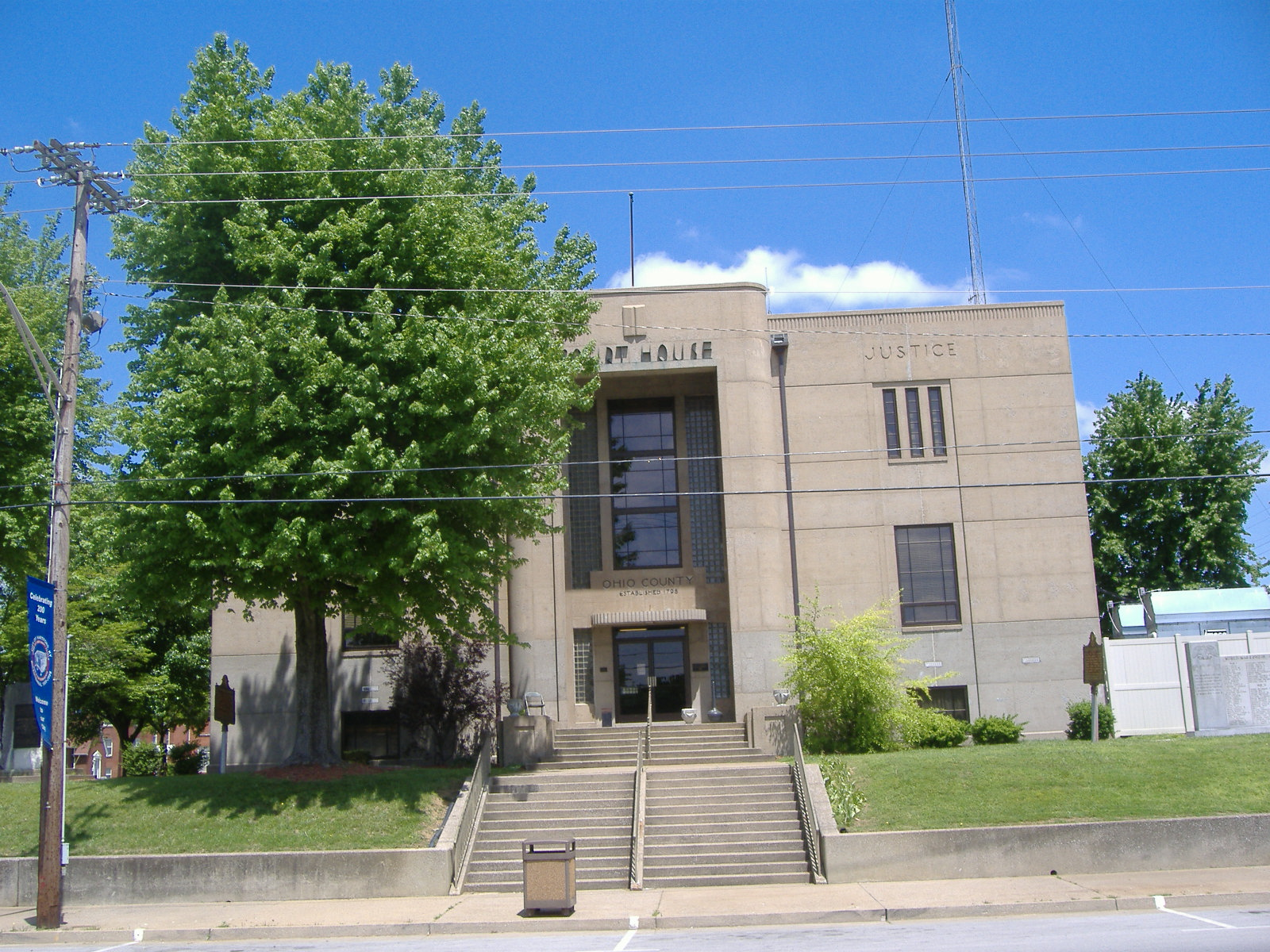
- Ohio County Courthouse in Hartford

- Location of Hartford in Ohio County, Kentucky.
- Coordinates: 37°27′1″N 86°54′7″W
- Country: United States
- State: Kentucky
- County: Ohio
- Settled: Fort Hartford, 1790
- Incorporated: Hartford, 1808
- Named after: a deer crossing in the Rough River

Government
  - Mayor: Beau Wright

Area
  - Total: 2.86 sq mi (7.40 km^{2})
  - Land: 2.84 sq mi (7.35 km^{2})
  - Water: 0.019 sq mi (0.05 km^{2})
- Elevation: 417 ft (127 m)

Population (2020)
  - Total: 2,668
  - Estimate (2022): 2,636
  - Density: 940/sq mi (363.1/km^{2})
- Time zone: UTC-6 (CST)
  - Summer (DST): UTC-5 (CDT)
- ZIP Code: 42347
- Area codes: 270 & 364
- FIPS code: 21-35020
- GNIS feature ID: 0493841
- Website: https://hartfordky.org/

Hartford is a home rule-class city in Ohio County, Kentucky, in the United States. It is the seat of its county. The population was 2,668 at the 2020 census. The town slogan, "Home of 2,000 happy people and a few soreheads", welcomes visitors when they enter the community. The Hartford, Kentucky website explains that "soreheads are community-minded, progressive citizens who work to promote civic pride".

== History ==
The town was initially part of a 4000-acre grant from Virginia to Gabriel Madison. The area was surveyed in 1782 and settled before 1790. Fort Hartford (also known as Hartford Station) grew up around the head of navigation on the Rough River, which the bridge crossing that river is called the Fort Hartford Bridge. About the town, It initially faced Indian attacks but was named the seat of Ohio County the year after its formation in 1798 in exchange for a grant of land from Mr. Madison. The post office was established as Hartford Court House in 1801 and the settlement was formally incorporated by the state assembly in 1808.

An account written in the early 1800s by a William Smithers relates that he and several other settlers helped build "a fort at Hartford on Rough Creek" in 1782–83, which local tradition asserts was the first permanent settlement in Ohio County and the entire lower Green River Valley. It is believed to have consisted of a stockade and small log buildings on the bluff above the Rough River now occupied by Hartford's water plant. Although many believe the town's name refers to a ford on the Rough River (a large tributary of the Green River then known as Rough Creek), and an early settler who operated a ferry there, the name's origin remains uncertain.

The town's second courthouse was burned during the Civil War by Confederate Gen. Hylan B. Lyon on December 20, 1864.

The town was finally connected to the L&N network in 1909.

=== Downtown Historic District of Hartford ===
The Downtown Hartford Historic District consists of 18 locations occupying the courthouse square, approximately two blocks on Main St. and E. Union St. north of the square, and three properties immediately south and east of the courthouse. All except one location, a circa 1870 brick house, are commercial and institutional buildings representing three architecturally distinct periods: the late nineteenth to early twentieth century, 1920 to 1930, and the late 1930s to early 1940s. The earliest group of commercial buildings includes the district's only two constructed of wood; in addition, four are of masonry construction, including two with cast iron fronts. Among the five buildings representing the decade ending in 1930, one dates to the late nineteenth century but had its main façade reconstructed in the 1920s. From the late Depression years, two buildings were private endeavors and three were the result of a federally sponsored public works program. Most of the buildings are two stories tall, although a few are a single story and the courthouse is two stories on a full raised basement.

Several elements of the Downtown Hartford Historic District, including the courthouse, jail and main block of the Hartford City Hall, remain virtually intact on the exterior. As in most downtowns, however, storefronts have suffered the greatest changes. Fortunately, most of the upper elevations of these buildings have been well preserved so that the district's streetscape retains its historic character. Despite alterations, the district remains a visually distinct entity due to the extensively renovated older buildings and new construction that define its edges.

== Economic Development ==
The Ohio County Economic Development Alliance (OCEDA) is the main economic development organization for Ohio County, Kentucky and is located in Hartford. OCEDA staff assists the local business community, site selectors, developers, and investors by identifying support programs, providing data (i.e., demographics), assisting with site selection, workforce development, and general project support. According to data provided by OCEDA, 163 businesses employ 1,886 employees in Hartford Kentucky. Leading industries in Hartford include: Healthcare/Social Assistance, Public Administration, Retail Trade Business, Educational Services, Financial/Insurance, and Food & Beverage Stores. The OC Hub, located in downtown Hartford, provides office space, conference, and training room rentals as a business incubator.

== Geography ==
Hartford is located at 37°27′1″N 86°54′7″W (37.450415, -86.902026).

With a population of approximately 2,000, Hartford is the county seat of Ohio County, Kentucky, which is in the eastern end of Kentucky's western coal fields and geographically one of the state's largest counties. The town covers approximately 1.8 square miles on the southeast bank of the Rough River a few miles southwest of the center of the county. Its gently rolling terrain characteristic of the county overall is laid out primarily in a somewhat irregular grid interrupted by rural roads at its northern reaches and U.S. 231, the town's major access, near its southern boundary. Hartford's oldest and most densely developed portion is its western area along the Rough River which continues to display the town's original early nineteenth-century plan in its grid of small square and larger rectangular blocks.

According to the United States Census Bureau, the city has a total area of 2.6 square miles (6.7 km^{2}), all land.

== Demographics ==
Historical population
Census	Pop.	Note	%±
1800	74		—
1810	110		48.6%
1830	242		—
1840	309		27.7%
1850	495		60.2%
1870	511		—
1880	624		22.1%
1890	740		18.6%
1900	785		6.1%
1910	976		24.3%
1920	980		0.4%
1930	1,106		12.9%
1940	1,385		25.2%
1950	1,564		12.9%
1960	1,618		3.5%
1970	1,868		15.5%
1980	2,512		34.5%
1990	2,532		0.8%
2000	2,571		1.5%
2010	2,672		3.9%
2020	2,668		−0.1%
2022 (est.)	2,636		−1.2%
U.S. Decennial Census

=== 2020 census ===
As of the 2020 census, Hartford had a population of 2,668. The median age was 39.3 years. 24.1% of residents were under the age of 18 and 20.2% of residents were 65 years of age or older. For every 100 females there were 91.7 males, and for every 100 females age 18 and over there were 84.2 males age 18 and over.

86.1% of residents lived in urban areas, while 13.9% lived in rural areas.

There were 1,070 households in Hartford, of which 32.1% had children under the age of 18 living in them. Of all households, 41.4% were married-couple households, 18.0% were households with a male householder and no spouse or partner present, and 33.3% were households with a female householder and no spouse or partner present. About 30.5% of all households were made up of individuals and 14.2% had someone living alone who was 65 years of age or older.

There were 1,171 housing units, of which 8.6% were vacant. The homeowner vacancy rate was 2.6% and the rental vacancy rate was 5.3%.

Racial composition as of the 2020 census
Race	Number	Percent
White	2,414	90.5%
Black or African American	37	1.4%
American Indian and Alaska Native	5	0.2%
Asian	17	0.6%
Native Hawaiian and Other Pacific Islander	0	0.0%
Some other race	87	3.3%
Two or more races	108	4.0%
Hispanic or Latino (of any race)	136	5.1%

=== 2000 census ===
As of the census of 2000, there were 2,571 people, 1,079 households, and 684 families residing in the city. The population density was 989.5 inhabitants per square mile (382.0/km^{2}). There were 1,165 housing units at an average density of 448.4 per square mile (173.1/km^{2}). The racial makeup of the city was 96.81% White, 1.40% African American, 0.47% Native American, 0.23% Asian, 0.23% from other races, and 0.86% from two or more races. Hispanic or Latino of any race were 0.86% of the population.

There were 1,079 households, out of which 28.9% had children under the age of 18 living with them, 47.8% were married couples living together, 11.9% had a female householder with no husband present, and 36.6% were non-families. 33.8% of all households were made up of individuals, and 16.6% had someone living alone who was 65 years of age or older. The average household size was 2.24 and the average family size was 2.86.

In the city, the population was spread out, with 22.1% under the age of 18, 10.0% from 18 to 24, 24.7% from 25 to 44, 22.4% from 45 to 64, and 20.8% who were 65 years of age or older. The median age was 40 years. For every 100 females, there were 84.7 males. For every 100 females age 18 and over, there were 79.1 males.

The median income for a household in the city was $24,958, and the median income for a family was $32,083. Males had a median income of $31,020 versus $18,750 for females. The per capita income for the city was $16,542. About 11.8% of families and 15.7% of the population were below the poverty line, including 18.4% of those under age 18 and 23.1% of those age 65 or over.

== Notable people ==
- Louise Alexander – Dancer
- Allison J. Barnett (1892–1971) – U.S. Army major general
- Charles Courtney Curran (1861–1942) - American painter born in Hartford, particularly known for his depiction of women in various settings. Curran studied at both the Fine Arts Academy of Cincinnati, the New York National Academy of Design, and the Academia Jullian in Paris and died in New York City.
- James and Virgil Earp – Brothers of Old West lawman Wyatt Earp
- William Smeathers – Well known frontiersman, Smeathers served on first grand jury of Court of Quarter Sessions at Hartford, 1803; credited as the first settler of Yellow Banks, now Owensboro and cited on Kentucky historical marker #1548 in Hartford.

== Climate ==
The climate in this area is characterized by hot, humid summers and generally mild to cool winters. According to the Köppen Climate Classification system, Hartford has a humid subtropical climate, abbreviated "Cfa" on climate maps.

== Education ==
Hartford has a lending library, the Ohio County Public Library.

Public education in Hartford, Kentucky and Ohio County is provided by the Ohio County Public School district. Wayland Alexander Elementary School, a preschool - 6th grade facility, is located in Hartford. According to the 2021 Kentucky Department of Education Report Card, Wayland Alexander Elementary School served 633 students. The school mascot is a Mustang.

According to the Ohio County Economic Development Alliance, of the 2,684 residents of Hartford in 2021, 584 (21.7%) residents have earned a college degree (Associates to Graduate).

2021 Educational achievement data
Education levels	Citizens
Graduated High School	538
Associate Degree	229
Bachelor's Degree	227
Graduate Degree	128

The former two-year Hartford College existed on East Union Street at the site of the current Ohio County School Board administrative office.
