= Wendell H. Ford Expressway =

Highway around Owensboro, Kentucky

Wendell H. Ford Expressway
- Owensboro Bypass

Route information
- Maintained by KYTC
- Length: 13.057 mi (21.013 km)
- Existed: c. 1967–present
- Component highways: US 60; US 231

Major junctions
- Beltway around Owensboro, Kentucky
- West end: US 60 / KY 331
- Audubon Parkway; US 431 / KY 2831; US 231; I-165; KY 54
- East end: KY 2830

Location
- Country: United States
- State: Kentucky
- Counties: Daviess

Highway system
- United States Numbered Highway System; List; Special; Divided; Kentucky State Highway System; Interstate; US; State; Parkways

The Wendell H. Ford Expressway, also known as the Owensboro Bypass, is a major partial beltway that runs around the outer parts of the city of Owensboro, Kentucky. With a length of 13.057 miles (21.013 km), the expressway includes parts of U.S. Route 60 (US 60) and US 231.

== Road description ==
The expressway begins on the west side of Owensboro at a junction with the original alignment of US 60. Immediately after its start, it has a junction with the Audubon Parkway. After the exit for the Audubon, there are interchanges with Kentucky Route 81 (KY 81), US 431, and US 231. US 231 joins the bypass at the exit for New Hartford Road, and it then intersects Interstate 165 (I-165, the former William H. Natcher Parkway) at that freeway's northern terminus. After the interchange with KY 54 (Leitchfield Road), the road then has additional interchanges with KY 603 and KY 144. The expressway ends at an at-grade intersection with KY 2830, which is part of the original US 60 alignment on the east side of town. US 60/US 231 continues after this point as a regular four-lane highway before the two routes split again. US 231 enters Spencer County, Indiana to the north, while US 60 continues east into Hancock County, Kentucky.

== History ==
=== Construction and opening (1966–73) ===
Construction of the Wendell H. Ford Expressway began in the 1967/68 fiscal year. It began as a two-lane road that went from US 60 to KY 54 on the east side of Owensboro. That segment opened in 1967. By the time the 1968 Official Kentucky Highway Map was released, the expressway expanded to four lanes, and went from the US 60 corridor to the US 431 corridor. The remainder of the expressway from US 431 to another junction with US 60 on the west side of Owensboro was opened to traffic by 1969–70. Interchanges for the Audubon Parkway and the then-new Green River Parkway (later William H. Natcher Parkway, now Interstate 165) were opened upon the opening of the two parkways in 1970 and 1972, respectively.

=== The later years (1974–2012) ===
The expressway eventually received the designation of U.S. Route 60 Bypass (US 60 Byp.). In 2004, US 231 was rerouted onto the expressway and onto US 60 east of town so that it would be rerouted to the completed William H. Natcher Bridge once it was completed during that year. US 231 was previously carried over the Ohio River on the Owensboro Bridge.

=== Expressway extension and the future (2013-present) ===
In 2013, the Owensboro–Daviess County Government voted to reroute the regular US 60 to the expressway. In the middle of 2014, a new alignment of the expressway was completed and rerouted to bypass the eastern side of town, and KY 603 was routed onto the existing section of the expressway. This was done to connect to the campus of Owensboro Health Regional Hospital (which was completed in 2013).

== Major intersections ==
Note: Mileage listings are of US 60 since the Wendell H. Ford Expressway is now classified as US 60 since 2014. The entire route is in Owensboro, Daviess County.

mi	km	Exit	Destinations	Notes
10.179	16.382	-	US 60 west (Henderson Road) / KY 331 north – Henderson	Western terminus; intersection also serves Ben Hawes State Park
10.84	17.45	10	Audubon Parkway west – Henderson, Evansville	Western end of freeway section
11.608	18.681	11	KY 81 (Parrish Avenue) – Owensboro, Calhoun	
12.588	20.258	12	KY 2698 (Carter Road)	
14.398	23.171	14	US 431 south (Frederica Street) / KY 2831 north – Owensboro, Livermore	Northern terminus of US 431
16.462	26.493	16	US 231 south (New Hartford Road) / KY 2155 north – Owensboro, Beaver Dam, Hartford	Western end of US 231 overlap
17.498	28.160	17	I-165 south – Bowling Green	Northern terminus of I-165 (formerly Natcher Parkway)
18.688	30.075	18	KY 54 (Leitchfield Road) – Fordsville, Whitesville, Leitchfield	
19.646	31.617	19	KY 603 (Pleasant Valley Road) – Owensboro	
21.962	35.344	21	KY 144 – Owensboro	
23.236	37.395	-	KY 2830 – Owensboro, Maceo	Eastern terminus; US 60/US 231 continue as a divided four-lane highway with unlimited access
1.000 mi = 1.609 km; 1.000 km = 0.621 mi

== See also ==
- List of parkways and named highways in Kentucky
