= South Carrollton, Kentucky =

- City
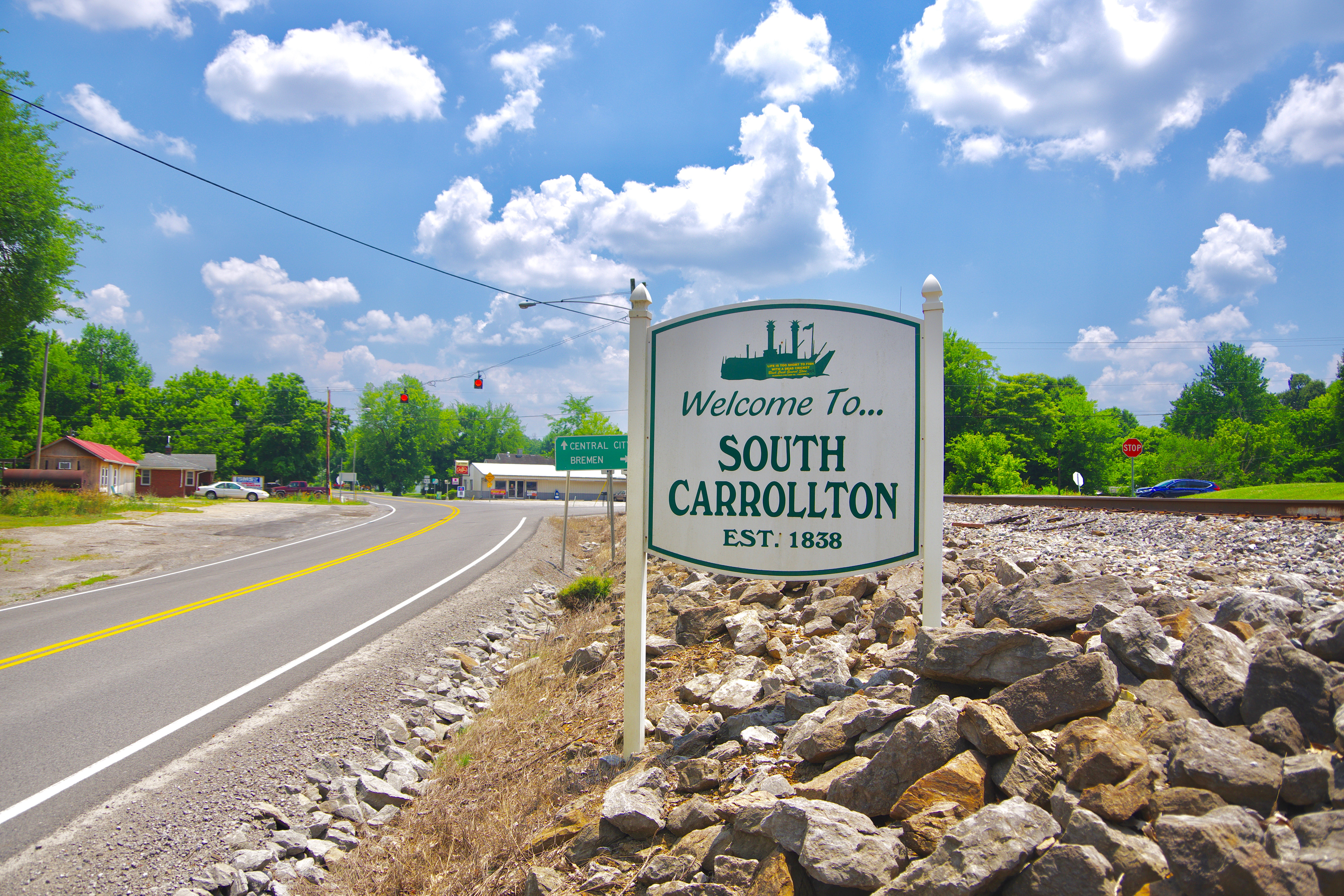
- Welcome sign along US 431

- Location in Muhlenberg County, Kentucky
- Coordinates: 37°20′12″N 87°8′30″W
- Country: United States
- State: Kentucky
- County: Muhlenberg

Area
  - Total: 0.25 sq mi (0.66 km^{2})
  - Land: 0.25 sq mi (0.65 km^{2})
  - Water: 0 sq mi (0.00 km^{2})
- Elevation: 449 ft (137 m)

Population (2020)
  - Total: 141
  - Density: 557.9/sq mi (215.39/km^{2})
- Time zone: UTC-6 (Central (CST))
  - Summer (DST): UTC-5 (CDT)
- ZIP code: 42374
- Area code: 270
- FIPS code: 21-71814
- GNIS feature ID: 0503897

South Carrollton is a home rule-class city in Muhlenberg County, Kentucky, United States. The population was 141 at the 2020 census, down from 184 in 2010. Founded as "Randolph Old Farm" in 1838, an early pioneer changed the name of the city to honor his son, Carroll. The name was prefixed with "South" in order to distinguish it from the city of Carrollton.

== Geography ==
South Carrollton is located in northern Muhlenberg County at 37°20′12″N 87°8′30″W (37.336799, -87.141719). The city lies along the western bank of the Green River, just north of Central City. U.S. Route 431 traverses South Carrollton, connecting the city with Central City to the south and Island to the north. Kentucky Route 81 intersects US 431 in South Carrollton, connecting the city with Bremen and Sacramento to the northwest.

According to the United States Census Bureau, the city has a total area of 0.25 square miles (0.65 km^{2}), of which 0.001 square miles (0.003 km^{2}), or 0.39%, are water.

== Demographics ==
Historical population
Census	Pop.	Note	%±
1870	240		—
1880	493		105.4%
1890	525		6.5%
1900	452		−13.9%
1910	365		−19.2%
1920	328		−10.1%
1930	334		1.8%
1940	296		−11.4%
1950	289		−2.4%
1960	234		−19.0%
1970	218		−6.8%
1980	262		20.2%
1990	202		−22.9%
2000	184		−8.9%
2010	184		0.0%
2020	141		−23.4%
U.S. Decennial Census

As of the census of 2000, there were 184 people, 70 households, and 53 families residing in the city. The population density was 759.2 inhabitants per square mile (293.1/km^{2}). There were 80 housing units at an average density of 330.1 per square mile (127.5/km^{2}). The racial makeup of the city was 97.28% White, 0.54% African American, 0.54% Native American, and 1.63% from two or more races.

There were 70 households, out of which 35.7% had children under the age of 18 living with them, 60.0% were married couples living together, 12.9% had a female householder with no husband present, and 22.9% were non-families. 17.1% of all households were made up of individuals, and 4.3% had someone living alone who was 65 years of age or older. The average household size was 2.63 and the average family size was 2.94.

In the city, the population was spread out, with 22.8% under the age of 18, 9.8% from 18 to 24, 32.1% from 25 to 44, 21.7% from 45 to 64, and 13.6% who were 65 years of age or older. The median age was 39 years. For every 100 females, there were 109.1 males. For every 100 females age 18 and over, there were 118.5 males.

The median income for a household in the city was $27,500, and the median income for a family was $38,750. Males had a median income of $33,125 versus $14,375 for females. The per capita income for the city was $18,183. About 3.7% of families and 14.0% of the population were below the poverty line, including 11.5% of those under the age of eighteen and 9.7% of those 65 or over.
