= Kentucky Route 764 =

State highway in Kentucky, United States

Kentucky Route 764
- KY 764 highlighted in red

Route information
- Maintained by KYTC
- Length: 18.697 mi (30.090 km)

Major junctions
- West end: US 231 south of Masonville
- KY 54 in Whitesvile
- North end: KY 144 west of Pellville

Location
- Country: United States
- State: Kentucky
- Counties: Daviess, Ohio

Highway system
- Kentucky State Highway System; Interstate; US; State; Parkways
← KY 763	→ KY 765

Kentucky Route 764 (KY 764) is a 18.697-mile-long (30.090 km) rural secondary state highway in southern Daviess County and northern Ohio County. It begins at a junction with U.S. Route 231 (US 231) south of Masonville. The road heads to Pleasant Ridge and intersects KY 2115. The road then heads easterly and then passes under Interstate 165 (I-165, William H. Natcher Parkway). KY 764 intersects KY 762, then it passes over the Greasy Creek. It finally intersects KY 1738 before passing back into Daviess County, where it enters the community of Oklahoma. The road goes to Whitesvile, running concurrently with KY 54. KY 764 separates from KY 54, and then intersects KY 2157, and after a few miles, it ends at KY 144 west of Pellville. The first few miles are signed as east–west, with the remaining signed as north–south.

== Major intersections ==
County	Location	mi	km	Destinations	Notes
Daviess		0.000	0.000	US 231	Western terminus
Ohio		1.040	1.674	KY 2115 south (Pleasant Ridge Road)	Northern terminus of KY 2115
Ohio		4.424	7.120	KY 762 north	Southern terminus of KY 762
Ohio		7.127	11.470	KY 1738 east (Old Hickory Lake Road)	Western terminus of KY 1738
Daviess	Whitesville	12.757	20.530	KY 54 east (Main Street)	Southern end of KY 54 overlap
Daviess	Whitesville	12.829	20.646	KY 54 west (Main Street)	Northern end of KY 54 overlap
Daviess		15.518	24.974	KY 2157 north (McCamish Road)	Southern terminus of KY 2157
Daviess		18.697	30.090	KY 144	Northern terminus
1.000 mi = 1.609 km; 1.000 km = 0.621 mi: Concurrency terminus
