= Kentucky Route 2831 =

State highway in Kentucky, United States

Kentucky Route 2831
- Frederica Street
- KY 2831 highlighted in red

Route information
- Maintained by KYTC
- Length: 3.056 mi (4.918 km)
- Existed: 2010–present

Major junctions
- South end: US 60 / US 431 in south Owensboro
- KY 81 / KY 54 in Owensboro
- North end: KY 2245 in downtown Owensboro

Location
- Country: United States
- State: Kentucky
- Counties: Daviess

Highway system
- Kentucky State Highway System; Interstate; US; State; Parkways
← KY 2830	→ KY 2832

Kentucky Route 2831 (KY 2831) is a 3.056-mile (4.918 km) state highway in Owensboro, Daviess County, Kentucky. It runs from U.S. Routes 60 and 431 in southern Owensboro to West Fifth Street (KY 2245) and Frederica Streets in downtown.

== Route description ==
KY 2831 begins at an interchange with the Wendell H. Ford Expressway (U.S. Route 60, US 60) and U.S. Route 431 (US 431), It then reaches an intersection where KY 81 ends and KY 54 begins. KY 2831 ends at the intersection with KY 2245 and West Fifth Street in downtown Owensboro.

== History ==
From 1929 until 1953, the entire route was originally signed as KY 75. US 431 replaced the KY 75 designation in 1953, and remained on Frederica Street within the city, north of the US 60 Bypass (US 60 Byp.; Wendell H. Ford Expressway), until mid-2010, when the new KY 2831 designation replaced the US 431 alignment in the city. US 431 now ends at the junction with the former US 60 Byp.

== Major intersections ==
The entire route is in Owensboro, Daviess County.

mi	km	Destinations	Notes
0.000– 0.082	0.000– 0.132	US 60 (Wendell H. Ford Expressway) / US 431 south (Frederica Street) to I-165 / Audubon Parkway	Southern terminus; US 60 exit 14; continues as US 431 beyond US 60
2.511	4.041	KY 54 east / KY 81 south (West Parrish Avenue)	Western terminus of KY 54; northern terminus of KY 81
3.056	4.918	KY 2245 west / West Fifth Street / Frederica Street	Northern terminus; eastern terminus of KY 2245; continues as Frederica Street beyond West Fifth Street
1.000 mi = 1.609 km; 1.000 km = 0.621 mi
