= Indiana State Road 161 =

State highway in Indiana, United States

State Road 161
- SR 161 highlighted in red

Route information
- Maintained by INDOT
- Length: 49.691 mi (79.970 km)
- Existed: 1931–present

Major junctions
- South end: KY 2262 near Owensboro, KY
- I-64 near Dale
- North end: SR 64 near Huntingburg

Location
- Country: United States
- State: Indiana
- Counties: Dubois, Spencer, Warrick

Highway system
- Indiana State Highway System; Interstate; US; State; Scenic
← SR 160	→ SR 162

State Road 161 in the U.S. state of Indiana is a rural undivided north–south highway in the southwestern portion of the state.

== Route description ==
State Road 161 begins in Spencer County approximately nine miles southwest of Rockport at the northern end of the Owensboro Bridge across the Ohio River in the Ohio Township. It goes north to Reo. From there, it passes into Warrick County, where it has concurrencies with State Road 62 and State Road 68. At the north end of the county it passes over Interstate 64 three times in five miles (8 km), but the only interchange is at the last overpass. State Road 161 ends in Dubois County at State Road 64 approximately four miles west of Huntingburg.

== History ==
The route of SR 161 was extended by nearly 12 miles (19 km) on October 21, 2002, when the Indiana Department of Transportation redesignated the former route of U.S. Route 231 in Spencer County. This came as the US 231 designation was rerouted onto the then-new William H. Natcher Bridge, which opened to traffic on that day.

== Major intersections ==
County	Location	mi	km	Destinations	Notes
Daviess	Owensboro	0.000	0.000	KY 2262 south – Owensboro	Southern terminus of SR 161; continuation into Kentucky
Ohio River		0.000	0.000	Owensboro Bridge	
Spencer	Ohio Township	8.213	13.218	SR 66 east – Rockport	Eastern end of SR 66 concurrency
Spencer	Luce Township	11.471	18.461	SR 66 west – Evansville	Western end of SR 66 concurrency
Warrick	Skelton Township	21.951	35.327	SR 62 west – Boonville, Evansville	Western end of SR 62 concurrency
Warrick	Skelton Township	27.104	43.620	SR 62 east	Eastern end of SR 62 concurrency
Warrick	Pigeon Township	38.485	61.936	SR 68 west – Poseyville	Western end of SR 68 concurrency
Warrick	Pigeon Township	41.955	67.520	SR 68 east – Dale	Eastern end of SR 68 concurrency
Warrick	Pigeon Township	42.619– 42.769	68.589– 68.830	I-64 - St. Louis, Louisville	Exit number 54 on I-64; diamond interchange
Dubois	Patoka Township	49.691	79.970	SR 64 – Oakland City, Huntingburg	Northern terminus of SR 161
1.000 mi = 1.609 km; 1.000 km = 0.621 mi: Concurrency terminus
