= Rockport Generating Station =

Coal-fired power station in Indiana, US

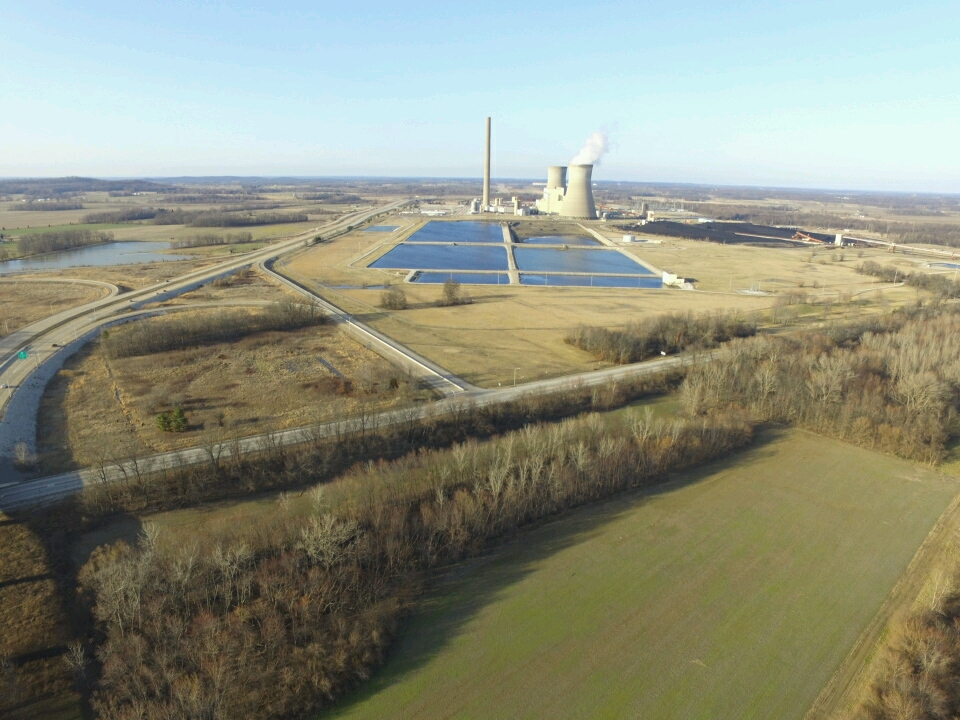
- Rockport Generating Station as seen from near the Natcher Bridge
- Country: United States
- Location: Ohio Township, Spencer County, Indiana
- Coordinates: 37°55′32″N 87°02′02″W
- Status: Operational
- Commission date: Unit 1: December 1984; Unit 2: December 1988
- Decommission date: Unit 1: 2028 (planned); Unit 2: 2028 (planned)
- Owner: Indiana-Michigan Power

Thermal power station
- Primary fuel: Sub-bituminous coal
- Turbine technology: Steam turbine
- Cooling towers: 2 × Natural Draft
- Cooling source: Ohio River

Power generation
- Units operational: 2 × 1300 MW
- Nameplate capacity: 2600 MW
- Capacity factor: 48.0% (2017)
- Annual net output: 10,923 GWh (2017)

Rockport Generating Station is a coal-fired power plant located along the Ohio River in Ohio Township, Spencer County, Indiana, in the United States, near Rockport. The power plant is located along U.S. Route 231 (segment known as the Abraham Lincoln Memorial Parkway), approximately one mile (1.6 km) north of the William H. Natcher Bridge, spanning the Ohio River. It is operated by Indiana Michigan Power, a subsidiary of American Electric Power.

== History ==
Two identical non-cyclonic Babcock & Wilcox units (1,300 MW each) were launched into service in December 1984 and December 1988. They are among the largest coal units built. The plant is connected to the grid by 765 kilovolt transmission lines (the highest rated voltage used in the United States). The power plant features the tallest smokestack in Indiana, and is one of the tallest smokestacks in the world at 1,038 feet (316.4 m).

== Coal supply ==
The coal is delivered to the plant by barges along the Ohio River. The plant burns in excess of seven million short tons of coal a year. To minimize cost, AEP announced in February 2018 that Rockport will rely solely on coal from the Powder River Basin in Wyoming.

== Retirement ==
In July 2019, AEP announced that Rockport's Unit 1 will retire by the end of 2028. This was made in an agreement modification between AEP, the United States Environmental Protection Agency (EPA), several northeastern states, the Sierra Club, and other parties. The agreement allows AEP to achieve emission reduction goals while also shutting down Unit 1 without adding costly pollution control systems.

In April 2021, AEP announced that Rockport's Unit 2 will also be retired by the end of 2028.

== See also ==
- List of largest power stations in the United States
- List of power stations in Indiana
- List of tallest chimneys in the world
