= Kentucky Route 85 =

State highway in Kentucky, United States

Kentucky Route 85
- KY 85 highlighted in red

Route information
- Maintained by KYTC
- Length: 33.150 mi (53.350 km)

Major junctions
- West end: KY 70 near Madisonville
- US 431 near Island
- East end: US 62 near Rockport

Location
- Country: United States
- State: Kentucky
- Counties: Hopkins, McLean, Ohio

Highway system
- Kentucky State Highway System; Interstate; US; State; Parkways
← KY 84	→ KY 86

Kentucky Route 85 (KY 85) is a 33.150-mile-long (53.350 km) state highway in Kentucky that runs from Kentucky Route 70 east of Madisonville to U.S. Route 62 northeast of Rockport via Sacramento and Centertown.

== Route Description ==
KY 85 begins at KY 70 near Anton which then entering to that town. After leaving it, it makes the southern terminus of KY 2082 it then passes into KY 862. While then it passes into the Mclean County and into a small river named Pond River. Then, It then passes into the town of Sacramento. Where it makes concurrency and also making the eastern terminus of KY 254. It then leaves the concurrency to making two southern terminus of KY 2383 and KY 2109. Next, it makes another terminus at KY 2226 it then enters the town of Island and making junctions with KY 85 Bus. and US 431 and also, Makes a concurrency with KY 1412. Finally it passes into the Ohio County. After it passes into that county, it goes near a power plant. It then enters the town of Centertown making a concurrency with KY 69. After that it turns into a rural secondary highway and also making the northern terminus of KY 1903. Also, it finally ends at US 62.

== Major intersections ==
County	Location	mi	km	Destinations	Notes
Hopkins		0.000	0.000	KY 70 (Central City Road)	Western terminus
Hopkins		1.093	1.759	KY 2339 west (Hicklen-Anton Road)	Eastern terminus of KY 2339
Hopkins		2.722	4.381	KY 2082 north (Frostburg Road)	Southern terminus of KY 2082
Hopkins		3.014	4.851	KY 862 west (Smith Todd Road)	Eastern terminus of KY 862
Hopkins		4.254	6.846	KY 862 west (Casner Road)	West end of KY 862 overlap
Hopkins		4.380	7.049	KY 862 east (Babe Nall Road)	East end of KY 862 overlap
McLean		10.147	16.330	KY 81 south	West end of KY 81 overlap
McLean	Sacramento	10.925	17.582	KY 254 west (West Third Street) / East Third Street	Eastern terminus of KY 254
McLean	Sacramento	11.202	18.028	KY 81 north	East end of KY 81 overlap
McLean		11.656	18.759	KY 2383 north (Bibb Road)	Southern terminus of KY 2383
McLean		12.306	19.805	KY 2109 north (Station Road)	Southern terminus of KY 2109
McLean		15.196	24.456	KY 2226 west	Eastern terminus of KY 2226
McLean		16.888	27.179	KY 891 north	Southern terminus of KY 891
McLean		18.457	29.704	KY 2110 north (Old Island-Livermore Road) / Old Island-Livermore Road	Southern terminus of KY 2110
McLean		18.721	30.129	US 431	
McLean		19.053	30.663	KY 1412 east	West end of KY 1412 overlap
McLean		19.778	31.830	KY 1412 west	East end of KY 1412 overlap
Ohio		28.222	45.419	KY 69 south	West end of KY 69 overlap
Ohio		29.059	46.766	KY 69 north	East end of KY 69 overlap
Ohio		30.526	49.127	KY 1903 south (Rockport-Ceralva Road) / Valley Lane	Northern terminus of KY 1903
Ohio		33.150	53.350	US 62	Eastern terminus
1.000 mi = 1.609 km; 1.000 km = 0.621 mi: Concurrency terminus

Hopkins County + KY 81 Overlap + McLean County = 21.858
