= Lake Mill, Indiana =

- Unincorporated community
- Location within Indiana Location within the United States
- Coordinates: 37°56′15″N 87°06′36″W
- Country: United States
- State: Indiana
- County: Spencer
- Township: Ohio
- Elevation: 400 ft (122 m)
- Time zone: UTC-6 (Central (CST))
  - Summer (DST): UTC-5 (CDT)
- ZIP code: 47635
- Area codes: 812, 930
- GNIS feature ID: 437534

Lake Mill is an unincorporated community in Ohio Township, Spencer County, in the U.S. state of Indiana.

It is located just north of the unincorporated community of Reo.

== Geography ==
Lake Mill is located at 37°56′15″N 87°06′36″W.
