= Interstate 369 =

Interstate 369 may refer to:

- Interstate 369 (Texas), a freeway in Texarkana, Texas
- Interstate 369 (Kentucky), the proposed future designation of a section of the Audubon Parkway in Kentucky
