= Crossroads, Kentucky =

Crossroads, Kentucky, may refer to historic names for:

- Florence, Kentucky
- Sacramento, Kentucky
