= Kentucky Route 2262 =

State highway in Kentucky, United States

Kentucky Route 2262
- J.R. Miller Boulevard
- KY 2262 highlighted in red

Route information
- Maintained by KYTC
- Length: 1.494 mi (2.404 km)

Major junctions
- South end: KY 54 / J. R. Miller Boulevard in downtown Owensboro
- KY 2155 / KY 2245 in Owensboro
- North end: SR 161 near Owensboro

Location
- Country: United States
- State: Kentucky
- Counties: Daviess

Highway system
- Kentucky State Highway System; Interstate; US; State; Parkways
← KY 2261	→ KY 2263

Kentucky Route 2262 (KY 2262) is a 1.494-mile (2.404 km) state highway in Kentucky and a small portion of Indiana. It runs from Kentucky Route 54 and J.R. Miller Boulevard in downtown Owensboro, Kentucky, to Indiana State Road 161 on the north end of the Glover Cary Bridge, 0.245 miles (0.394 km) north of the Indiana state line.

== Route description ==
Its southern terminus is at the corner of JR Miller Boulevard and Parrish Avenue (KY 54) in downtown Owensboro. It then crosses the original alignment of U.S. Route 60 (US 60) and the Ohio River via the Owensboro Bridge and terminates at the end of that bridge, which marks the Kentucky-Indiana state line. The road continues as Indiana State Road 161 (SR 161) into Spencer County, Indiana.

== History ==
Af first, KY 75 connected with SR 75 on the bridge from the bridge's 1940 opening to the early 1950s. From 1952 until the 2001–02 fiscal year, US 231 followed the current KY 2262 and SR 161 alignments in the area. US 231 was rerouted onto US 60 east of Owensboro and onto a new alignment leading to the William H. Natcher Bridge in northeastern Daviess County into southern Spencer County upon that bridge's grand opening on October 21, 2002. Originally, KY 2155 followed this alignment from 2002 until 2011, when the street was reassigned the current KY 2262 designation.

== Major intersections ==
State	County	Location	mi	km	Destinations	Notes
Kentucky	Daviess	Owensboro	0.000	0.000	KY 54 (West Parrish Avenue) / J R Miller Boulevard	Southern terminus; continues as J R Millen Boulevard beyond KY 54
Kentucky	Daviess	Owensboro	0.514	0.827	KY 2155 south / KY 2245 east (East Fifth Street)	Northern terminus of KY 2155; western terminus of KY 2245
Ohio River			1.137	1.830	Glover Cary Bridge over Ohio River	
Indiana	Spencer		1.494	2.404	SR 161 north	Northern terminus
1.000 mi = 1.609 km; 1.000 km = 0.621 mi

== See also ==
- List of crossings of the Ohio River
