= Kentucky Route 2155 =

State highway in Kentucky, United States

Kentucky Route 2155
- KY 2155 highlighted in red

Route information
- Maintained by KYTC
- Length: 3.447 mi (5.547 km)
- Existed: 2002–present

Major junctions
- South end: US 231 (Wendell H. Ford Expressway) / US 60 in south Owensboro
- KY 1432; KY 54
- North end: KY 2262 in downtown Owensboro

Location
- Country: United States
- State: Kentucky
- Counties: Daviess

Highway system
- Kentucky State Highway System; Interstate; US; State; Parkways
← KY 2154	→ KY 2156

Kentucky Route 2155 (KY 2155) is an urban secondary north–south state highway located entirely in Owensboro in northwest Kentucky.

== Route description ==
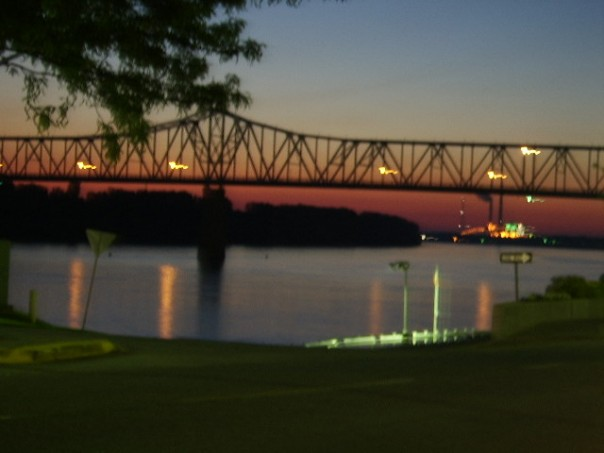
Owensboro Bridge

KY 2155 begins at an interchange with Wendell H. Ford Expressway (U.S. Route 60, US 60) and US 231 on the south side of Owensboro. It follows New Hartford Road north of the expressway, then follows a one-way couplet. Northbound lanes follow Breckinridge Street, while KY 2155 southbound follows Triplet Street. It intersects Parrish Avenue (KY 54). It continues as a one-way couplet until it reaches East Fifth Street. There, KY 2155 follows Fifth Street until it reaches its northern terminus at the junction with J.R. Miller Boulevard (KY 2262) in downtown Owensboro.

== History ==
The state originally assigned KY 71 to follow this alignment on Hartford Road, along with the current alignment of KY 298 throughout Daviess County from its 1929 inception until 1952, when US 231 took over all of KY 71's original alignment.

The KY 2155 designation came to the road on October 21, 2002, when US 231 was rerouted onto the Wendell H. Ford Expressway and US 60 south and east of town to follow a new alignment to the then-new William H. Natcher Bridge into Spencer County, Indiana.

From 2002 until 2011, KY 2155 followed the J.R. Miller Boulevard onto the Owensboro Bridge to terminate at the Kentucky-Indiana state line and the Ohio River. KY 2262 was newly designated onto that route in 2011.

== Major intersections ==
The entire route is in Owensboro, Daviess County.

mi	km	Destinations	Notes
0.00	0.00	US 231 (Wendell H. Ford Expressway) / US 60 to I-165	Southern terminus, Wendell H. Ford Expressway Exit 16
0.773	1.244	KY 1432 (Burlew Boulevard)	
1.699	2.734	KY 298 (Old Hartford Road)	
2.460	3.959	KY 54 (East Parrish Avenue)	
3.447	5.547	KY 2262 (J.R. Miller Boulevard)	Northern terminus
1.000 mi = 1.609 km; 1.000 km = 0.621 mi
