= Centertown, Kentucky =

- City
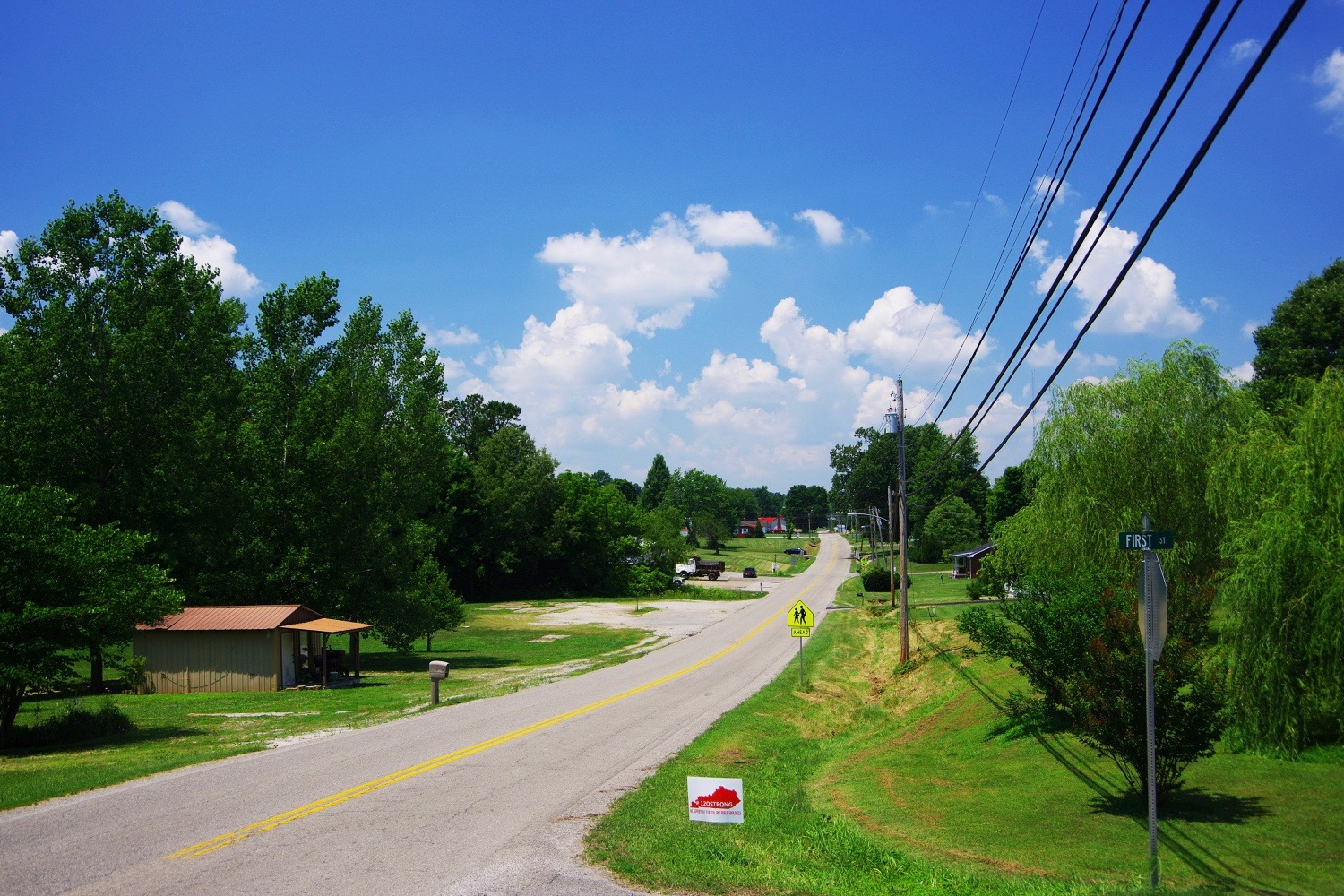
- Main Street (KY 85/KY 69)

- Location of Centertown in Ohio County, Kentucky.
- Coordinates: 37°25′0″N 86°59′43″W
- Country: United States
- State: Kentucky
- County: Ohio

Area
  - Total: 0.31 sq mi (0.81 km^{2})
  - Land: 0.31 sq mi (0.81 km^{2})
  - Water: 0 sq mi (0.00 km^{2})
- Elevation: 443 ft (135 m)

Population (2020)
  - Total: 416
  - Density: 1,329.8/sq mi (513.43/km^{2})
- Time zone: UTC-6 (Central (CST))
  - Summer (DST): UTC-5 (CDT)
- ZIP code: 42328
- Area code: 270
- FIPS code: 21-13870
- GNIS feature ID: 0489277

Centertown is a home rule-class city in Ohio County, Kentucky, in the United States. As of the 2020 census, Centertown had a population of 416.

== History ==
Incorporated in 1890, the city is named for its location between Hartford and the Green River shipping port of Point Pleasant.

== Geography ==
Centertown is located at 37°25′0″N 86°59′43″W (37.416771, -86.995243). The city is concentrated along a merged stretch of Kentucky Routes 69 and 85 northeast of Central City. The two highways converge just west of the city, with KY 85 approaching from Island to the northwest, and diverge just east of the city, with KY 69 continuing eastward to Hartford, and KY 85 veering southward to join US 62 near Rockport.

According to the United States Census Bureau, the city has a total area of 0.3 square miles (0.78 km^{2}), all land.

== Demographics ==
Historical population
Census	Pop.	Note	%±
1890	79		—
1900	201		154.4%
1910	299		48.8%
1920	343		14.7%
1930	285		−16.9%
1940	424		48.8%
1950	370		−12.7%
1960	327		−11.6%
1970	323		−1.2%
1980	462		43.0%
1990	383		−17.1%
2000	416		8.6%
2010	423		1.7%
2020	416		−1.7%
U.S. Decennial Census

As of the census of 2000, there were 416 people, 164 households, and 126 families residing in the city. The population density was 1,357.0 inhabitants per square mile (523.9/km^{2}). There were 181 housing units at an average density of 590.4 per square mile (228.0/km^{2}). The racial makeup of the city was 99.76% White, and 0.24% from two or more races. Hispanic or Latino of any race were 1.68% of the population.

There were 164 households, out of which 31.1% had children under the age of 18 living with them, 59.8% were married couples living together, 14.0% had a female householder with no husband present, and 22.6% were non-families. 18.9% of all households were made up of individuals, and 11.6% had someone living alone who was 65 years of age or older. The average household size was 2.54 and the average family size was 2.88.

In the city, the population was spread out, with 23.6% under the age of 18, 13.0% from 18 to 24, 25.5% from 25 to 44, 23.8% from 45 to 64, and 14.2% who were 65 years of age or older. The median age was 33 years. For every 100 females, there were 102.9 males. For every 100 females age 18 and over, there were 98.8 males.

The median income for a household in the city was $31,250, and the median income for a family was $37,946. Males had a median income of $22,500 versus $18,750 for females. The per capita income for the city was $13,018. About 15.4% of families and 17.0% of the population were below the poverty line, including 27.5% of those under age 18 and 13.5% of those age 65 or over.
