= William H. Natcher Bridge =

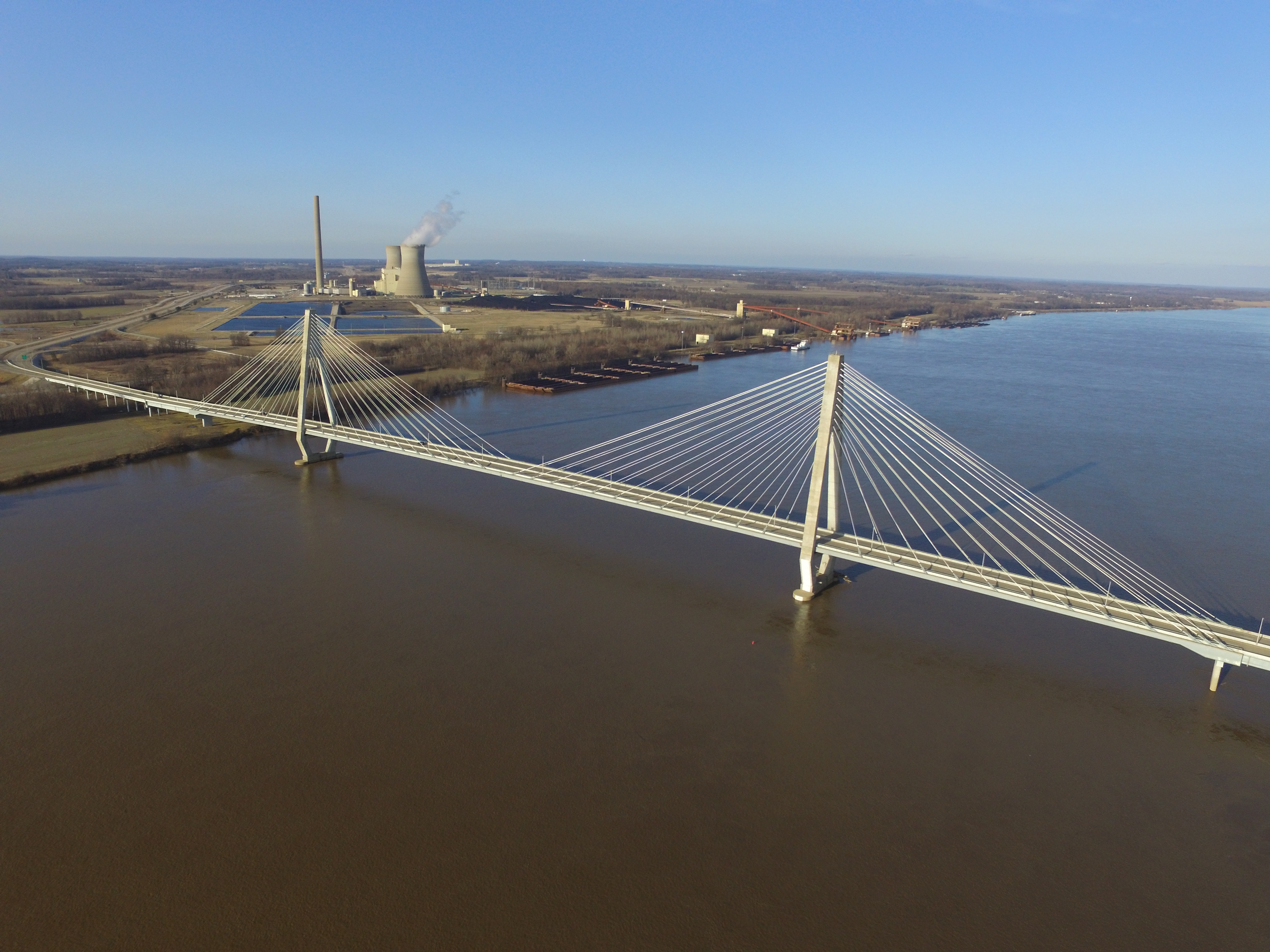
- View of William H. Natcher Bridge with the Rockport Generating Station in the distance.
- Coordinates: 37.901172°N 87.033933°W
- Carries: 4 lanes of US 231
- Crosses: Ohio River; SR 66
- Locale: Maceo, Kentucky to Rockport, Indiana
- Maintained by: Kentucky Transportation Cabinet (KYTC)

Characteristics
- Total length: 4,505 feet (1,373 m)
- Width: 67 feet (20 m)
- Longest span: 1,200 feet (366 m)

History
- Opened: October 21, 2002

Location
- Interactive map of William H. Natcher Bridge

The William H. Natcher Bridge is a cable-stayed bridge that carries U.S. Highway 231 over the Ohio River. The bridge connects Owensboro, Kentucky to Rockport, Indiana and opened on October 21, 2002. It is named in honor of William Huston Natcher, a former United States Representative who served Kentucky's 2nd Congressional District from 1954 until his death in 1994. The bridge project was named for Natcher only three months before his death. It is owned by the Commonwealth of Kentucky and was commissioned by the Kentucky Transportation Cabinet, in cooperation with the Indiana Department of Transportation and the Federal Highway Administration.

== Specifications ==
The William H. Natcher Bridge is 4,505 feet (1,373 m) in length (including its approaches) and 67 feet (20 m) wide. It is supported by cables connected to two identical diamond-shaped towers, each 374 feet (114 m) tall. At the time of its construction, it was the United States' longest cable-supported bridge over an inland waterway.

== Construction ==
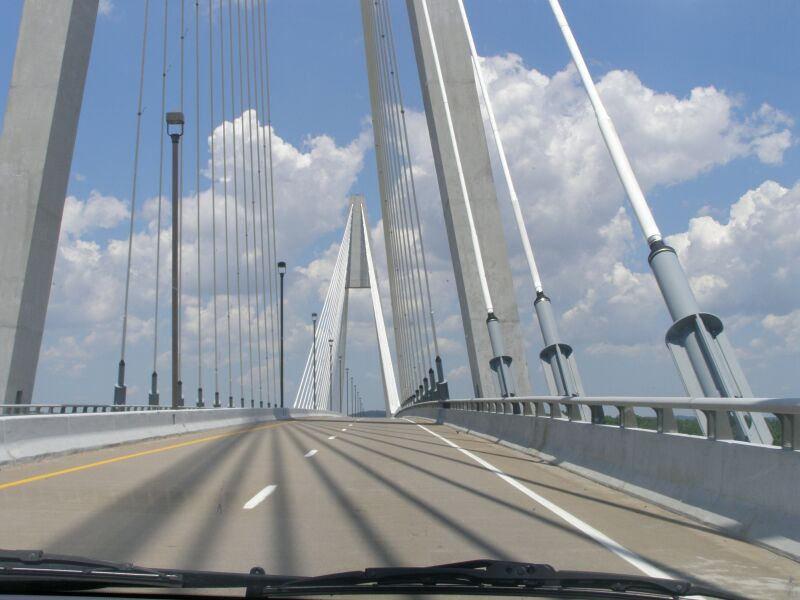
Northbound at the main span.

The concept for a new bridge to serve Owensboro dates back to 1987, when a Green River Area Development District study recommended a new bridge to connect to U.S. Highway 231 in Rockport, where the highway separated from Indiana State Road 66 mere feet away from the river's bank. Congressman Natcher first began seeking federal funds for the new bridge in 1988. Construction ran across the late 1990s and early 2000s at a cost of US$70 million (approximately $40 million from federal sources, $30 million from state sources). Originally slated for a 1996 completion, the bridge was the victim of numerous funding delays from both the federal and state levels. Though the concrete piers (the bases which support the upright towers) were installed in 1995, construction on the bridge itself did not begin until 1998. Even then, the original plan was to have the bridge completed by the end of 2000, but the builders said that goal was unrealistic due to the complicated nature of the cable installation. It was finally dedicated on August 16, 2002, but did not open to traffic until October 21, 2002. The Natcher Bridge was designed by Parsons, Brinckerhoff, Quade & Douglas, Inc. and built by Traylor Brothers of Evansville.

== Reasons for building ==
The bridge was constructed for two reasons: to relieve traffic congestion on the aging Owensboro Bridge in downtown Owensboro (approximately 6 miles downstream from the Natcher Bridge), and as part of a larger project to make U.S. Highway 231 a four-lane road between Owensboro and Interstate 64 near Dale, Indiana. The U.S. 231 connection to I-64 in Indiana fully opened to traffic on March 15, 2011.

== Effects of bridge ==
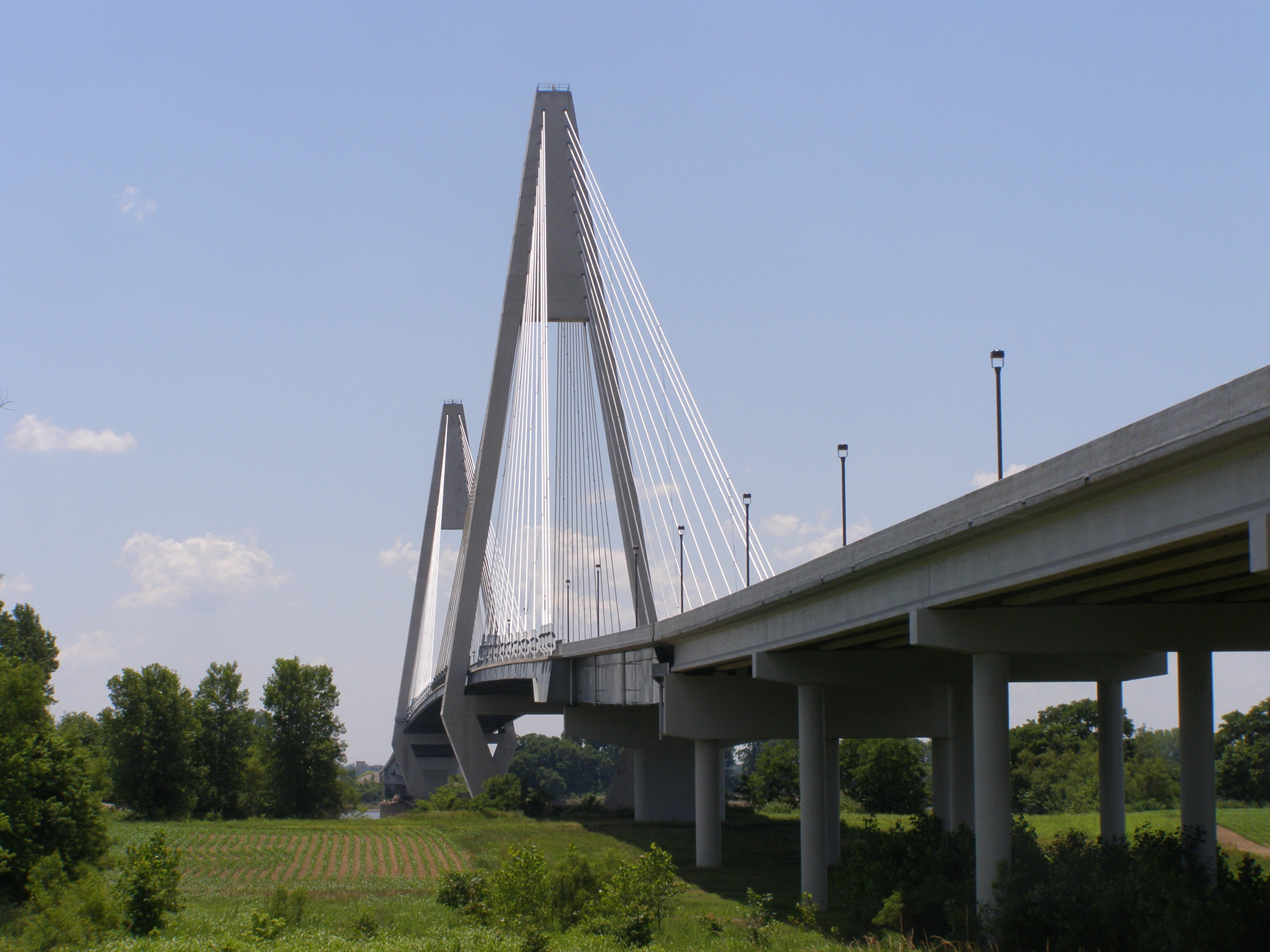
Indiana approach

A new four-lane expressway, from U.S. Route 60 near Owensboro to the Natcher Bridge was constructed. Upon the completion of the bridge, U.S. Route 231 was rerouted onto the new four-lane highway and around Owensboro, Kentucky. U.S. Route 231 in the city of Owensboro was renumbered to Kentucky Route 2155 and in Indiana from the old Owensboro Bridge to the Indiana four-lane expressway approach, old U.S. Route 231 was renumbered to State Road 161.

In 2014, the Kentucky Transportation Cabinet extended the US 60 By-Pass (also known as the Wendell H. Ford Expressway) eastward from just north of the Kentucky Route 54 interchange to the junction of U.S. 60/231 and Kentucky Route 2830 between Owensboro and Maceo, Kentucky. This project, in tandem with the Natcher Bridge and Indiana's expansion of U.S. 231 to four lanes from the Ohio River to Interstate 64, will create an almost non-stop, high-speed route from I-64 near Dale, Indiana to Interstate 65 in Bowling Green, Kentucky, allowing a bypass of Louisville, Kentucky.

== See also ==
- List of crossings of the Ohio River
