= Rock Hill, Indiana =

- Unincorporated community
- Location within Indiana Location within the United States
- Coordinates: 37°56′42″N 87°02′24″W
- Country: United States
- State: Indiana
- County: Spencer
- Township: Ohio
- Elevation: 387 ft (118 m)
- Time zone: UTC-6 (Central (CST))
  - Summer (DST): UTC-5 (CDT)
- ZIP code: 47635
- Area codes: 812, 930
- GNIS feature ID: 442201

Rock Hill is an unincorporated community in Ohio Township, Spencer County, Indiana, United States.

== History ==
The community took its name from a nearby rock formation.

Ellwood Cubberley, an American educator and eugenicist, began his teaching career in Rock Hill's one room schoolhouse in the 19th century.

The Rock Hill school operated until 1923. Thereafter, students attended school in Silverdale, Indiana.

== Geography ==
Rock Hill is located at 37°56′42″N 87°02′24″W.
