= Kentucky Route 54 =

State highway in Kentucky, United States

Kentucky Route 54
- KY 54 highlighted in red

Route information
- Maintained by KYTC
- Length: 54.329 mi (87.434 km)

Major junctions
- West end: KY 2831 in Owensboro
- US 60 / US 231 in Owensboro
- East end: US 62 / KY 259 in Leitchfield

Location
- Country: United States
- State: Kentucky
- Counties: Daviess, Ohio, Grayson

Highway system
- Kentucky State Highway System; Interstate; US; State; Parkways
| ← KY 53 | → KY 55 |

Kentucky Route 54 (KY 54) is a 54.329-mile-long (87.434 km) state highway in the U.S. state of Kentucky.

== Route Description ==
The highway, which begins at the intersection of Frederica Street and Parrish Avenue in Owensboro, which is also its junction with Kentucky Route 81 and Kentucky Route 2831 (formerly US 431), begins to follow East Parrish Avenue. With its southeasterly course through Daviess, northeastern Ohio, and northwestern Grayson Counties, KY 54 connects Owensboro to Leitchfield, while also serving the smaller communities of Philpot, Whitesville and Fordsville.

From Leitchfield Road to Kentucky Route 1456 (also known as Thruston-Dermont Road and Millers Mill Road), the highway is five lanes wide and serves as the backbone of the growing retail and service area which has grown up in the area surrounding the highway's interchange with the Wendell H. Ford Expressway (US 60 and US 231). Where between KY 2831 and KY 1456, KY 54 is designated as a state primary road.

Not only does the road's number equal its rounded mileage, each of the three counties through which it passes (Daviess, Ohio and Grayson) have 18 of the 54 miles.

== History ==
=== Early years ===
Initially, KY 54 also ran a course from US 41/60 in downtown Henderson to its present-day western terminus in Owensboro via Hebbardsville and Sorgho, and crossing the Green River via a tolled ferry. This alignment included a brief concurrency with KY 81, and a traversal through downtown Owensboro. By 1980, the Henderson County portion of the KY 54 designation was replaced by parts of KY 351 and KY 416 west and east of Hebbardsville, respectively, while the Daviess County portion from the ferry site to Sorgho was mostly transferred to the Daviess County Road Department, with a small portion of that alignment became KY 1554 from the Audubon Parkway interchange to the current KY 56. This event also extended KY 56 to its eastern terminus at a junction with KY 81. Today, KY 81 has its northern terminus at KY 54's current western terminus at a junction with KY 2831 (formerly US 431).

At one time, KY 54 traversed the Yeaman community in northwestern Grayson County. KY 54 was rerouted to bypass that area by 1949.

=== Recent developments ===
In Owensboro proper, the route has over the years been straightened and widened, particularly toward the eastern reaches of the city.

== Major intersections ==
| County | Location | mi | km | Destinations | Notes |
|---|---|---|---|---|---|
| Daviess | Owensboro | 0.000 | 0.000 | KY 81 south (West Parish Avenue) / KY 2831 (Frederica Street) | Western terminus; northern terminus of KY 81 |
| Daviess | Owensboro | 0.260 | 0.418 | KY 2262 north (J.R. Miller Boulevard) | Southern terminus of KY 2262 |
| Daviess | Owensboro | 0.514 | 0.827 | KY 2155 south (Triplett Street) | |
| Daviess | Owensboro | 0.776 | 1.249 | KY 2155 north (Breckenridge Street) | |
| Daviess | Owensboro | 2.566 | 4.130 | US 60 / US 231 (Wendell Ford Expressway) to I-165 – Hawesville, Henderson, Nashville | US 60 exit 18 |
| Daviess | Owensboro | 3.318 | 5.340 | KY 3143 south (Fairview Drive) | Northern terminus of KY 3143 |
| Daviess | Dermont | 4.505 | 7.250 | KY 1456 (Thruston Dermont Road / Millers Mill Road) | |
| Daviess | | 6.447 | 10.375 | KY 142 north | West end of KY 142 overlap |
| Daviess | Philpot | 7.492 | 12.057 | KY 142 south – Habit, Philpot | East end of KY 142 overlap |
| Daviess | Whitesville | 15.172 | 24.417 | KY 764 north | West end of KY 764 overlap |
| Daviess | Whitesville | 15.244 | 24.533 | KY 764 south (Main Cross Street) | East end of KY 764 overlap |
| Ohio | | 20.230 | 32.557 | KY 1414 south (Ralph Lane) | Northern terminus of KY 1414 |
| Ohio | | 21.608 | 34.775 | KY 2671 south | Northern terminus of KY 2671 |
| Ohio | | 23.637 | 38.040 | KY 69 north – Hawesville | West end of KY 69 overlap |
| Ohio | Fordsville | 24.666 | 39.696 | KY 1700 north | Southern terminus of KY 1700 |
| Ohio | Fordsville | 25.027 | 40.277 | KY 69 south (Walnut Street) / Ridge Road – Dundee | East end of KY 69 overlap |
| Ohio | Ellmitch | 26.177 | 42.128 | KY 261 north – Hardinsburg | Southern terminus of KY 261 |
| Ohio | | 26.440 | 42.551 | KY 629 north (Fordsville-Askin Road) | Southern terminus of KY 629 |
| Ohio | | 30.127 | 48.485 | KY 919 south | Northern terminus of KY 919 |
| Ohio | Shreve | 32.559 | 52.399 | KY 110 east / Pattiville Loop | Western terminus of KY 110 |
| Grayson | | 36.502 | 58.744 | KY 878 west (Olaton Road) | Eastern terminus of KY 878 |
| Grayson | | 37.054 | 59.633 | KY 736 south (Yeaman Road) | West end of KY 736 overlap |
| Grayson | | 37.386 | 60.167 | KY 736 north (Lone Hill Road) | East end of KY 736 overlap |
| Grayson | Short Creek | 43.484 | 69.981 | KY 79 (Falls of Rough Road) to Western Kentucky Parkway – Hardinsburg, Caneyville, Rough River Dam State Resort Park | |
| Grayson | | | | KY 631 east (Concord Road) | |
| Grayson | | | | KY 631 west (Duff Road) | |
| Grayson | | 48.706 | 78.385 | KY 2804 west | Eastern terminus of KY 2804 |
| Grayson | | 50.679 | 81.560 | KY 2193 south (Kefaufer Road) | Northern terminus of KY 2193 |
| Grayson | | 51.398 | 82.717 | KY 2777 south (Ray Priddy Road) | Northern terminus of KY 2777 |
| Grayson | Leitchfield | 54.329 | 87.434 | US 62 / KY 259 (Main Street) to Western Kentucky Parkway | traffic circle (Public Square) around Grayson County Courthouse |
1.000 mi = 1.609 km; 1.000 km = 0.621 mi: Concurrency terminus
