= Johnny Morrison (baseball) =

American baseball player (1895–1966)

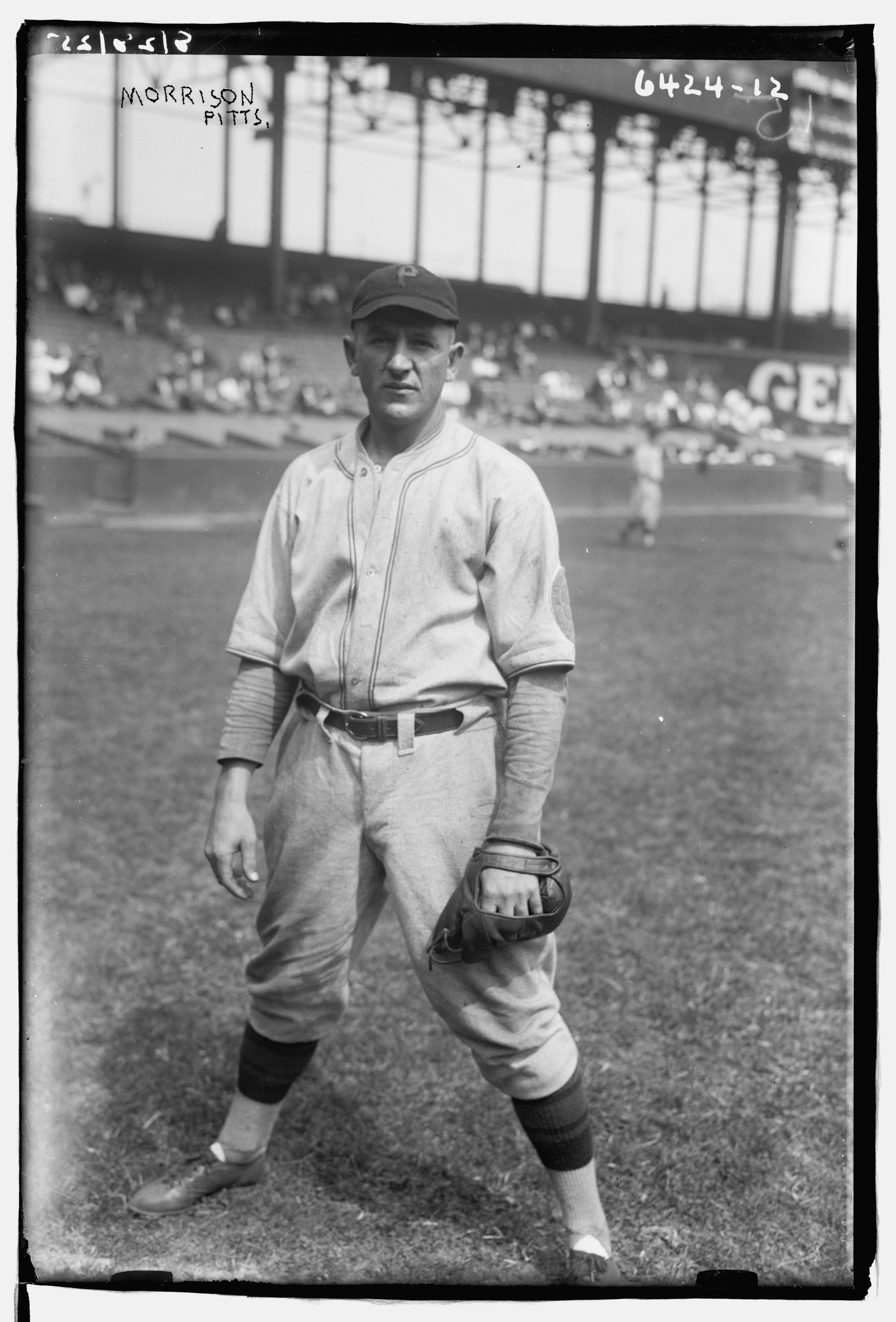
- Pitcher
- Born: October 22, 1895; Pellville, Kentucky, U.S.
- Died: March 20, 1966 (aged 70); Louisville, Kentucky, U.S.
- Batted: Right Threw: Right

MLB debut
- September 28, 1920, for the Pittsburgh Pirates

Last MLB appearance
- June 19, 1930, for the Brooklyn Robins

MLB statistics
- Win–loss record: 103–80
- Earned run average: 3.65
- Strikeouts: 546
- Stats at Baseball Reference

Teams
- Pittsburgh Pirates (1920–1927); Brooklyn Robins (1929–1930)

Career highlights and awards
- World Series champion (1925)

John Dewey Morrison (October 22, 1895 – March 20, 1966), nicknamed "Jughandle Johnny", was an American professional baseball player. He was a right-handed pitcher over parts of ten seasons (1920–1927, 1929–1930) with the Pittsburgh Pirates and Brooklyn Robins. For his career, he compiled a 103–80 record in 297 appearances, with a 3.65 earned run average and 546 strikeouts. May was a member of the 1925 World Series champion Pirates, pitching three times during their seven-game defeat of the Washington Senators. In World Series play, he recorded no decisions in 3 appearances, with a 2.89 earned run average and 7 strikeouts.

Morrison was born in Pellville, Kentucky, and later died in Louisville, Kentucky, at the age of 70, and was buried at Rosehill Elmwood Cemetery. His son, Dwane Morrison, was a college basketball coach, most notably at Georgia Tech.

== See also ==
- List of Major League Baseball annual saves leaders
