= Kentucky Route 69 =

State highway in Kentucky, United States

Kentucky Route 69
- KY 69 highlighted in red

Route information
- Maintained by KYTC
- Length: 55.423 mi (89.195 km)

Major junctions
- South end: Bluff Lane in rural Ohio County
- US 231 in Hartford; I-165 in Hartford; US 60 near Hawesville
- North end: SR 237 at Kentucky-Indiana state line

Location
- Country: United States
- State: Kentucky
- Counties: Ohio, Hancock

Highway system
- Kentucky State Highway System; Interstate; US; State; Parkways
← I-69	→ KY 70

Kentucky Route 69 (KY 69) is a 55.423-mile-long (89.195 km) state highway that traverses Ohio and Hancock Counties in northwestern Kentucky.

== Route description ==
KY 69 runs from Bluff Lane in rural Ohio County to Indiana State Road 237 on the Bob Cummings – Lincoln Trail Bridge at the Kentucky–Indiana state line near Hawesville via the cities of Centertown, Hartford, Dundee, Fordsville, and Hawesville.

== History ==
KY 69 was once connected with a junction with KY 277 just northeast of Central City, in Muhlenberg County through a ferry on the Green River. Ferry service was discontinued sometime before 1970.

KY 69 also once connected to Cannelton, Indiana from Hawesville via a ferry on the Ohio River. This ferry was replaced with the Lincoln Trail Bridge when it opened to traffic in 1966.

== Major intersections ==
County	Location	mi	km	Destinations	Notes
Ohio		0.000	0.000	Bluff Lane	Southern terminus
Ohio		6.719	10.813	KY 85 west	South end of KY 85 overlap
Ohio		7.556	12.160	KY 85 east	North end of KY 85 overlap
Ohio		11.301	18.187	KY 273 east (Goshen Road)	Western terminus of KY 273
Ohio	Hartford	13.672	22.003	US 231 north / KY 1543 east (East Union Street)	South end of US 231 overlap; Western terminus of KY 1543
Ohio	Hartford	14.689	23.640	US 231 south – Beaver Dam	North end of US 231 overlap
Ohio	Hartford	15.311	24.641	KY 1543 (Clay Street)	
Ohio	Hartford	16.018	25.778	I-165 – Owensboro, Bowling Green	I-165 exit 47
Ohio		16.303	26.237	KY 6122 (Barnetts Station Road)	Southern terminus of KY 6122
Ohio		16.376	26.355	KY 6121 (Country Club Lane)	Northern terminus of KY 6121
Ohio		17.852	28.730	KY 1164 east (Cedar Grove Road)	Western terminus of KY 1164
Ohio		25.048	40.311	KY 878 east	Western terminus of KY 878
Ohio	Fordsville	32.640	52.529	KY 54 east (Main Street) – Leitchfield	South end of KY 54 overlap
Ohio		34.030	54.766	KY 54 west – Owensboro	North end of KY 54 overlap
Hancock	Weberstown	44.373	71.411	KY 144 – Owensboro	
Hancock		52.562	84.590	KY 1265 south (Happy Hollow Road)	Northern terminus of KY 1265
Hancock		52.826	85.015	US 60 east	South end of US 60 overlap
Hancock	Hawesville			KY 3199 east (Indian Lake Drive)	Western terminus of KY 3199
Hancock	Hawesville			KY 2181 south (Pellville Street)	Northern terminus of KY 2181
Hancock	Hawesville	54.366	87.494	US 60 west / KY 1389 west (Madison Street)	North end of US 60 overlap; eastern terminus of KY 1389
Hancock	Hawesville	54.764	88.134	KY 3101 south (Main Street) to US 60 west – Owensboro	Northern terminus of KY 3101
Hancock	Hawesville	55.423	89.195	SR 237 north to I-64	Indiana state line (Lincoln Trail Bridge over Ohio River)
1.000 mi = 1.609 km; 1.000 km = 0.621 mi
