= Kentucky Route 298 =

State Highway

Kentucky Route 298
- KY 298 highlighted in red

Route information
- Maintained by KYTC
- Length: 10.432 mi (16.789 km)

Major junctions
- South end: US 431 near Owensboro
- US 231 near Owensboro
- North end: KY 2155 in Owensboro

Location
- Country: United States
- State: Kentucky
- Counties: Daviess

Highway system
- Kentucky State Highway System; Interstate; US; State; Parkways
| ← KY 297 | → KY 299 |

Kentucky Route 298 (KY 298) is a 10.432-mile-long (16.789 km) state highway in Daviess County, Kentucky, that runs from U.S. Route 431 (US 431) and Sharp Road south of Owensboro to southbound KY 2155 and Old Hartford Road in southeastern Owensboro.

== History ==
KY 298 was formed by 1957.

The original KY 298 ran from KY 20 in Constance westward by the Ohio River; this became part of KY 8 (which also replaced part of KY 20) when it was extended west from Covington.

== Major intersections ==
The entire route is in Daviess County.

| Location | mi | km | Destinations | Notes |
|---|---|---|---|---|
| | 0.000 | 0.000 | US 431 / Sharp Road | Southern terminus; continues beyond US 431 as Sharp Road |
| | 5.261 | 8.467 | US 231 south | Southern end of US 231 concurrency |
| | 5.458 | 8.784 | US 231 north (New Hartford Road) | Northern end of US 231 concurrency |
| | 6.787 | 10.923 | KY 1456 north (Newbolt Road) | Southern terminus of KY 1456 |
| Owensboro | 8.012 | 12.894 | KY 3143 (Foors Lane / Fairview Drive) | |
| Owensboro | 8.304 | 13.364 | KY 2117 west (Southeastern Parkway) / Southeastern Parkway | Eastern terminus of KY 2117 |
| Owensboro | 9.228 | 14.851 | KY 1432 west (Burlew Boulevard) | Eastern terminus of KY 1432 |
| Owensboro | 10.169 | 16.365 | KY 2155 north (Breckinridge Street) | No left turn northbound and no right turn southbound |
| Owensboro | 10.432 | 16.789 | KY 2155 south (Triplett Street) / Old Hartford Road | Northern terminus; no right turn northbound; continues beyond KY 2155 south as Old Hartford Road |
1.000 mi = 1.609 km; 1.000 km = 0.621 mi
