= Patronville, Indiana =

- Unincorporated community
- Location within Indiana Location within the United States
- Coordinates: 37°51′30″N 87°06′38″W
- Country: United States
- State: Indiana
- County: Spencer
- Township: Ohio
- Elevation: 440 ft (134 m)
- Time zone: UTC-6 (Central (CST))
  - Summer (DST): UTC-5 (CDT)
- ZIP code: 47635
- Area codes: 812, 930
- GNIS feature ID: 440930

Patronville is an unincorporated community in Ohio Township, Spencer County, in the U.S. state of Indiana.

It is located directly north of Owensboro, Kentucky via the Glover Cary Bridge.

== History ==
A post office was established at Patronville in 1875, and remained in operation until it was discontinued in 1904. Edward P. Harrison was an early postmaster.

== Geography ==
Patronville is located at 37°51′30″N 87°06′38″W.
