= Kentucky Route 81 =

State highway in Kentucky, United States

Kentucky Route 81
- KY 81 highlighted in red

Route information
- Maintained by KYTC
- Length: 39.961 mi (64.311 km)

Major junctions
- South end: US 431 in South Carrollton
- US 60 near Owensboro
- North end: KY 2831 / KY 54 in Owensboro

Location
- Country: United States
- State: Kentucky
- Counties: Muhlenberg, McLean, Daviess

Highway system
- Kentucky State Highway System; Interstate; US; State; Parkways
← KY 80	→ KY 82

Kentucky Route 81 is a 39.961-mile (64.331 km) state highway in Kentucky that runs from U.S. Route 431 in South Carrollton to Kentucky Route 2831 and Kentucky Route 81 in Owensboro via Bremen, Sacramento, Rumsey, and Calhoun.

== Major intersections ==
County	Location	mi	km	Destinations	Notes
Muhlenberg	South Carrollton	0.000	0.000	US 431 – Central City	Southern terminus
Muhlenberg		2.207	3.552	KY 2584 south (Gishton Road)	Northern terminus of KY 2584
Muhlenberg		5.829	9.381	KY 175 south	South end of KY 175 overlap
Muhlenberg		6.029	9.703	KY 175 north	North end of KY 175 overlap
Muhlenberg		7.310	11.764	KY 181 south – Greenville	Northern terminus of KY 181
McLean		8.894	14.314	KY 85 west	South end of KY 85 overlap
McLean	Sacramento	9.672	15.566	KY 254 west (West Second Street)	Eastern terminus of KY 254
McLean	Sacramento	9.949	16.011	KY 85 east	North end of KY 85 overlap
McLean		10.395	16.729	KY 2383 south (Bibb Road)	Northern terminus of KY 2383
McLean		11.049	17.782	KY 2109 south (Station Road)	Northern terminus of KY 2109
McLean		13.658	21.980	KY 2226 east	Western terminus of KY 2226
McLean		14.172	22.808	KY 1589 north	Southern terminus of KY 1589
McLean	Semiway	14.463	23.276	KY 2385 west	Eastern terminus of KY 2385
McLean	Rumsey	18.422	29.647	KY 138 east	South end of KY 138 overlap
McLean	Rumsey	18.497	29.768	KY 138 west to Pennyrile Parkway	North end of KY 138 overlap
McLean	Calhoun			Calhoun-Rumsey Bridge over Green River	
McLean	Calhoun	19.279	31.027	KY 256 west (Main Street)	Eastern terminus of KY 256
McLean	Calhoun	19.961	32.124	KY 136 to Pennyrile Parkway	
McLean		20.316	32.695	KY 815 north	Southern terminus of KY 815
McLean		24.475	39.389	KY 3470 north	Southern terminus of KY 3470
McLean	Glenville	25.220	40.588	KY 140 (Old Glenville Loop)	
Daviess		26.930	43.340	KY 1514 west (Greenback Road)	Eastern terminus of KY 1514
Daviess		27.970	45.013	KY 1207 east	Western terminus of KY 1207
Daviess		29.125	46.872	KY 554 south	South end of KY 554 overlap
Daviess	Moseleyville	29.938	48.181	KY 554 north	North end of KY 554 overlap
Daviess		36.504	58.747	KY 56 west (West Parrish Avenue) – Beech Grove	roundabout
Daviess		37.184	59.842	KY 2118 south (Airport Road) – Owensboro Daviess County Regional Airport	Northern terminus of KY 2118
Daviess		37.359	60.123	US 60 to Audubon Parkway	US 60 exit 11
Daviess	Owensboro	38.090	61.300	KY 2698 south (Carter Road)	Northern terminus of KY 2698
Daviess	Owensboro	39.961	64.311	KY 54 east (West Parrish Avenue) / KY 2831 (Frederica Street)	
1.000 mi = 1.609 km; 1.000 km = 0.621 mi
