= Kentucky Route 2121 =

Highway in Kentucky, USA

Kentucky Route 2121
- KY 2121 highlighted in red

Route information
- Maintained by KYTC
- Length: 1.780 mi (2.865 km)

Major junctions
- East end: KY 2698 in Owensboro
- West end: US 431 in Owensboro

Location
- Country: United States
- State: Kentucky
- Counties: Daviess

Highway system
- Kentucky State Highway System; Interstate; US; State; Parkways
← KY 2120	→ KY 2122

Kentucky Route 2121 (KY 2121) is a 1.780-mile-long (2.865 km) state highway in Owensboro that begins at a junction with KY 2698 following Southtown Boulevard. It goes next to KY 2127 (Todd Bridge Road). It makes its way to a junction with KY 2699 (Goetz Drive). The highway ends at U.S. Route 431 (US 431).

== Major intersections ==
The entire route is in Owensboro, Daviess County.

mi	km	Destinations	Notes
0.000	0.000	KY 2698	Western terminus, road continues as Southtown Boulevard
0.749	1.205	KY 2127 south (Todd Bridge Road)	Northern terminus of KY 2127
1.351	2.174	KY 2699 north (Goetz Road)	Southern terminus of KY 2699
1.780	2.865	US 431	Eastern terminus, road continues as Southtown Boulevard
