= Kentucky Route 331 =

State highway in Kentucky, United States

Kentucky Route 331
- KY 331 highlighted in red

Route information
- Maintained by KYTC
- Length: 3.1 mi (5.0 km)

Major junctions
- South end: US 60 in Owensboro
- North end: Griffith Station Road / Lower River Road in Owensboro

Location
- Country: United States
- State: Kentucky
- Counties: Daviess

Highway system
- Kentucky State Highway System; Interstate; US; State; Parkways
← KY 330	→ KY 332

Kentucky Route 331 (KY 331) is a 3.1-mile-long (5.0 km) state highway in the U.S. state of Kentucky. The highway travels through northwestern parts of Owensboro, within Daviess County.

== Route description ==
KY 331 begins at an intersection with U.S. Route 60 (US 60) in the northwestern part of Owensboro, within Daviess County. It travels to the east-southeast, along the northern edge of Joe Ford Nature Park, and turns to the north-northwest. At this point, it temporarily leaves the city limits of Owensboro. When it re-enters the city, it is just west of the Thompson–Berry Park. The highway again leaves the city and curves to the north-northeast. When it re-enters the city, it curves to the east-southeast and begins to curve back to the north-northwest. It leaves the city one final time for a very brief distance. After the highway re-enters the city, it curves to the northwest and begins to parallel some railroad tracks of CSX. Just after the highway curves back to the north-northwest, it intersects the eastern terminus of both Griffith Station Road and Lower River Road and meets its northern terminus.

== Major intersections ==
The entire route is in Owensboro, Daviess County.

mi	km	Destinations	Notes
0.0	0.0	US 60 to Audubon Parkway / I-165 – Henderson, Hardinsburg	Southern terminus
3.1	5.0	Griffith Station Road west / Lower River Road west	Northern terminus
1.000 mi = 1.609 km; 1.000 km = 0.621 mi
