= Lincoln Trail Bridge =

Bob Cummings Lincoln Trail Bridge
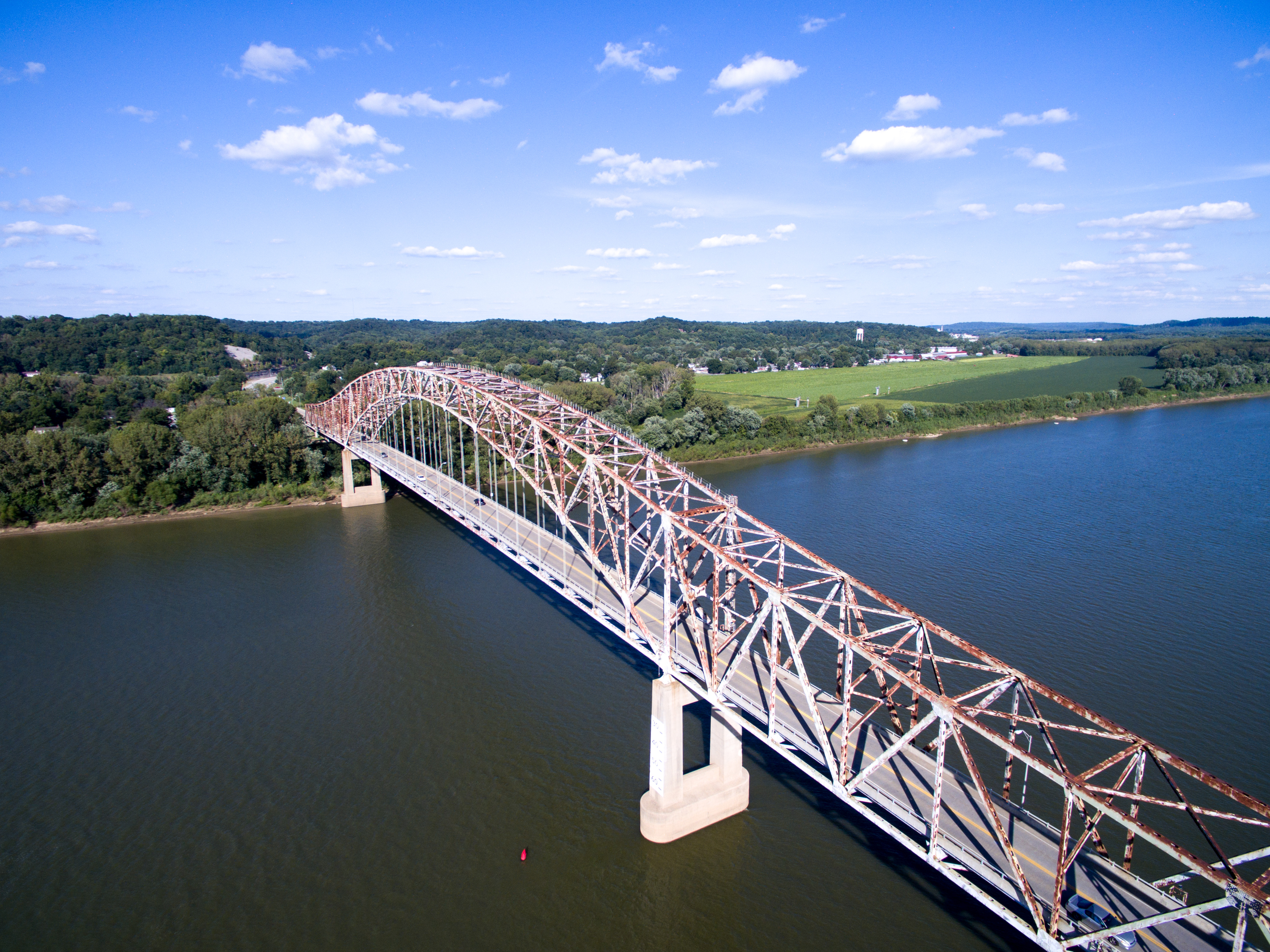
- View from Hawesville, Kentucky
- Coordinates: 37°54′12″N 86°44′38″W
- Carries: 2 lanes of SR 237 / KY 69
- Crosses: Ohio River
- Locale: Cannelton, Indiana and Hawesville, Kentucky
- Official name: Bob Cummings Lincoln Trail Bridge
- Maintained by: Indiana Department of Transportation

Characteristics
- Design: Through arch bridge with suspended deck
- Total length: 2,708.3 feet (825.5 m)
- Width: 27.8 feet (8.5 m)
- Longest span: 824.6 feet (251.3 m)

History
- Opened: 1966

Location
- Interactive map of Bob Cummings Lincoln Trail Bridge

The Bob Cummings Lincoln Trail Bridge is a road bridge that crosses the Ohio River. itconnects the towns of Cannelton, Indiana and Hawesville, Kentucky. Indiana State Road 237 becomes Kentucky Route 69 upon entering Hawesville.

Construction began in June 1964 and the bridge opened on December 21, 1966. The steel arch bridge with its suspended deck was a toll facility until the state of Indiana lifted the tolls in the 1990s.

Bob Cummings, for whom the bridge was named on November 17, 1974, was the editor of the Cannelton News and a booster of Cannelton in general until his death on July 25, 1971.

== New connections ==
To the north, the bridge connects to a rerouted five-mile stretch of Indiana 237, which now by-passes Cannelton and dramatically cuts the time of travel to Indiana 37, which is the primary link to Interstate 64 for both Perry County as well as Hancock County, Kentucky.

In Hawesville, Kentucky 69 takes a sharp westward turn into the downtown area before reaching a traffic signal at the junction of Kentucky 3101. The Kentucky Transportation Cabinet is studying a direct route for Kentucky 69 that would eliminate the sharp turns and steep hill leading from the downtown area to U.S. Highway 60, which connects Hawesville to the city of Owensboro and, to the east, the Fort Knox area.
