= Maceo, Kentucky =

Unincorporated community in Kentucky, United States

- Census-designated place
- Location within Kentucky
- Coordinates: 37°51′50″N 86°59′38″W
- Country: United States
- State: Kentucky
- County: Daviess

Area
  - Total: 1.49 sq mi (3.85 km^{2})
  - Land: 1.49 sq mi (3.85 km^{2})
  - Water: 0 sq mi (0.00 km^{2})
- Elevation: 390 ft (120 m)

Population (2020)
  - Total: 404
  - Density: 272/sq mi (104.9/km^{2})
- Time zone: UTC-6 (Central (CST))
  - Summer (DST): UTC-5 (CDT)
- ZIP code: 42355
- Area codes: 270 & 364
- GNIS feature ID: 497423

Maceo is an unincorporated community and census-designated place (CDP) in Daviess County, Kentucky, United States. As of the 2020 census, the population was 404, down from the 2010 census population of 413.

== History ==
The community was founded by freed slaves just after the U.S. Civil War. In 1890, the Louisville, Henderson & St. Louis Railroad company set up a station and post office there named Powers Station, Kentucky, after Col. J.D. Powers. This name was often confused with another post office named Powers Store, Kentucky. At the suggestion of Post Master Edwin P. Taylor, the post office was renamed to honor Cuban General Antonio Maceo Grajales in 1897.

== Geography ==
Maceo is located in northeastern Daviess County at the junction of Kentucky Route 2830 and Kentucky Route 405, near U.S. Route 60, 9 miles (14 km) northeast of Owensboro. U.S. Route 231 diverges from US 60 at Maceo, leading north to cross the Ohio River into Indiana on the William H. Natcher Bridge, which opened in 2002. Maceo has two cemeteries called Kelly Cemetery and Iron Ore Hill Cemetery and a post office with ZIP code 42355.

According to the U.S. Census Bureau, the Maceo CDP has an area of 1.49 square miles (3.85 km^{2}), all land.

== Demographics ==
Historical population
Census	Pop.	Note	%±
2010	413		—
2020	404		−2.2%
U.S. Decennial Census

== Notable people ==
Maceo is the hometown of country singer Marty Brown and Keith Payne, the author of The Broken Ladder: How Inequality Affects the Way We Think, Live, and Die.
