= Reo, Indiana =

- Census-designated place
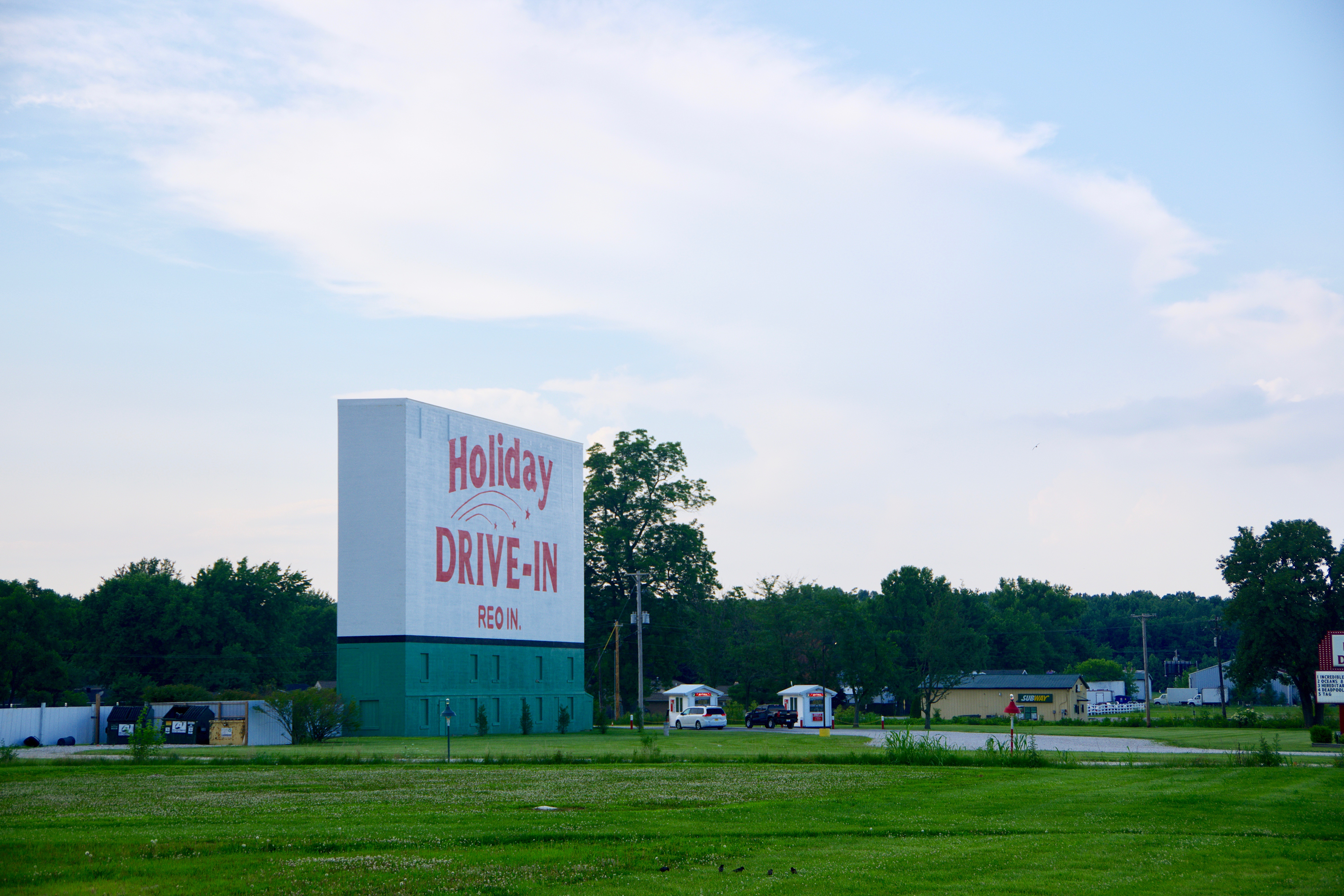
- The Holiday Drive-In in Reo

- Location within Indiana Location within the United States
- Coordinates: 37°54′15″N 87°07′05″W
- Country: United States
- State: Indiana
- County: Spencer
- Township: Ohio
- Elevation: 410 ft (120 m)
- Time zone: UTC-6 (Central (CST))
  - Summer (DST): UTC-5 (CDT)
- ZIP code: 47635
- Area codes: 812, 930
- GNIS feature ID: 2830538

Reo is an unincorporated community and census-designated place in Ohio Township, Spencer County, in the U.S. state of Indiana.

The name Reo was coined in 1966 as an acronym of three nearby larger cities: Rockport, Indiana, Evansville, Indiana, and Owensboro, Kentucky.

== Education ==
South Spencer High School and South Spencer Middle School are located in Reo.

== Geography ==
Reo is concentrated around the intersection of State Road 66 and State Road 161, a few miles northwest of the Ohio River.

== Demographics ==
The United States Census Bureau defined Reo as a census designated place in the 2022 American Community Survey.
