= Bremen, Kentucky =

- City
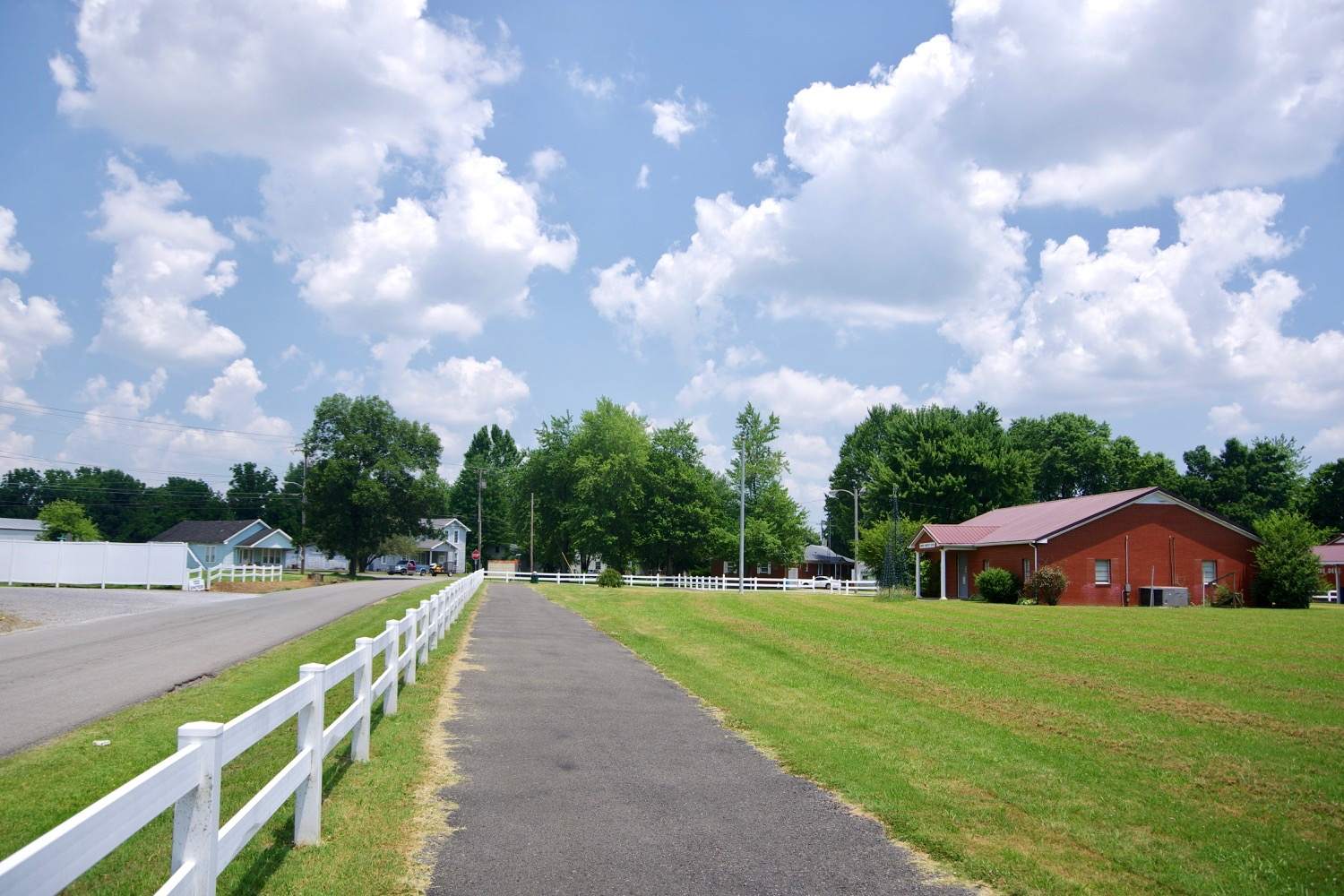
- Walking trail and community center in Bremen

- Location of Bremen in Muhlenberg County, Kentucky.
- Coordinates: 37°21′48″N 87°13′3″W
- Country: United States
- State: Kentucky
- County: Muhlenberg

Area
  - Total: 0.21 sq mi (0.54 km^{2})
  - Land: 0.21 sq mi (0.54 km^{2})
  - Water: 0 sq mi (0.00 km^{2})
- Elevation: 460 ft (140 m)

Population (2020)
  - Total: 172
  - Density: 831.5/sq mi (321.04/km^{2})
- Time zone: UTC-6 (Central (CST))
  - Summer (DST): UTC-5 (CDT)
- ZIP code: 42325
- Area code: 270
- FIPS code: 21-09406
- GNIS feature ID: 0487858

Bremen (/ˈbriːmɪn/) is a home rule-class city in Muhlenberg County, Kentucky, in the United States. The population was 172 at the 2020 census.

== History ==
The city was settled by German immigrants who named it after Bremen, Germany. A post office called Bremen has been in operation since 1832.

=== 2021 tornado ===
In the late hours of December 10, 2021, a violent tornado tore through the town, causing major damage and killing 11 residents. The tornado reached peak intensity before it hit the city. The northern part of the city was destroyed and other areas severely damaged by the high winds. Some of the worst damage in Bremen occurred along Bethlehem Cemetery Road, where a row of four homes were obliterated, with debris scattered and wind-rowed long distances through fields across the street.

== Geography ==
Bremen is located at 37°21′48″N 87°13′3″W (37.363240, -87.217510). The city is situated along Kentucky Route 81 northwest of Central City.

According to the United States Census Bureau, the city has a total area of 0.6 square miles (1.6 km^{2}), all land.

== Demographics ==
Historical population
Census	Pop.	Note	%±
1880	98		—
1900	180		—
1910	254		41.1%
1920	172		−32.3%
1930	255		48.3%
1940	239		−6.3%
1950	410		71.5%
1960	328		−20.0%
1970	299		−8.8%
1980	179		−40.1%
1990	267		49.2%
2000	365		36.7%
2010	197		−46.0%
2020	172		−12.7%
U.S. Decennial Census

As of the census of 2000, there were 365 people, 164 households, and 110 families residing in the city. The population density was 619.1 inhabitants per square mile (239.0/km^{2}). There were 183 housing units at an average density of 310.4 per square mile (119.8/km^{2}). The racial makeup of the city was 98.08% White, and 1.92% from two or more races. Hispanic or Latino of any race were 0.27% of the population.

There were 164 households, out of which 24.4% had children under the age of 18 living with them, 48.2% were married couples living together, 13.4% had a female householder with no husband present, and 32.9% were non-families. 28.7% of all households were made up of individuals, and 16.5% had someone living alone who was 65 years of age or older. The average household size was 2.23 and the average family size was 2.74.

Of the city's population, 20.8% were under the age of 18, 6.3% were aged from 18 to 24, 27.9% from 25 to 44, 24.4% from 45 to 64, and 20.5% were 65 years of age or older. The median age was 43 years. For every 100 females, there were 82.5 males. For every 100 females age 18 and over, there were 84.1 males.

The median income for a household in the city was $31,136, and the median income for a family was $36,094. Males had a median income of $24,712 versus $19,844 for females. The per capita income for the city was $14,959. About 10.6% of families and 10.5% of the population were below the poverty line, including 18.8% of those under age 18 and 7.8% of those age 65 or over.
