= Sacramento, Kentucky =

- City
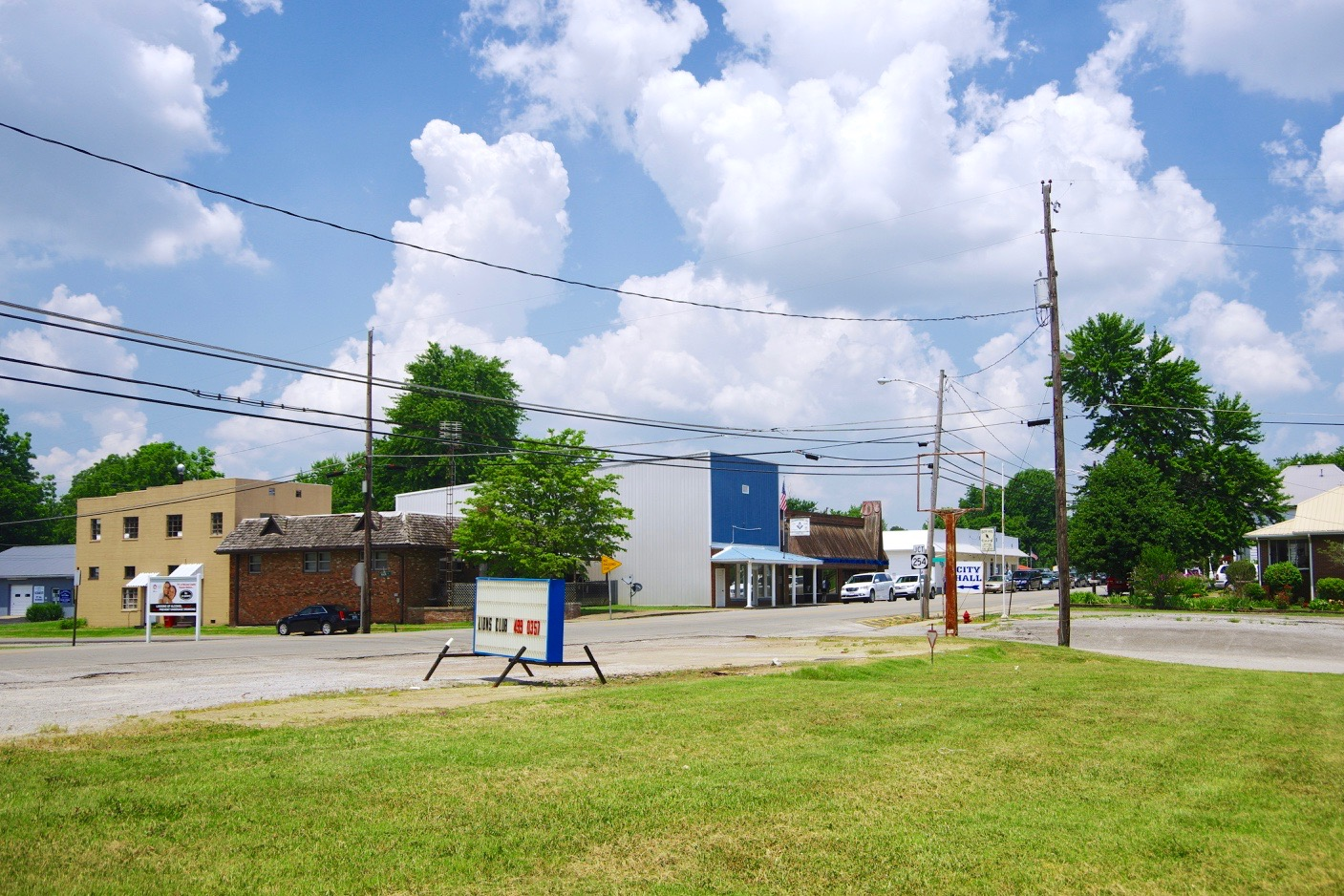
- Sacramento

- Location in McLean County, Kentucky
- Coordinates: 37°24′59″N 87°16′4″W
- Country: United States
- State: Kentucky
- County: McLean
- Incorporated: 1860
- Named for: the California city or river

Area
  - Total: 0.43 sq mi (1.12 km^{2})
  - Land: 0.43 sq mi (1.11 km^{2})
  - Water: 0 sq mi (0.00 km^{2})
- Elevation: 490 ft (150 m)

Population (2020)
  - Total: 429
  - Density: 997.1/sq mi (384.99/km^{2})
- Time zone: UTC-6 (Central (CST))
  - Summer (DST): UTC-5 (CDT)
- ZIP code: 42372
- Area code: 270
- FIPS code: 21-67638
- GNIS feature ID: 0502550
- Website: https://www.cityofsacramentoky.com/

Sacramento is a home rule-class city in McLean County, Kentucky, in the United States. The population was 429 as of the 2020 census. It is included in the Owensboro metropolitan area.

== History ==
=== Early history ===
The first community at the site was known as "Crossroads", but the post office established in 1852 was named "Social Hill". In 1854, George L. Helm platted the town and renamed it Sacramento. Local tradition holds the name was suggested by John Vickers, recently returned from the California Gold Rush. The city was incorporated on October 8, 1860, and the post office followed suit the next year.

=== The Battle of Sacramento ===
Sacramento was the site of a Civil War battle between Union forces under Maj. Eli H. Murray and Confederate forces under Colonel Nathan Bedford Forrest. Nicknamed "Forrest's First Fight", the Battle of Sacramento took place on December 28, 1861. The battle began when a Confederate sympathizer named Mollie Morehead informed Forrest that a Union force was watering their horses nearby. Forrest used the element of surprise to rout the Union troops. The city holds an annual reënactment of the battle in which local residents participate, along with professional and amateur reënactors.

== Geography ==
Sacramento is located in southern McLean County at 37°24′59″N 87°16′4″W (37.416489, -87.267839). The city is concentrated around the intersection of Kentucky Route 81/Kentucky Route 85 (Main Street) and Kentucky Route 254 (2nd Street), northeast of Madisonville. KY 81 and KY 85 converge in the northeastern part of town, and diverge just south of the city. KY 81 leads north 10 miles (16 km) to Calhoun, the county seat, and southeast the same distance to South Carrollton, while KY 85 leads east 8 miles (13 km) to Island and west 15 miles (24 km) to Madisonville. KY 254 also leads to Madisonville, by a more northerly route of 18 miles (29 km).

According to the United States Census Bureau, Sacramento has a total area of 0.43 square miles (1.1 km^{2}), all land.

== Demographics ==
Historical population
Census	Pop.	Note	%±
1860	373		—
1870	195		−47.7%
1880	172		−11.8%
1890	297		72.7%
1900	434		46.1%
1910	438		0.9%
1920	410		−6.4%
1930	327		−20.2%
1940	379		15.9%
1950	378		−0.3%
1960	429		13.5%
1970	437		1.9%
1980	538		23.1%
1990	563		4.6%
2000	517		−8.2%
2010	468		−9.5%
2020	429		−8.3%
U.S. Decennial Census

As of the census of 2000, there were 517 people, 219 households, and 150 families residing in the city. The population density was 1,229.5 inhabitants per square mile (474.7/km^{2}). There were 238 housing units at an average density of 566.0 per square mile (218.5/km^{2}). The racial makeup of the city was 93.81% White, 3.09% African American, 0.77% Native American, 0.58% from other races, and 1.74% from two or more races. Hispanic or Latino of any race were 0.97% of the population.

There were 219 households, out of which 27.4% had children under the age of 18 living with them, 49.3% were married couples living together, 15.1% had a female householder with no husband present, and 31.5% were non-families. 26.9% of all households were made up of individuals, and 12.8% had someone living alone who was 65 years of age or older. The average household size was 2.36 and the average family size was 2.77.

In the city, the population was spread out, with 22.2% under the age of 18, 10.3% from 18 to 24, 25.7% from 25 to 44, 26.7% from 45 to 64, and 15.1% who were 65 years of age or older. The median age was 36 years. For every 100 females, there were 95.8 males. For every 100 females age 18 and over, there were 89.6 males.

The median income for a household in the city was $23,889, and the median income for a family was $27,344. Males had a median income of $22,045 versus $22,083 for females. The per capita income for the city was $11,811. About 19.1% of families and 21.8% of the population were below the poverty line, including 25.8% of those under the age of 18 and 21.7% of those age 65 or over.

== Notable people ==
- Harry F. Adams (1895–1977), college athletics coach, head coach of the University of Montana's track and field team for over 35 years
