= Island, Kentucky =

- City
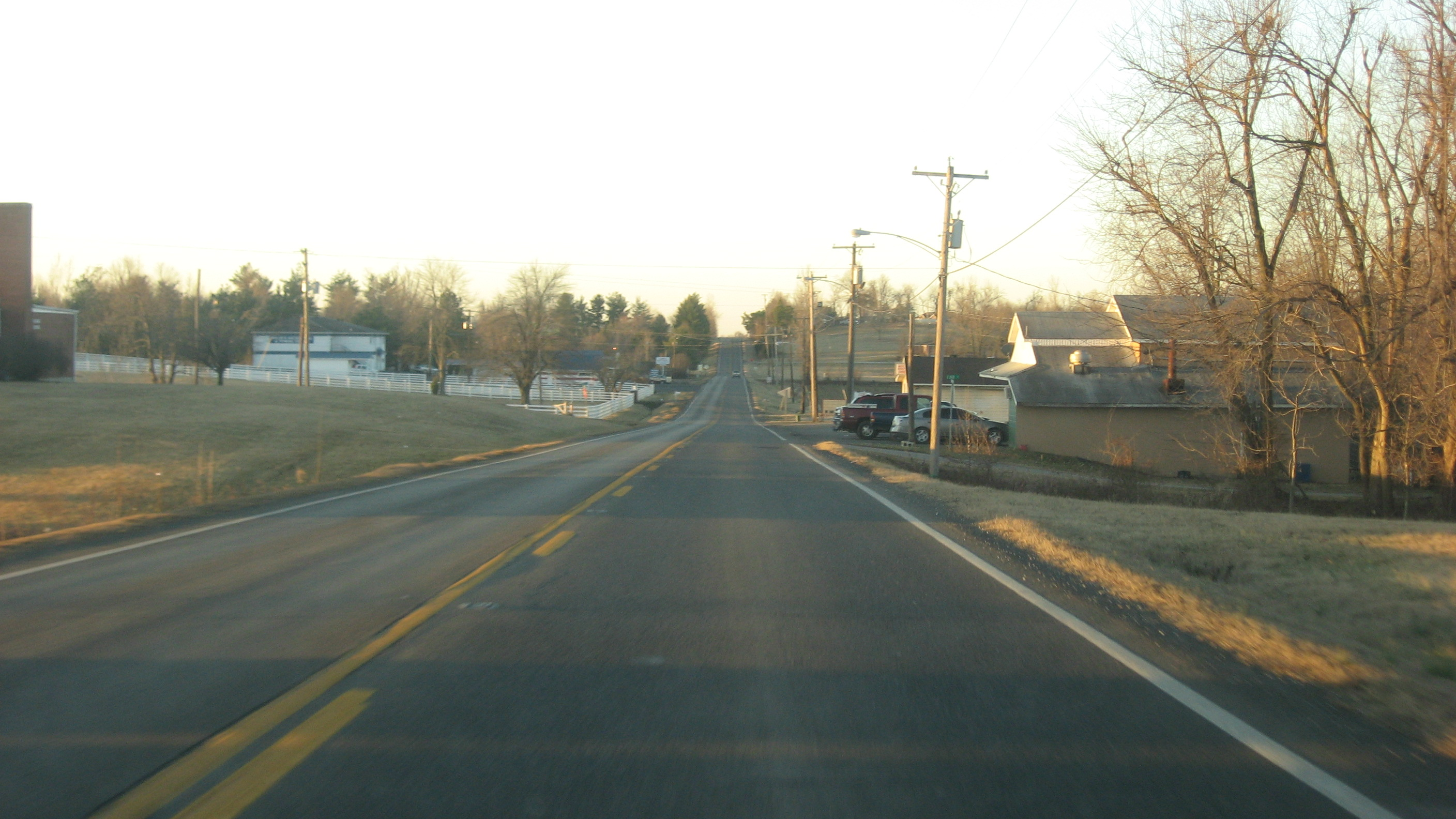
- Adams Avenue on the city's south side

- Location in McLean County, Kentucky
- Coordinates: 37°26′33″N 87°8′48″W
- Country: United States
- State: Kentucky
- County: McLean
- Incorporated: Before 1908
- Named for: a local farm

Area
  - Total: 0.34 sq mi (0.87 km^{2})
  - Land: 0.34 sq mi (0.87 km^{2})
  - Water: 0 sq mi (0.00 km^{2})
- Elevation: 449 ft (137 m)

Population (2020)
  - Total: 429
  - Density: 1,274.8/sq mi (492.19/km^{2})
- Time zone: UTC-6 (Central (CST))
  - Summer (DST): UTC-5 (CDT)
- ZIP code: 42350
- Area code: 270
- FIPS code: 21-39700
- GNIS feature ID: 0495040

Island is a home rule-class city in McLean County, Kentucky, in the United States. The population was 429 at the 2020 census. It is included in the Owensboro metropolitan area.

== History ==
The city is named for Judge William Worthington's early 19th-century 8-square-mile (21 km^{2}) estate, known as "The Island" from the way high water on the Green and other nearby rivers would maroon it from adjacent land. Between 1829 and 1860, the local post office operated as "Worthington". The Owensboro and Nashville Railroad connected the area in 1872; the station and new post office were known as "Island Station". Both were shortened to "Island" in 1882.

== Geography ==
Island is located at 37°26′33″N 87°8′48″W (37.442444, -87.146633). It is in the southeastern portion of McLean County along U.S. Route 431 at its junction with Kentucky Route 85. Also traversing the city is Kentucky Route 2110. US 431 leads north 3 miles (5 km) to Livermore and 23 miles (37 km) to Owensboro, while to the south it leads 11 miles (18 km) to Central City. KY 85 leads east 10 miles (16 km) to Centertown and west 7 miles (11 km) to Sacramento.

According to the United States Census Bureau, Island has a total area of 0.34 square miles (0.88 km^{2}), of which 0.001 square miles (0.003 km^{2}), or 0.30%, are water.

== Demographics ==
Historical population
Census	Pop.	Note	%±
1910	647		—
1920	623		−3.7%
1930	694		11.4%
1940	626		−9.8%
1950	566		−9.6%
1960	462		−18.4%
1970	410		−11.3%
1980	532		29.8%
1990	446		−16.2%
2000	435		−2.5%
2010	458		5.3%
2020	429		−6.3%
U.S. Decennial Census

As of the census of 2000, there were 435 people, 182 households, and 123 families residing in the city. The population density was 1,237.8 inhabitants per square mile (477.9/km^{2}). There were 210 housing units at an average density of 597.6 per square mile (230.7/km^{2}). The racial makeup of the city was 99.31% White, 0.23% Native American, 0.46% from other races.

There were 182 households, out of which 34.6% had children under the age of 18 living with them, 54.9% were married couples living together, 10.4% had a female householder with no husband present, and 32.4% were non-families. 29.1% of all households were made up of individuals, and 13.7% had someone living alone who was 65 years of age or older. The average household size was 2.39 and the average family size was 2.98.

In the city, the population was spread out, with 26.9% under the age of 18, 8.7% from 18 to 24, 26.2% from 25 to 44, 25.3% from 45 to 64, and 12.9% who were 65 years of age or older. The median age was 36 years. For every 100 females, there were 90.8 males. For every 100 females age 18 and over, there were 83.8 males.

The median income for a household in the city was $23,750, and the median income for a family was $31,875. Males had a median income of $33,333 versus $15,313 for females. The per capita income for the city was $15,284. About 9.5% of families and 12.5% of the population were below the poverty line, including 16.0% of those under age 18 and 21.3% of those age 65 or over.

== Notable people ==
- Bobby Veach, former MLB player
- William Worthington - founder, Revolutionary War Veteran, Kentucky State Senator, Circuit Court Judge
- Colonel Absalom Redmond Shacklett - Highest-ranking officer of Civil War within McLean County, American-Mexican War veteran, POW, State Legislator
