= Pellville, Kentucky =

Unincorporated community in Kentucky, United States

Coordinates: 37°45′08″N 86°48′49″W

Pellville is an unincorporated community in Hancock County, Kentucky, in the United States. The ZIP code is: 42364

== History ==
Pellville was incorporated in 1870. It was originally known as Bucksnort and then later on had a post office named Blackford, Kentucky. The post office opened on May 29, 1851, and closed on September 19, 2009. The town was renamed to honor Samuel B. Pell (who was a former state legislator) in 1868.

== Notable people ==
Baseball player Johnny Morrison was born in Pellville.
