= Kentucky Route 2698 =

Highway in Kentucky, US

Kentucky Route 2698
- KY 2698 highlighted in red

Route information
- Maintained by KYTC
- Length: 3.445 mi (5.544 km)

Major junctions
- South end: Keller Road
- US 60
- North end: KY 81 at Owensboro

Location
- Country: United States
- State: Kentucky
- Counties: Daviess

Highway system
- Kentucky State Highway System; Interstate; US; State; Parkways
← KY 2697	→ KY 2699

Kentucky Route 2698 is a state highway that begins at Keller Road via Rural Daviess County and Owensboro. Next to US 60, and Kentucky Route 81 in Owensboro.

== Route Description ==
Kentucky Route 2698 (KY 2698) is a 3.445-mile-long (5.544 km) mostly urban secondary highway that begins at Keller Road. The highway goes north along Carter Road making its way to the junction with KY 2121 (Southtown Boulevard). As then, the road makes its way to a non-signed road called Tamarack Road. At one of its main junctions, is U.S. Route 60 (US 60). Also just 232 feet (71 m) north of that highway is the terminus of KY 2707 (Barron Drive). Finally, The highway ends at KY 81.

== Major intersections ==
The entire route is in Daviess County.

Location	mi	km	Destinations	Notes
	0.000	0.000	Keller Road	Southern terminus
Owensboro	1.186	1.909	KY 2121 east (Southtown Boulevard)	Western terminus of KY 2121
	2.548	4.101	US 60 east (Wendell H. Ford Expressway)	
	2.605	4.192	KY 2707 south (Barron Drive)	Northern terminus of KY 2707
	3.447	5.547	KY 81	Northern terminus
1.000 mi = 1.609 km; 1.000 km = 0.621 mi
