= Masonville, Kentucky =

Census-designated place in Kentucky, United States

- Census-designated place
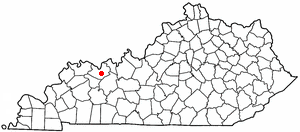
- Location of Masonville, Kentucky
- Coordinates: 37°41′1″N 87°2′12″W
- Country: United States
- State: Kentucky
- County: Daviess

Area
  - Total: 10.42 sq mi (27.00 km^{2})
  - Land: 10.36 sq mi (26.82 km^{2})
  - Water: 0.069 sq mi (0.18 km^{2})
- Elevation: 423 ft (129 m)

Population (2020)
  - Total: 2,129
  - Density: 205.6/sq mi (79.37/km^{2})
- Time zone: UTC-6 (Central (CST))
  - Summer (DST): UTC-5 (CDT)
- Area codes: 270 & 364
- FIPS code: 21-50520
- GNIS feature ID: 0497667

Masonville is an unincorporated community and census-designated place (CDP) in Daviess County, Kentucky, United States. The population was 2,129 as of the 2020 census, doubling from 1,014 in the 2010 census. It is included in the Owensboro Metropolitan Statistical Area.

== Geography ==
Masonville is located in south-central Daviess County at 37°41′1″N 87°2′12″W (37.683612, -87.036563). U.S. Route 231 passes through the center of the CDP. The William H. Natcher Parkway forms the eastern border of the CDP, but there is no exit for the community. Owensboro, the county seat, is 8 miles (13 km) to the northwest, and Hartford is 17 miles (27 km) to the southeast.

According to the United States Census Bureau, the Masonville CDP has a total area of 10.4 square miles (27.0 km^{2}), of which 10.3 square miles (26.8 km^{2}) is land and 0.1 square miles (0.2 km^{2}), or 0.66%, is water.

== Demographics ==
Historical population
| Census | Pop. | Note | %± |
|---|---|---|---|
| 2010 | 1,014 | | — |
| 2020 | 2,129 | | 110.0% |
U.S. Decennial Census

=== 2020 census ===
As of the 2020 census, Masonville had a population of 2,129. The median age was 32.8 years. 31.1% of residents were under the age of 18 and 10.9% of residents were 65 years of age or older. For every 100 females there were 94.3 males, and for every 100 females age 18 and over there were 92.8 males age 18 and over.

0.0% of residents lived in urban areas, while 100.0% lived in rural areas.

There were 738 households in Masonville, of which 44.3% had children under the age of 18 living in them. Of all households, 65.7% were married-couple households, 13.0% were households with a male householder and no spouse or partner present, and 17.1% were households with a female householder and no spouse or partner present. About 19.4% of all households were made up of individuals and 9.6% had someone living alone who was 65 years of age or older.

There were 764 housing units, of which 3.4% were vacant. The homeowner vacancy rate was 0.0% and the rental vacancy rate was 7.0%.

Racial composition as of the 2020 census
| Race | Number | Percent |
|---|---|---|
| White | 1,969 | 92.5% |
| Black or African American | 36 | 1.7% |
| American Indian and Alaska Native | 5 | 0.2% |
| Asian | 23 | 1.1% |
| Native Hawaiian and Other Pacific Islander | 0 | 0.0% |
| Some other race | 10 | 0.5% |
| Two or more races | 86 | 4.0% |
| Hispanic or Latino (of any race) | 46 | 2.2% |

=== 2000 census ===
As of the census of 2000, there were 1,075 people, 381 households, and 310 families residing in the CDP. The population density was 120.1 inhabitants per square mile (46.4/km^{2}). There were 411 housing units at an average density of 45.9 per square mile (17.7/km^{2}). The racial makeup of the CDP was 99.16% White, 0.09% African American, and 0.74% from two or more races. Hispanic or Latino of any race were 0.19% of the population.

There were 381 households, out of which 41.5% had children under the age of 18 living with them, 67.7% were married couples living together, 9.7% had a female householder with no husband present, and 18.6% were non-families. 17.1% of all households were made up of individuals, and 5.5% had someone living alone who was 65 years of age or older. The average household size was 2.82 and the average family size was 3.15.

In the CDP, the population was spread out, with 30.0% under the age of 18, 7.3% from 18 to 24, 30.8% from 25 to 44, 23.0% from 45 to 64, and 9.0% who were 65 years of age or older. The median age was 34 years. For every 100 females, there were 102.8 males. For every 100 females age 18 and over, there were 99.7 males.

The median income for a household in the CDP was $37,171, and the median income for a family was $45,795. Males had a median income of $35,089 versus $19,250 for females. The per capita income for the CDP was $20,469. About 10.9% of families and 10.3% of the population were below the poverty line, including 21.2% of those under age 18 and 10.5% of those age 65 or over.
