= Rockport, Kentucky =

- City
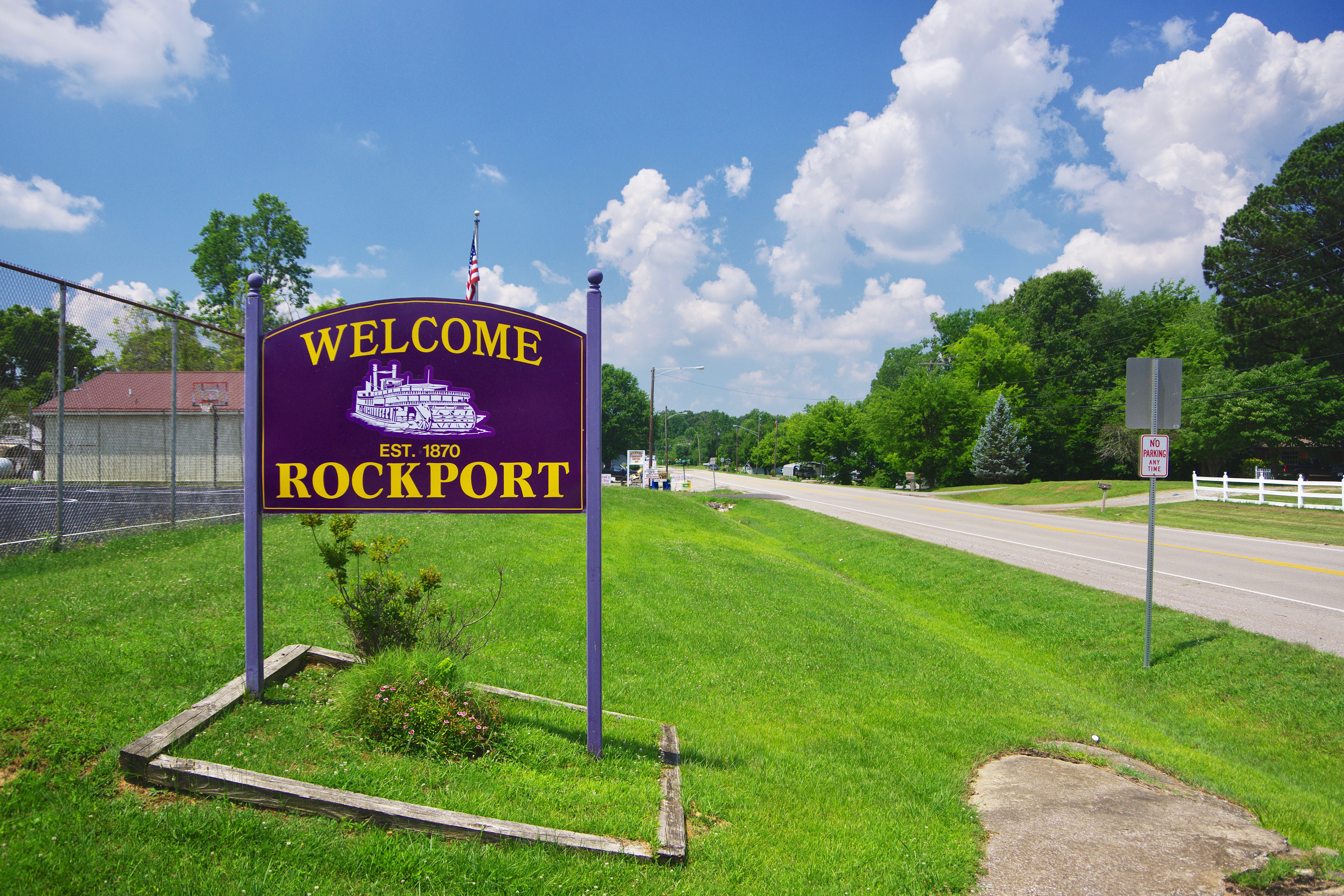
- Welcome sign along US 62

- Location of Rockport in Ohio County, Kentucky.
- Coordinates: 37°20′11″N 86°59′34″W
- Country: United States
- State: Kentucky
- County: Ohio

Area
  - Total: 0.74 sq mi (1.91 km^{2})
  - Land: 0.69 sq mi (1.80 km^{2})
  - Water: 0.042 sq mi (0.11 km^{2})
- Elevation: 436 ft (133 m)

Population (2020)
  - Total: 262
  - Density: 377.2/sq mi (145.63/km^{2})
- Time zone: UTC-6 (Central (CST))
  - Summer (DST): UTC-5 (CDT)
- ZIP code: 42369
- Area code: 270
- FIPS code: 21-66216
- GNIS feature ID: 0502221

Rockport is a home rule-class city in Ohio County, Kentucky, United States. As of the 2020 census, Rockport had a population of 262. The city is descriptively named for the large rocks on a nearby river bank.

== History ==
Rockport is rooted in a small settlement known as Benton's Ferry, which developed along the Green River in the early 19th century. When a post office was established in 1863, the settlement used the name "Rock Port" (later shortened to a single word). Originally located primarily along the river, most of the city has since shifted to the bluff above the river.

== Geography ==
Rockport is located at 37°20′11″N 86°59′34″W (37.336428, −86.992778). The city is situated along the Green River northeast of Central City. U.S. Route 62 traverses the city.

According to the United States Census Bureau, the city has a total area of 0.8 square miles (2.1 km^{2}), of which 0.8 square miles (2.1 km^{2}) is land and 0.04 square miles (0.10 km^{2}) (5.00%) is water.

== Demographics ==
Historical population
Census	Pop.	Note	%±
1870	173		—
1880	390		125.4%
1890	435		11.5%
1900	525		20.7%
1910	658		25.3%
1920	950		44.4%
1930	671		−29.4%
1940	501		−25.3%
1950	450		−10.2%
1960	396		−12.0%
1970	377		−4.8%
1980	511		35.5%
1990	385		−24.7%
2000	334		−13.2%
2010	266		−20.4%
2020	262		−1.5%
U.S. Decennial Census

As of the census of 2000, there were 334 people, 133 households, and 104 families residing in the city. The population density was 439.9 inhabitants per square mile (169.8/km^{2}). There were 152 housing units at an average density of 200.2 per square mile (77.3/km^{2}). The racial makeup of the city was 99.40% White, and 0.60% from two or more races.

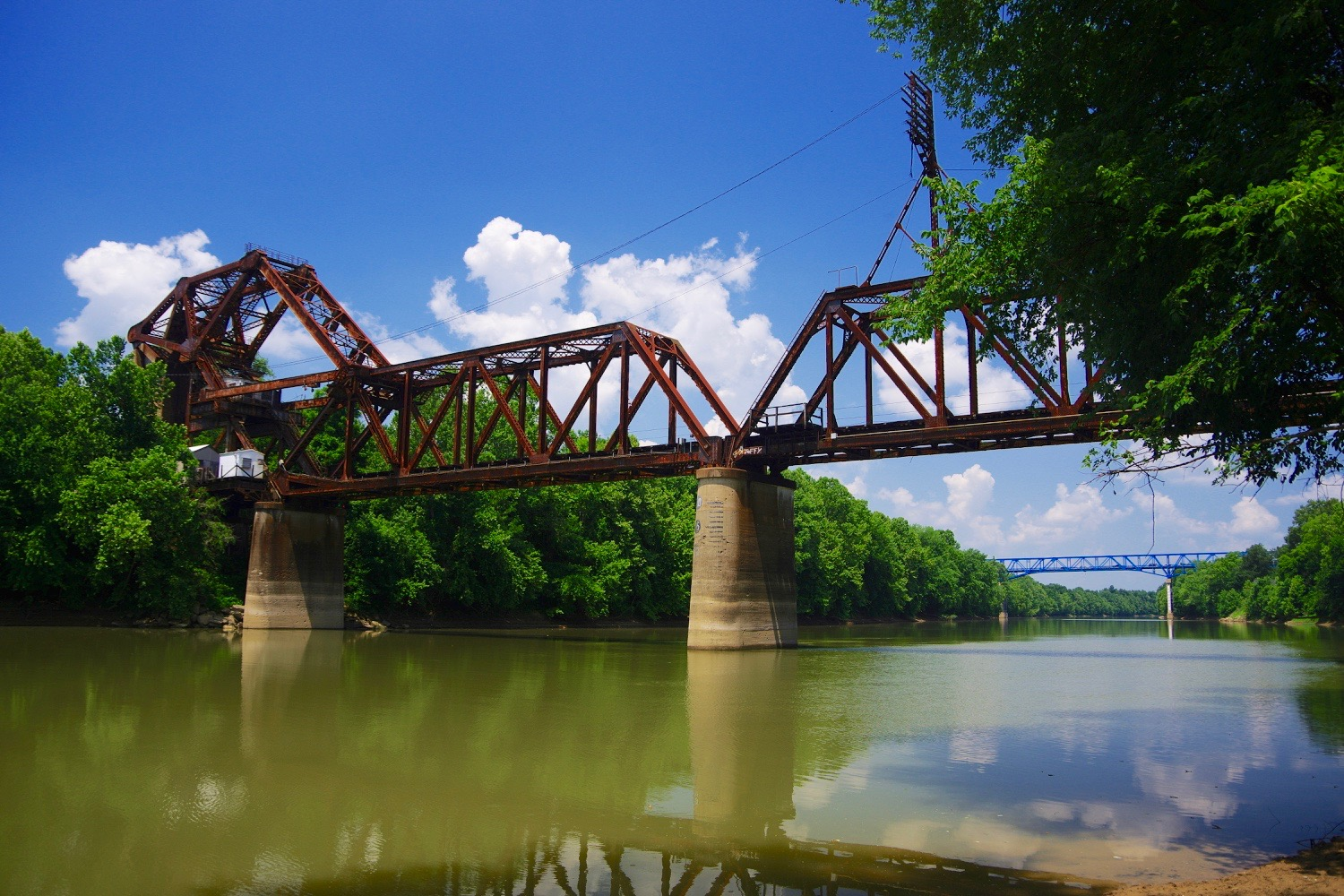
Railroad bridge over the Green River at Rockport

There were 133 households, out of which 27.1% had children under the age of 18 living with them, 65.4% were married couples living together, 10.5% had a female householder with no husband present, and 21.1% were non-families. 19.5% of all households were made up of individuals, and 10.5% had someone living alone who was 65 years of age or older. The average household size was 2.51 and the average family size was 2.85.

In the city, the population was spread out, with 20.1% under the age of 18, 9.3% from 18 to 24, 24.3% from 25 to 44, 29.9% from 45 to 64, and 16.5% who were 65 years of age or older. The median age was 42 years. For every 100 females, there were 98.8 males. For every 100 females age 18 and over, there were 97.8 males.

The median income for a household in the city was $28,889, and the median income for a family was $32,500. Males had a median income of $42,188 versus $16,750 for females. The per capita income for the city was $13,184. About 22.4% of families and 26.1% of the population were below the poverty line, including 38.4% of those under age 18 and 14.6% of those age 65 or over.
