= Ohio Township, Spencer County, Indiana =

Ohio Township
- Township
- Coordinates: 37°53′00″N 87°05′52″W
- Country: United States
- State: Indiana
- County: Spencer

Government
  - Type: Indiana township

Area
  - Total: 68.16 sq mi (176.5 km^{2})
  - Land: 67.63 sq mi (175.2 km^{2})
  - Water: 0.54 sq mi (1.4 km^{2})
- Elevation: 423 ft (129 m)

Population (2020)
  - Total: 4,842
  - Density: 71.60/sq mi (27.64/km^{2})
- FIPS code: 18-56160
- GNIS feature ID: 453684

Ohio Township is one of nine townships in Spencer County, Indiana, United States As of the 2020 census, its population was 4,842 and it contained 2,207 housing units. Ohio Township contains the city of Rockport.

Historical population
Census	Pop.	Note	%±
1890	5,571		—
1900	5,933		6.5%
1910	5,454		−8.1%
1920	4,829		−11.5%
1930	4,459		−7.7%
1940	4,326		−3.0%
1950	4,308		−0.4%
1960	4,284		−0.6%
1970	4,512		5.3%
1980	5,068		12.3%
1990	4,849		−4.3%
2000	5,092		5.0%
2010	5,306		4.2%
2020	4,842		−8.7%
Source: US Decennial Census

== History ==
Ohio Township was first settled in about 1818.

== Geography ==
According to the 2010 census, the township has a total area of 68.16 square miles (176.5 km^{2}), of which 67.63 square miles (175.2 km^{2}) (or 99.22%) is land and 0.54 square miles (1.4 km^{2}) (or 0.79%) is water.

=== Cities and towns ===
- Rockport

=== Unincorporated towns ===
- Africa
- Lake Mill
- Patronville
- Reo
- Rock Hill
- Silverdale
