= Kentucky Route 2830 =

State highway in Kentucky, United States

Kentucky Route 2830

Route information
- Maintained by KTC
- Length: 5.361 mi (8.628 km)
- Existed: November 25, 1998–present

Major junctions
- South end: KY 144 northeast of Owensboro
- KY 405 in Maceo
- North end: KY 334 to US 60 near Maceo

Location
- Country: United States
- State: Kentucky
- Counties: Daviess

Highway system
- Kentucky State Highway System; Interstate; US; State; Parkways
← KY 2829	→ KY 2831

Kentucky Route 2830 (KY 2830) is a two-lane, largely rural highway in northeastern Daviess County, Kentucky. The southern terminus is at KY 144 and the northern terminus is at KY 334. The road serves the community of Maceo.

== Route description ==
KY 2830 begins at an intersection with KY 144 northwest of Thruston. From this intersection, the highway runs northeast, generally parallel to U.S. Route 60 (US 60) and US 231. KY 2830's first highway intersection is with KY 1831, also known as Wright's Landing Road. KY 2830 continues along a northeast heading alongside a CSX rail line.

KY 2830 then enters the community of Maceo, where it serves as the western terminus of KY 405. KY 2830 leaves Maceo, still following the railroad northeast, until its northern terminus at KY 334. KY 334 takes over the route for a very short distance and ends at US 60.

== History ==
KY 2830 is the former routing of US 60, which was four-laned and relocated slightly to the north (in fact, the new four-lane US 60 is within sight of KY 2830 for quite a distance) on November 25, 1998. When US 60 was rerouted, as is customary in Kentucky, instead of turning over the old highway to a local agency, the state retained control and merely applied for a new number, in this case KY 2830. Originally, all of KY 2830 was classified as a Supplemental Road by the Kentucky Transportation Cabinet. The portion of the route between KY 405 in Maceo and KY 334 north of Maceo was promoted to the Rural Secondary System on October 26, 2004.

When the new bypass around east Owensboro opened, KY 2830 was extended onto the old US 60 to the junction of KY 144, where the road ends.

== Major intersections ==
The entire route is in Daviess County.

Location	mi	km	Destinations	Notes
Owensboro	0.000	0.000	KY 144	Southern terminus
	1.112	1.790	KY 1831 east	Western terminus of KY 1831
Maceo	4.464	7.184	KY 405 south	Northern terminus of KY 405
	5.289	8.512	KY 334 to US 60	Northern terminus
1.000 mi = 1.609 km; 1.000 km = 0.621 mi
