= Owensboro Bridge =

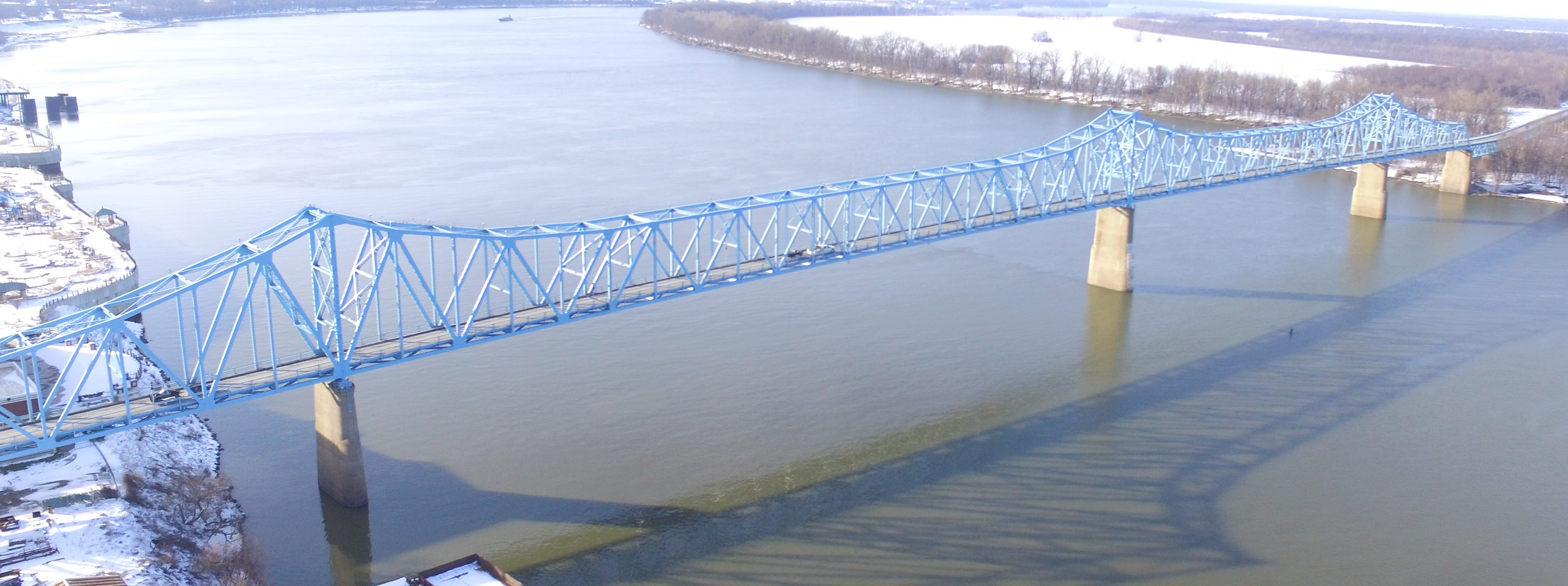
- Owensboro Bridge in winter, looking towards Spencer County, Indiana
- Coordinates: 37°46′45″N 87°06′33″W
- Carries: SR 161/ KY 2262
- Crosses: Ohio River
- Locale: Owensboro, Kentucky-Patronville, Indiana
- Official name: Owensboro Bridge
- Maintained by: Kentucky Transportation Cabinet

Characteristics
- Design: Continuous truss bridge
- Material: Steel
- Total length: 615 m
- Longest span: 230 m (754ft)

History
- Designer: Frank Masters
- Engineering design by: Modjeski & Masters
- Opened: 1940

Statistics
- Daily traffic: 7,292
- Toll: Until 1954

Location
- Interactive map of Owensboro Bridge

The Owensboro Bridge is a continuous truss bridge that spans the Ohio River between Owensboro, Kentucky and Spencer County, Indiana. Dedicated to the memory of the late U.S. Congressman Glover H. Cary (1885–1936) and often erroneously called the "Glover Cary Bridge," the bridge opened to traffic in September 1940. It originally was a toll bridge, but tolls were discontinued in 1954. It carried US 231 into Kentucky from Indiana from 1940 to 2002 when 231 was moved onto the newly completed Natcher Bridge. Subsequently, its designation was changed to Indiana 161 and Kentucky 2262. Painted silver when it opened, the bridge was painted blue in the 1970s and often is called the Blue Bridge by local residents and media.

== Color ==
In anticipation of a repainting of the bridge initially scheduled for 2006 (the previous repainting was in 1987), the local city beautification group PRIDE of Owensboro-Daviess County (Public Responsibility In Designing our Environment) sponsored an August 2003 straw poll to help determine what color to paint the bridge. PRIDE gave participants a choice of "blue," "teal," "brick red," or "green" – or participants could "write in" their own preferences. Of the 8,245 participants in the poll, 44 percent preferred to keep the bridge blue. A majority of participants – 56% – preferred that the bridge be painted a different color, with 20 percent opting for teal, 18 percent for brick red, 12 percent for green, and 6 percent suggesting various "write-in" colors.

Subsequently, Kentucky and Indiana highway officials indicated the bridge was scheduled for its next repainting in about 2017 (which happens to be Owensboro's bicentennial) at an estimated cost of $17 million. The repainting was rescheduled to begin in the spring of 2013.

== See also ==
- List of crossings of the Ohio River
