= Audubon Parkway =

Highway in Kentucky, U.S.

Audubon Parkway

Route information
- Maintained by KYTC
- Length: 23.441 mi (37.725 km)

Major junctions
- West end: I-69 / US 41 in Henderson
- KY 416 in Hebbardsville
- East end: US 60 in Owensboro

Location
- Country: United States
- State: Kentucky
- Counties: Henderson, Daviess

Highway system
- Kentucky State Highway System; Interstate; US; State; Parkways

The Audubon Parkway is a freeway and former toll road connecting the cities of Henderson and Owensboro, Kentucky. Named for John James Audubon, an early American naturalist, the Audubon's western terminus is at US 41; the eastern terminus is US 60. The road opened on December 18, 1970, at a cost of $23.5 million (equivalent to $146 million in 2024) and, at 23.4 miles (37.7 km), is the shortest of the seven roads in the state's parkway system. It is also the only road in the parkway system that has not had the name of a Kentucky politician attached to it. The road carries the unsigned designation of Kentucky Route 9005 (AU 9005). A white and gold shield was used along the Audubon Parkway until 2006, when a new, standardized blue-on-white marker was introduced for all of Kentucky's parkways.

== History ==
The Audubon Parkway previously used a distinctive gold shield.

The Audubon Parkway, was open as a toll road in 1970.

The Audubon and the nearby William H. Natcher Parkway, which opened in 1972, were the last two remaining tolled parkways in Kentucky's parkway system. They both had their tolls removed on Tuesday, November 21, 2006. Ernie Fletcher, who was governor at the time, announced the removal of the tolls at the Natcher Parkway's Hartford toll plaza in Ohio County on September 27, 2006. Fletcher himself manned the end loader which demolished one of the Audubon's Hebbardsville toll booths during a press conference and ceremony which heralded the end of toll collections.

With the end of toll collection, the Hebbardsville interchange was modified slightly, although its past as the parkway's only toll plaza remains in the modified-cloverleaf layout of the ramps, a trait shared by most such interchanges on Kentucky's other parkways. The islands where the toll booths were mounted were removed, and the pavement at the interchange was smoothed over, although the rumble strips approaching the interchange from both directions remain as of July 2009. During 2008, the former toll plaza office on the south side of the interchange was demolished. It was the only toll plaza on the Audubon was located at the exit 10 interchange at KY 416 near Hebbardsville, in eastern Henderson County.

== Future ==
=== Interstate 69 Spur ===
Future Interstate 369
- Location: Henderson–Owensboro

Daviess County officials first proposed in 2005 that the Audubon be upgraded to an Interstate highway, specifically suggesting the number I-369. This would, according to the proposal, take place if and when the I-69 Ohio River Crossing and its approaches are completed. The I-69 "spur" would connect Owensboro, Kentucky, to I-69 with I-369 as the likely designation.

The Audubon would have to be significantly upgraded in order for it to be approved as an Interstate Highway; the shoulders would need to be widened and the median would have to be widened or have a rigid safety barrier constructed along its entire 24-mile (39 km) length.

The Audubon Parkway became a High Priority Interstate Corridor, referred to as the "Future Interstate Route 69 Spur" in the SAFETEA-LU Technical Corrections Act of 2008, which became Public Law 110-244 on June 6, 2008. New "Future I-69 Spur" signs were placed on the parkway in September 2008.

== Exit list ==
| County | Location | mi | km | Exit | Destinations | Notes |
|---|---|---|---|---|---|---|
| Henderson | Henderson | 1.000 | 1.609 | 1 | I-69 / US 41 – Evansville, Madisonville | I-69 exit 149; signed as exits 1A (north) and 1B (south) |
| Henderson | | 5.389 | 8.673 | 5 | KY 1078 – Zion | Constructed in 1986 |
| Henderson | Hebbardsville | 10.175 | 16.375 | 10 | KY 416 – Niagara, Hebbardsville | Former toll plaza; original exit |
| Daviess | | 18.043 | 29.037 | 18 | KY 1554 – Stanley, Sorgho | Constructed in 1986 |
| Daviess | Owensboro | 23.441 | 37.725 | 24 | US 60 to I-165 – Owensboro, Hawesville | Eastern terminus and signed as exits 24A (south) and 24B (north); US 60 exit 10 |
1.000 mi = 1.609 km; 1.000 km = 0.621 mi
