= National Register of Historic Places listings in Breckinridge County, Kentucky =

Location of Breckinridge County in Kentucky

This is a list of the National Register of Historic Places listings in Breckinridge County, Kentucky.

This is intended to be a complete list of the properties and districts on the National Register of Historic Places in Breckinridge County, Kentucky, United States. The locations of National Register properties and districts for which the latitude and longitude coordinates are included below, may be seen in a map.

There are 11 properties and districts listed on the National Register in the county.

This National Park Service list is complete through NPS recent listings posted March 21, 2025.

== Current listings ==
	Name on the Register	Image	Date listed	Location	City or town	Description
1	Cloverport Historic District	Cloverport Historic District	June 21, 1983 (#83002589)	Roughly bounded by 3rd, Main, Chestnut, and Lynn Sts. 37°50′11″N 86°37′54″W	Cloverport	
2	Falls of Rough Historic District	Falls of Rough Historic District	January 31, 1978 (#78001305)	Kentucky Route 110; 37°35′22″N 86°33′03″W	Falls of Rough	
3	Fisher Homestead		June 21, 1983 (#83002590)	U.S. Route 60; 37°50′04″N 86°36′48″W	Cloverport	
4	Holt Bottoms Archeological District		November 16, 1978 (#78001306)	Address Restricted	Holt	
5	Joseph Holt House and Chapel	Joseph Holt House and Chapel	July 12, 1976 (#76000853)	Southwest of Addison on Kentucky Route 144; 37°54′38″N 86°34′39″W	Addison	
6	Irvington Historic District	Irvington Historic District	June 29, 1998 (#97001342)	Roughly bounded by CSX tracks, Third, Caroline and Walnut Sts. 37°52′56″N 86°17′04″W	Irvington	
7	Mattingly Petroglyphs (15BC128)		September 8, 1989 (#89001172)	Address Restricted	Mattingly	
8	North Fork Rough River Petroglyph (15BC130)		September 8, 1989 (#89001174)	Address Restricted	Roff	
9	Oglesby-Conrad House		June 21, 1983 (#83002591)	Off U.S. Route 60; 37°49′57″N 86°38′53″W	Cloverport	
10	Skillman House		June 21, 1983 (#83002592)	Tile Plant Rd. 37°50′28″N 86°37′23″W	Cloverport	
11	Tar Springs Petroglyphs (15BC129)		September 8, 1989 (#89001173)	Address Restricted	Cloverport	

== See also ==
- List of National Historic Landmarks in Kentucky
