= National Register of Historic Places listings in Grayson County, Kentucky =

Location of Grayson County in Kentucky

This is a list of the National Register of Historic Places listings in Grayson County, Kentucky.

This is intended to be a complete list of the properties and districts on the National Register of Historic Places in Grayson County, Kentucky, United States. The locations of National Register properties and districts for which the latitude and longitude coordinates are included below, may be seen in a map.

There are 11 properties and districts listed on the National Register in the county.

This National Park Service list is complete through NPS recent listings posted March 21, 2025.

== Current listings ==
	Name on the Register	Image	Date listed	Location	City or town	Description
1	The Cedars	The Cedars	May 17, 1976 (#76000889)	East of Leitchfield on Kentucky Route 1214; 37°28′28″N 86°15′26″W	Leitchfield	
2	Court Square Historic District	Court Square Historic District	November 23, 1984 (#84000288)	Court House Square between Walnut and Market Sts.; also 106 and 104 N. Main; 37°28′48″N 86°17′38″W	Leitchfield	Addresses on N. Main St. are a boundary increase
3	Crow Hollow Petroglyphs (15GY65)		September 8, 1989 (#89001188)	Address Restricted	Clarkson	
4	Falls of Rough Historic District	Falls of Rough Historic District	January 31, 1978 (#78001305)	Kentucky Route 110; 37°35′21″N 86°33′07″W	Falls of Rough	Extends into Breckinridge County
5	Grayson Springs	Grayson Springs	December 6, 1978 (#78001334)	South of Clarkson; 37°27′37″N 86°13′29″W	Clarkson	
6	Hunter House	Hunter House	May 16, 1985 (#85001055)	118 W. Walnut St. 37°28′53″N 86°17′42″W	Leitchfield	
7	St. Augustine Catholic Church	St. Augustine Catholic Church	April 7, 1989 (#89000259)	Kentucky Route 88; 37°27′02″N 86°13′57″W	Grayson Springs	
8	Saltsman Branch Petroglyphs (15GY66)		September 8, 1989 (#89001189)	Address Restricted	Moutardier	
9	Saltsman Branch Shelter Petroglyphs (15GY67)		September 8, 1989 (#89001190)	Address Restricted	Moutardier	
10	Jack Thomas House	Jack Thomas House	April 21, 1976 (#76000890)	108 E. Main St. 37°28′47″N 86°17′32″W	Leitchfield	
11	Walnut Grove School		February 2, 1988 (#87002516)	Walnut Grove Rd. 37°26′38″N 86°30′18″W	Caneyville	

== See also ==
- List of National Historic Landmarks in Kentucky
- National Register of Historic Places listings in Kentucky
