= Kentucky Route 261 =

State highway in Kentucky, United States

Kentucky Route 261
- KY 261 highlighted in red

Route information
- Maintained by KYTC
- Length: 42.605 mi (68.566 km)

Major junctions
- South/West end: KY 54 near Fordsville
- KY 105 at McQuady; US 60 / KY 259 near Hardinsburg
- North/East end: KY 79 in rural Meade Co

Location
- Country: United States
- State: Kentucky
- Counties: Ohio, Hancock, Breckinridge, Meade

Highway system
- Kentucky State Highway System; Interstate; US; State; Parkways
← KY 260	→ KY 262

Kentucky Route 261 (KY 261) is a 42.605-mile-long (68.566 km) state highway in Kentucky that runs from Kentucky Route 54 southeast of Fordsville to Kentucky Route 79 and Sandy Hill Road in rural Meade County southwest of Brandenburg via McQuady, Hardinsburg, and Webster.

== Route description ==
KY 261 begins at a junction with KY 54 on the east side of Fordsville, located in northeastern Ohio County. It then traverses the southernmost tip of Hancock County. The highway intersects KY 2124, along with a few more rural state highways that connect this particular area to Hawesville, the county seat of Hancock County.

KY 261 enters Breckinridge County and then intersects KY 105 at McQuady. It meets U.S. Route 60 (US 60) and KY 259 in the Breckinridge County seat, Hardinsburg. The highway runs concurrently with KY 259 from the US 60 junction to downtown Hardinsburg. KY 261 turns away to traverse mainly rural areas of northeastern Breckinridge County. That section of the route also includes a stretch concurrent with KY 86.

KY 261 ends in Meade County at an intersection with KY 79 between Irvington and the Meade County seat of Brandenburg.

== Major intersections ==
County	Location	mi	km	Destinations	Notes
Ohio		0.000	0.000	KY 54	Southern terminus
Hancock		4.128	6.643	KY 2124 north (Cabot Road)	Southern terminus of KY 2124
Breckinridge		8.306	13.367	KY 629 (Rockvale Road / Mattingly-Tar Fork Road)	
Breckinridge	McQuady	11.844	19.061	KY 105 (McQuady-Axtel Road / Cloverport-McQuady Road)	
Breckinridge	Kirk	13.969	22.481	KY 108 south (Kirk-Glen Dean Road)	Northern terminus of KY 108
Breckinridge		17.380	27.970	US 60 / KY 259 south	South end of KY 259 overlap
Breckinridge	Hardinsburg	18.751	30.177	KY 992 west (Second Street) / Second Street	Eastern terminus of KY 992
Breckinridge	Hardinsburg	18.843	30.325	KY 259 north (North Main Street) / First Street	North end of KY 259 overlap
Breckinridge		21.278	34.244	KY 1385 east (Friendship Ch-Horsley Chapel Road)	Western terminus of KY 1385
Breckinridge		23.874	38.421	KY 1385 west (Friendship Ch-Horsley Chapel Road)	Eastern terminus of KY 1385
Breckinridge		26.826	43.172	KY 86 east (Garfield-Lodiburg Road)	South end of KY 86 overlap
Breckinridge		27.616	44.444	KY 2780 east (Webster-Clifton Mills Road)	Western terminus of KY 2780
Breckinridge		31.470	50.646	KY 86 west	North end of KY 86 overlap
Breckinridge	Webster	35.702	57.457	KY 2780 west (Webster-Clifton Mills Road)	Eastern terminus of KY 2780
Breckinridge	Webster	35.827	57.658	KY 477 north	South end of KY 477 overlap
Breckinridge	Webster	35.996	57.930	KY 477 south	North end of KY 477 overlap
Meade		39.081	62.895	KY 823 west (Hardesty Raymond Road)	Eastern terminus of KY 823
Meade		40.168	64.644	KY 428 south (Guston Road)	Northern terminus of KY 428
Meade		42.605	68.566	KY 79 / Sandy Hill Road	Northern terminus; continues as Sandy Hill Road beyond KY 79
1.000 mi = 1.609 km; 1.000 km = 0.621 mi: Concurrency terminus
