= Locust Hill =

Locust Hill may refer to:

in Canada

- Locust Hill, Ontario, a settlement in the eastern part of Markham, Ontario

in the United States

- John Daniel Rather House, also known as Locust Hill, NRHP-listed in Tuscumbia, Alabama
- Locust Hill, Kentucky, an unincorporated community
- Locust Hill, Missouri, an unincorporated community
- Locust Hill (Brunswick, Missouri), listed on the NRHP in Chariton County, Missouri
- Locust Hill, Virginia (disambiguation), multiple locations
- Locust Hill (Hurt, Virginia), listed on the NRHP in Pittsylvania County, Virginia
- Locust Hill (Leesburg, Virginia), a historic house, in Loudoun County
- Locust Hill (Locust Dale, Virginia), listed on the NRHP in Madison County, Virginia
- Locust Hill (Mechanicsville, Virginia), listed on the NRHP in Rockbridge County, Virginia

== See also ==
- Locust Hill Country Club in the suburbs of Rochester, New York
