= Kirk, Kentucky =

Unincorporated community in Kentucky, United States

- Unincorporated community
- Location within Kentucky Location within the United States
- Coordinates: 37°43′26.21″N 86°28′42.92″W
- Country: United States
- State: Kentucky
- County: Breckinridge
- Elevation: 715 ft (218 m)
- Time zone: UTC-6 (Central (CST))
  - Summer (DST): UTC-5 (CDT)
- Area codes: 270 & 364
- GNIS feature ID: 508393

Kirk is an unincorporated community in Breckinridge County, Kentucky United States. The community was once home to a Methodist church, a post office, a mill, a railroad depot, and was regarded as an important town in the early 20th century.

Named by Henry McCracken, the president of the Louisville, Hardinsburg and Western Railway, the town began to decline after the railroad's closure.

== Geography ==
The community is located on Kentucky Route 261 just north of the intersection with Kentucky Route 108.

Kirk is 4 miles (6.4 km) from Hardinsburg.

== History ==
The Kirk post office was established in November 1890, with the postmaster being James M. Withers.

In addition to the post office, the community had a store, tobacco warehouses, a stave mill, and a station on the Louisville, Hardinsburg and Western Railway. The railroad was built through the town in 1888 and operated until 1941. The name honors Kirk, a town in Germany, and the place was named by Harvey McCracken, the president of the railroad company. Kirk was on the rail line between Hardinsburg and McQuady.

In the early 20th century, Kirk was an "important town" of Breckinridge County, according to The Handbook of Kentucky, a state publication. The population was 26 in 1900. Around that time, the community was described thusly in The Breckinridge News: "The town of Kirk is situated on the 'Henderson route' branch and its inhabitants are of the most wide-awake and industrious kind." The newspaper went on to describe the community as a small town.

A Methodist Episcopal church opened in Kirk in 1900. The dedication ceremony took place on May 13 of that year; 1,500 people were in attendance. The choir for the opening assembly was from the nearby Hardinsburg Methodist Episcopal Church.

One prominent citizen of Kirk was John E. Monarch, who ran for Kentucky state senator in 1925.

The population of Kirk was 56 in 1940.

After the railroad closed the population dwindled. The Kirk post office closed in 1965. Despite the population decline, Kirk still appears on county and state maps.

== See also ==
- Axtel, Kentucky
