= Kentucky Route 105 =

State highway in Kentucky, United States

Kentucky Route 105
- KY 105 highlighted in red

Route information
- Maintained by KYTC
- Length: 18.345 mi (29.523 km)

Major junctions
- South end: KY 79 / KY 2201 near Axtel
- US 60 / KY 144 in Cloverport
- North end: US 60 Bus. in Cloverport

Location
- Country: United States
- State: Kentucky
- Counties: Breckinridge

Highway system
- Kentucky State Highway System; Interstate; US; State; Parkways
← KY 104	→ KY 106

Kentucky Route 105 (KY 105) is an 18.345-mile-long (29.523 km) state highway in Breckinridge County, Kentucky.

== Route description ==
It travels from KY 79 and KY 2201 just west of the unincorporated community of Axtel to U.S. Route 60 Business (US 60 Bus.) in Cloverport.

== History ==
Until 1958, KY 105 also ran a course from Russellville to Axtel via Morgantown and Caneyville. That routing became part of KY 79.

== Major intersections ==
The entire route is in Breckinridge County.

Location	mi	km	Destinations	Notes
	0.000	0.000	KY 79 / KY 2201 south	Southern terminus; northern terminus of KY 2201
	1.662	2.675	KY 2201 north	Southern terminus of KY 2201
	2.144	3.450	KY 108 (Glen Dean Road / Kirk-Glen Dean Road)	
McQuady	5.606	9.022	KY 261	
	10.583	17.032	KY 992 east	South end of KY 992 overlap
	10.939	17.605	KY 992 west	North end of KY 992 overlap
Cloverport	17.458	28.096	US 60 / KY 144	
Cloverport	18.345	29.523	US 60 Bus. (West Main Street) / Elm Street	Northern terminus; continues beyond US 60 Bus. as Elm Street
1.000 mi = 1.609 km; 1.000 km = 0.621 mi
