= Irvington =

Irvington may refer to:

== Places ==
United States (cities, towns, villages, and unincorporated communities)

- Irvington, Alabama, an unincorporated community in Mobile County, Alabama
- Irvington, Illinois, a village in Washington County, Illinois
- Irvington Township, Washington County, Illinois, a township in Washington County, Illinois
- Irvington, Iowa
- Irvington, Kentucky, a city in Breckinridge County, Kentucky
- Irvington, Nebraska, an unincorporated community in Douglas County, Nebraska
- Irvington, New Jersey, a township in Essex County, New Jersey
- Irvington, New York, a village in the Town of Greenburgh, Westchester County, New York
- Irvington, Virginia, a town in Lancaster County, Virginia
- Irvington, Wisconsin, an unincorporated community in the Town of Menomonie, Dunn County, Wisconsin

United States (neighborhoods or districts)

- Irvington, Baltimore, neighborhood in the Southwest District of Baltimore, Maryland
- Irvington, Fremont, California, a historical town; now a district of the City of Fremont, Alameda County, California
- Irvington, Portland, Oregon, a neighborhood in the Northeast section of Portland, Oregon
- Irvington Historic District (Indianapolis, Indiana), a historic neighborhood in Indianapolis, Indiana

== Other ==
- Irvington (BART station), in Fremont, California
- Irvington Community School, in the Irvington Historic District of Indianapolis, Indiana
- Irvington Public Schools, a school district in Irvington, New Jersey
- Irvington Town Hall, in Irvington, New York

== See also ==
- Irvington High School (disambiguation)
- Irvington Historic District (disambiguation)
