= Kentucky Route 86 =

State highway in Kentucky, United States

Kentucky Route 86
- KY 86 highlighted in red

Route information
- Maintained by KYTC
- Length: 43.683 mi (70.301 km)

Major junctions
- West end: KY 144 in Union Star
- US 60 near Hardinsburg
- East end: US 62 near Cecilia

Location
- Country: United States
- State: Kentucky
- Counties: Breckinridge, Hardin

Highway system
- Kentucky State Highway System; Interstate; US; State; Parkways
← KY 85	→ KY 87

Kentucky Route 86 (KY 86) is a 43.683-mile-long (70.301 km) state highway in Kentucky that runs from KY 144 in the unincorporated community of Union Star to U.S. Route 62 (US 62) southeast of Cecilia.

== Major intersections ==
County	Location	mi	km	Destinations	Notes
Breckinridge	Union Star	0.000	0.000	KY 144	Western terminus
Breckinridge	Lodiburg	6.123	9.854	KY 261 north	West end of KY 261 overlap
Breckinridge		9.986	16.071	KY 2780 east (Webster-Clifton Mills Road)	Western terminus of KY 2780
Breckinridge		10.776	17.342	KY 261 south	East end of KY 261 overlap
Breckinridge	Garfield	15.957	25.680	US 60 west / KY 79 south	West end of US 60/KY 79 overlap
Breckinridge		17.358	27.935	US 60 east / KY 79 north	East end of US 60/KY 79 overlap
Breckinridge	Custer	23.366	37.604	KY 1401 west	Eastern terminus of KY 1401
Breckinridge	Custer	23.395	37.651	KY 690	
Breckinridge		26.717	42.997	KY 401 west / Dyer Cemetery Road	Eastern terminus of KY 401
Hardin		32.825	52.827	KY 920 (Salt River Road)	
Hardin		39.328	63.292	KY 1375 (Long Grove Road)	
Hardin		42.139	67.816	KY 253 north (Bethlehem Academy Road) / Lewis Lane	Southern terminus of KY 253
Hardin		43.683	70.301	US 62 (Leitchfield Road)	Eastern terminus
1.000 mi = 1.609 km; 1.000 km = 0.621 mi
