= Raymond, Kentucky =

Unincorporated community in Kentucky, United States

- Unincorporated community
- Location within Kentucky Location within the United States
- Coordinates: 37°56′20″N 86°21′55″W
- Country: United States
- State: Kentucky
- County: Breckinridge
- Elevation: 781 ft (238 m)
- Time zone: UTC-6 (Central (CST))
  - Summer (DST): UTC-5 (CDT)
- Area code: 270
- GNIS feature ID: 508906

Raymond is an unincorporated community in Breckinridge County, Kentucky, United States. Raymond is located along Kentucky Route 477, 6 miles (9.7 km) northwest of Irvington.
