= Irvington Historic District =

Irvington Historic District may refer to:

in the United States

(by state)

- Irvington Historic District (Indianapolis, Indiana)
- North Irvington Gardens Historic District, Indianapolis, Indiana
- Irvington Historic District (Irvington, Kentucky)
- Irvington Historic District (Irvington, New York)
- Irvington Historic District (Portland, Oregon)

== See also ==
- Irvington (disambiguation)
