= Sample, Kentucky =

Unincorporated community in Kentucky, United States

- Unincorporated community
- Location within Kentucky Location within the United States
- Coordinates: 37°54′16″N 86°28′52″W
- Country: United States
- State: Kentucky
- County: Breckinridge
- Elevation: 423 ft (129 m)
- Time zone: UTC-6 (Central (CST))
  - Summer (DST): UTC-5 (CDT)
- ZIP codes: 40163
- GNIS feature ID: 502882

Sample is an unincorporated community within Breckinridge County, Kentucky, United States. It was also known as Chicken Bristle.

== History ==
This community, which was located on the CSX Railroad line, north of Hardinsburg, was originally named "Chicken Bristle" because of the famous cockfights which were held there. People came from many other states and as far away as Chicago and New York City to attend the fights.

The Sample post office closed in 1992. The origin of the name "Sample" is obscure.
