= Joseph Holt House and Chapel =

Historic house in Kentucky, United States

- U.S. National Register of Historic Places
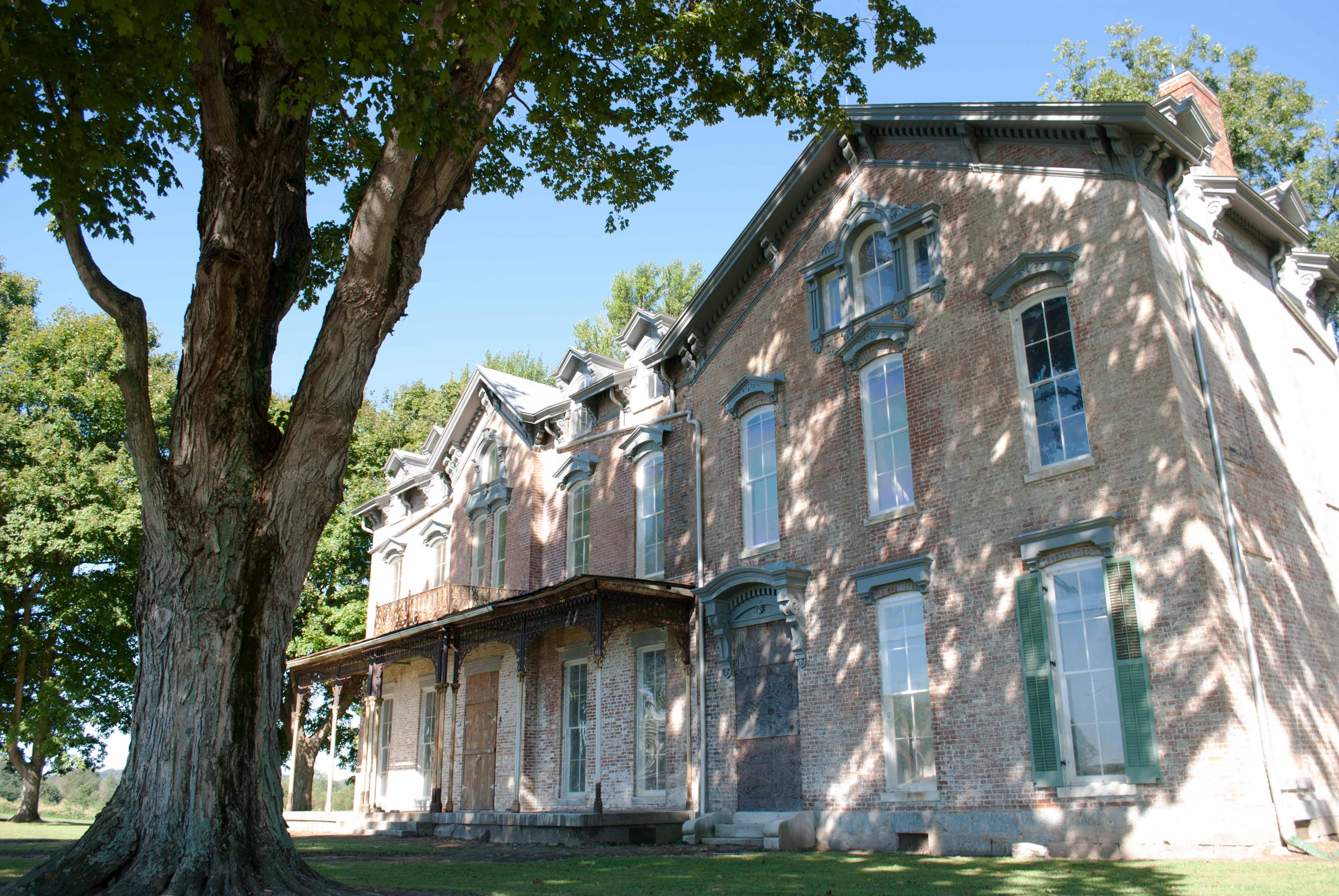

- Location within Kentucky Location within the United States
- Nearest city: Addison, Kentucky
- Coordinates: 37°54′38″N 86°34′39″W
- Area: 10 acres (4.0 ha)
- Built: 1850
- Architectural style: Italianate, Gothic Revival
- NRHP reference No.: 76000853
- Added to NRHP: July 12, 1976

The Joseph Holt House and Chapel, located in Breckinridge County, Kentucky southwest of Addison on Kentucky Route 144, was listed on the National Register of Historic Places in 1976.

The John Holt House was built in c. 1850 and has several elements of Italianate style. It is a two-and-a-half- or three-story building with first-floor ceilings 14 feet (4.3 m) high. It is built of brick, with walls 14 inches (0.36 m) thick.

The Holt Chapel, about 200 yards (180 m) southwest and across a road, is a Gothic Revival chapel built in 1871.
