= Mystique =

Mystique may refer to:

- Mystique (personality trait), a personality trait similar to charisma
- Mystique (character), a Marvel Comics character associated with the X-Men
- Mystique (film character), a character from the Marvel X-Men file series
- Mystique (casino), a casino/greyhound race track in Dubuque, Iowa, USA
- Mystique (company), producer of a number of pornographic video games for the Atari 2600 including Custer's Revenge
- Mystique (Blackpool Pleasure Beach), a former illusion show at Blackpool Pleasure Beach, Lancashire, England
- Mystique Ro, American skeleton racer
- Mystique Summers Madison, American drag queen
- Matrox Mystique, 2D, 3D and video acceleration card produced by Matrox in 1996/97
- Mercury Mystique, a compact car produced by the Ford Motor Company from 1995 to 2000
- Mis-Teeq, an English R&B group
- Music City Mystique, a Percussion Independent World (PIW) Drumline from Nashville, Tennessee
- Cure Mystique, one of the characters in Star Detective Precure!

== See also ==
- Mystic (disambiguation)
- Mustique
