= Holt, Kentucky =

Holt, Kentucky may refer to the following places in Kentucky:

- Holt, Breckinridge County, Kentucky
- Holt, Lawrence County, Kentucky
- Holt, Muhlenberg County, Kentucky
