= Webster, Kentucky =

Unincorporated community in Kentucky, United States

- Unincorporated community
- Location within Kentucky Location within the United States
- Coordinates: 37°53′20″N 86°20′20″W
- Country: United States
- State: Kentucky
- County: Breckinridge, Meade
- Elevation: 584 ft (178 m)

Population (2010)
  - Total: 931
- Time zone: UTC-6 (Central (CST))
  - Summer (DST): UTC-5 (CDT)
- ZIP code: 40176
- Area code: 270
- GNIS feature ID: 506341

Webster is an unincorporated community in Breckinridge County, Kentucky, United States, located at the junction of Kentucky Route 261, Kentucky Route 333, Kentucky Route 477, and Kentucky Route 2780, 3.1 miles (5.0 km) west of Irvington. Webster has a post office with ZIP code 40176, which opened on August 31, 1852. However, the Webster post office has closed permanently, with the mail being routed through Irvington, Kentucky.
