= Locust Hill, Virginia =

Locust Hill may refer to the following places in the U.S. state of Virginia:

- Locust Hill, Middlesex County, Virginia
- Locust Hill, Prince William County, Virginia
- Locust Hill, Wythe County, Virginia
