= Benjamin Sebastian =

American jurist

Justice of the Kentucky Court of Appeals
- In office December 28, 1792 – December 6, 1806
- Preceded by: Court established
- Succeeded by: Felix Grundy

Personal details
- Born: September 11, 1741 Falls Church, Virginia
- Died: November 20, 1832 (aged 91) Meade County, Kentucky

Military service
- Allegiance: United States
- Branch/service: United States Army
- Rank: Private
- Unit: 1st Virginia Regiment
- Battles/wars: American Revolutionary War

Benjamin Sebastian (June 11, 1741 – November 20, 1832) was a preacher, lawyer, merchant and one of the first judges on the Kentucky Court of Appeals, serving from the court's establishment in 1792 until his resignation in 1806.

He was a participant in the Spanish Conspiracy (also called the Burr Conspiracy), a plan by a cabal of US planters, politicians, and army officers including Aaron Burr to establish an independent country in the southwestern United States (including the state of Kentucky) and parts of Mexico, united with the Spanish government of Louisiana.

== Early life ==
Benjamin Sebastian Jr was born June 11, 1741, in Falls Church, Virginia, to Benjamin Sebastian and Priscilla Elkins. He married Amelia Broadwater on March 20, 1773, in Fairfax, Virginia.

During the American Revolutionary War, he served as a private in the 1st Virginia Regiment. After the revolution he moved to Kentucky. He was a lawyer practicing in Louisville, Kentucky by 1785. He served as a delegate to the constitutional convention in 1792. He was one of the first judges on the Kentucky Court of Appeals (1792–1806).

== Spanish Conspiracy ==
Sebastian was a participant in the Spanish Conspiracy (also called the Burr Conspiracy), a plan conceived during Kentucky's statehood conventions in the 1780s to unite with the Spanish government of Louisiana in order to open a trade route down the Mississippi River to New Orleans. Aaron Burr, Judge Harry Innes, James Wilkinson, and Benjamin Sebastian were all implicated in the conspiracy.

The conspiracy ended in 1795 after Spain ceded part of the Louisiana Territory and allowed the United States free navigation of the Mississippi River.

In 1806, it was discovered that Sebastian, while he was a member of the Kentucky Court of Appeals, was drawing a pension of $2,000 a year from King Charles of Spain, and on December 6, 1806, the Kentucky House of Representatives voted articles of impeachment against Judge Sebastian. His lawyer saw that it was a foregone conclusion that the senate would convict Sebastian, so he asked for a compromise, whereby the charges associated with the conspiracy would be dismissed if he would resign from the court. He did so the same day, after which Governor Christopher Greenup nominated Felix Grundy to take his seat on the bench.

== Later life ==
After leaving the Court of Appeals, Sebastian purchased land at Falls of Rough in Grayson County, on which he erected a grist mill and a saw mill in 1813.

He died on November 20, 1832, in Meade County, Kentucky.
