= Addison, Kentucky =

Unincorporated community in Kentucky, United States

- Unincorporated community
- Location within Kentucky Location within the United States
- Coordinates: 37°54′58″N 86°33′54″W
- Country: United States
- State: Kentucky
- County: Breckinridge
- Elevation: 420 ft (130 m)
- Time zone: UTC-6 (Central (CST))
  - Summer (DST): UTC-5 (CDT)
- Area codes: 270 & 364
- GNIS feature ID: 510220

Addison is an unincorporated community in Breckinridge County, Kentucky, United States. Addison is located on the Ohio River and Kentucky Route 144, 6.8 miles (10.9 km) north-northeast of Cloverport.

== History ==
The Holt post office opened at the site in 1880. The town of Holt (also known as Holt's Bottom) was named after the family of Judge Joseph Holt. Joseph Holt was appointed Commissioner of Patents in 1857, Postmaster General in 1859, and Secretary of War in 1860 during the Buchanan administration. He was appointed Judge Advocate General by President Abraham Lincoln and was the judge during the trial of the conspirators in the Lincoln assassination trial. Judge Holt's home, which is on the National Register of Historical Places, still stands in Addison and Judge Holt is buried in a private cemetery next to the home. There was also a school near the Holt home known as Holt School as well as a church known as Holt Chapel. Part of the town of Holt was renamed Addison in 1889 for the local postmaster, L. D. Addison. L. D. Addison not only ran the Addison post office and a store but he also opened a distillery in 1895 in Addison known as Old Breckinridge Whiskey. The Holt post office continued to operate from 1880 until 1958. The Addison post office, operated by postmistress Mae Harpe, closed in 1965.

Addison was also the location of Lock and Dam #45 on the Ohio river. The dam operated from 1927 until 1971 at which time it was demolished due to the construction of the Cannelton (Indiana) Lock and Dam that replaced it. Ten homes were built on a hill in Addison known as "The Reservation". They overlook the Ohio river and were homes to employees who worked at Lock and Dam #45 during the years it was in operation. Those homes still stand today and are occupied by private residents who enjoy the panoramic view of the Ohio river. The L & N railroad also runs between the riverside base of The Reservation and the Ohio river.

== Notable people ==
- L. D. Addison, owner of Old Breckinridge Whiskey distillery and town of Addison namesake. He operated first store and post office in Addison. Mr. Addison was married to Alice Setzer Addison (1862–1939). L.D. (Lloyd Dulany) Addison is buried in Cloverport, Ky in Cloverport Cemetery #1. Cloverport is located 10 miles from Addison, Ky down KY-144 W.
