= Cecilia, Kentucky =

Census-designated place in Kentucky, United States

- Census-designated place
- Location within Kentucky Location within the United States
- Coordinates: 37°39′57″N 85°57′24″W
- Country: United States
- State: Kentucky
- County: Hardin

Area
  - Total: 1.44 sq mi (3.72 km^{2})
  - Land: 1.43 sq mi (3.71 km^{2})
  - Water: 0.0077 sq mi (0.02 km^{2})
- Elevation: 705 ft (215 m)

Population (2020)
  - Total: 575
  - Density: 401.8/sq mi (155.12/km^{2})
- Time zone: UTC-5 (Eastern (EST))
  - Summer (DST): UTC-4 (EST)
- ZIP code: 42724
- Area codes: 270 & 364
- FIPS code: 21-13636
- GNIS feature ID: 489160

Cecilia is a census-designated place (CDP) and unincorporated community in Hardin County, Kentucky, United States. It is located 6 miles (10 km) west of Elizabethtown, the county seat. As of the 2020 Census, the population was 575, stagnant from the 2010 census population of 572.

The town was formerly called "Cecilian Junction" because of its location at the junction of the Illinois Central Railroad's Louisville-Paducah main line and its branch to Hodgenville. (The line now belongs to the Paducah and Louisville Railway, and the branch is now truncated to Elizabethtown.) The community is part of the Elizabethtown–Fort Knox Metropolitan Statistical Area, and a significant part of the area served by the Cecilia post office is now within the Elizabethtown city limits.

Kentucky Route 86 runs through the town, ending just south of the town at an intersection with U.S. Route 62.

== Demographics ==
Historical population
Census	Pop.	Note	%±
2010	572		—
2020	575		0.5%
U.S. Decennial Census

== Notable person ==
Cecilia is the home of Ron Lewis, who represented Kentucky's 2nd congressional district in the United States Congress between 1994 and 2009.
