= Falls of Rough Historic District =

Historic district in Kentucky, United States

- U.S. National Register of Historic Places
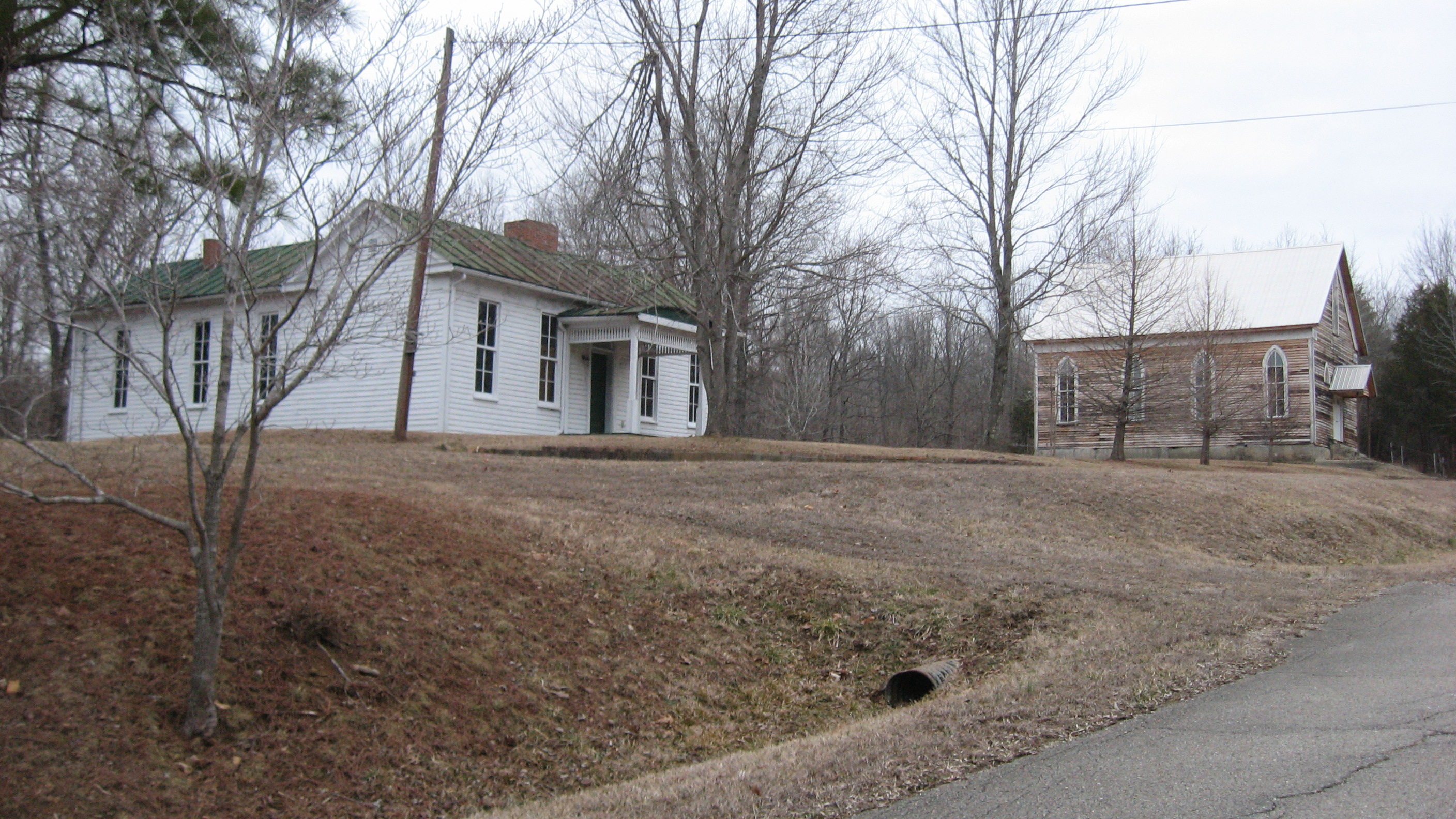

- Location within Kentucky Location within the United States
- Location: Kentucky Route 110, Falls of Rough, Kentucky
- Coordinates: 37°35′22″N 86°33′03″W
- Area: 50 acres (20 ha)
- Built: 1830
- Architectural style: Late Victorian, Gothic Revival, Arch-beam type bridge
- NRHP reference No.: 78001305
- Added to NRHP: January 31, 1978

The Falls of Rough Historic District, along Kentucky Route 110 in Falls of Rough, Kentucky, is a 50 acres (20 ha) historic district which was listed on the National Register of Historic Places in 1978. It included 10 contributing buildings, a contributing structure, and three contributing sites.

At its peak during 1900–1930, Falls of Rough was "a small but thriving western Kentucky town of around 250 inhabitants. It consisted of a complex of buildings that included a grist mill (c. 1830), a sawmill, a mill (c. 1890), a general store (c. 1880), a post office (c. 1905), a church (c. 1890) and parsonage, and the Green farm all built by the Green family." The district includes remnants of some of these. Another name proposed for the district was the "Green Family Farm Historic District".

The "visual center" of the district is the brick Willis Green House, built in 1830 and extensively modified in 1879. Its front facade brick is laid in Flemish bond; it rests upon a stone foundation.

The contributing structure in the district is an arch beam iron bridge spanning the Rough River, linking the Breckinridge County and Grayson County sides of the district.
