= Mook, Kentucky =

Unincorporated community in Kentucky, United States

- Unincorporated community
- Location within Kentucky Location within the United States
- Coordinates: 37°40′24″N 86°21′8″W
- Country: United States
- State: Kentucky
- County: Breckinridge
- Elevation: 764 ft (233 m)
- Time zone: UTC-6 (Central (CST))
  - Summer (DST): UTC-5 (CDT)
- GNIS feature ID: 508632

Mook is an unincorporated community located in Breckinridge County, Kentucky, United States.
