= Cloverport Independent Schools =

School district in Kentucky, United States

Cloverport Independent Schools is a school district serving Cloverport, Kentucky, and surrounding areas of far western Breckinridge County. The superintendent is Keith Haynes. The district also operates Kentucky Virtual Academy.

== Schools ==
=== Physical schools ===
- William H. Natcher Elementary School (Grades PK-5)
- Frederick Fraize Middle School (Grades 6–8)
- Cloverport High School (Grades 9–12)

=== Kentucky Virtual Academy ===
Kentucky Virtual Academy (KYVA) is a virtual school operating in Cloverport School District, which enrolls students from all over Kentucky. It opened in fall 2023. In the first two years of KYVA's operation, it far surpassed the rest of Cloverport's schools in attendance; Cloverport's in-person schools had about 275 students, while KYVA had 2,800. Cloverport's state funding from Kentucky, which is dependent on the student attendance in the district, also increased from about $1.8 million to $19 million due to KYVA.

In 2025, KYVA faced criticism from the Kentucky Department of Education and several state lawmakers for exceeding maximum class sizes and failing to administer required tests to students. The Department of Education supported capping virtual school attendance at 10% of a school district's in-person enrollment, but the state legislature passed a bill preventing such a cap being implemented.
