= William Hardin =

- Born: c. 1745; Augusta County, Virginia, U.S.
- Died: 1821; Hardinsburg, Kentucky, U.S.
- Other names: "Big Bill"; "Indian Bill"
- Known for: Founder of Hardinsburg, Kentucky
- Relatives: John Hardin; Martin D. Hardin; Benjamin Hardin

Captain William Hardin (c. 1745 – July 22, 1821) was an American soldier, farmer, and founder of Hardinsburg, Kentucky. Known as "Big Bill" or "Indian Bill", he was related to Colonel John Hardin, for whom Hardin County, Kentucky, was named.

== Family and early life ==
William Hardin was born in Augusta County, Virginia, around 1745. His family was of French Huguenot origin. In 1765, he moved with his parents from Fauquier County, Virginia, to Pennsylvania, and settled on the Monongahela River.

Hardin married Winifred "Winnie" Ann Holtzclaw in 1768. She was born in 1752 in Prince William County, Virginia to parents Johann Heinrich "Henry" Holtzclaw and Anne "Nancy" Hardin. In addition to their nine children, Winifred and William Hardin also raised a niece and nephew. Among their children was William Hardin Jr., born in 1781, who was a member of the legislature of Kentucky and postmaster in Frankfort for many years. After Winifred died in 1807, in 1808 Hardin married Susannah McGhee (McGee) in Breckinridge County. Susannah and William had two daughters: Hannah Ann and Lucinda. After William Hardin died, Susannah married Robert Armstrong.

Hardin served in the American Revolutionary War as a private in the 3rd Virginia Regiment and the 5th Virginia Regiment.

== Founding of Hardinsburg ==
In August 1779, William Hardin came to explore Kentucky. With him was a man named Sinclair, as well as Christopher Bush (father of Sarah Bush Lincoln) and Michael Leonard. They descended the Ohio River, arriving at the falls of the Ohio (modern day Louisville, Kentucky), where there was already a settlement. Not liking the swampy nature of the country, the party continued down the Ohio, reaching the mouth of Sinking Creek, where they landed with the intention of exploring the adjacent country. While exploring, they were pursued by a party of Native Americans. Hardin and his men headed toward the safety of Hines' Fort, the site of present-day Elizabethtown, Kentucky. They were attacked en route, most likely near present-day Big Spring, Kentucky. Sinclair was killed; Hardin and the others made it safely to Hines' Fort. Hardin remained at the fort until the following spring, when he, Bush and Leonard returned to the falls of the Ohio. From there they explored Kentucky in a southeasterly direction, and finally reached the present site of Hardinsburg. Pleased with the location, Hardin and his men built Fort Hardin, also known as Hardin's Station, from which Hardinsburg would emerge. Hardin went back to Pennsylvania and brought more families to Kentucky.

Hardin became known as "Indian Bill" by Kentucky settlers, due to his hostility to Natives; among the Natives he was known as "Big Bill" because of his large stature. In 1786, at the outset of the Northwest Indian War, Hardin led an expedition of about eighty men against Shawnees on the Saline River in present-day Illinois. When Hardin and his men found a Shawnee encampment guarded by only three warriors, they opened fire and killed them. The Kentuckians then ambushed the other Shawnees when they returned to camp. Hardin was shot through both thighs at the outset of the skirmish, but he sat on a log and continued to direct his men. After the battle, Hardin's men retreated back across the Ohio River, carrying the badly wounded Hardin. They eventually made it to Fort Vienna (present-day Calhoun, Kentucky), where Hardin recuperated before returning to Hardin's Station.

== Death ==
Hardin died on July 22, 1821, in Hardinsburg. The location of his grave is unknown. Hardin's house stood on the bluff overlooking Hardin's Creek in the southern part of Hardinsburg, and for many years, was a well-known landmark. Hardin once owned a great deal of land in the present-day counties of Breckinridge, Hardin, Meade, Grayson, Ohio, and Hancock. However, his house burned down, destroying his deeds and patents and causing him to lose most of the land he was entitled to.
