= Locust Hill, Kentucky =

Unincorporated community in Kentucky, United States

- Unincorporated community
- Location within Kentucky Location within the United States
- Coordinates: 37°43′40″N 86°21′24″W
- Country: United States
- State: Kentucky
- County: Breckinridge
- Elevation: 614 ft (187 m)
- Time zone: UTC-6 (Central (CST))
  - Summer (DST): UTC-5 (CDT)
- Zip code: 40151
- Area code: 270
- GNIS feature ID: 508488

Locust Hill is an unincorporated community in Breckinridge County, Kentucky, United States. Locust Hill is located at the junction of Kentucky Route 1073 and Kentucky Route 1401, 6.7 miles (10.8 km) east-southeast of Hardinsburg. Locust Hill had a post office from June 4, 1909, to February 22, 1985.
