= Se Ree, Kentucky =

Unincorporated community in Kentucky, United States

- Unincorporated community
- Location within Kentucky Location within the United States
- Coordinates: 37°41′00″N 86°22′47″W
- Country: United States
- State: Kentucky
- County: Breckinridge
- Elevation: 722 ft (220 m)
- Time zone: UTC-6 (Central (CST))
  - Summer (DST): UTC-5 (CDT)
- ZIP codes: 40164
- GNIS feature ID: 503129

Se Ree is an unincorporated community within Breckinridge County, Kentucky, United States.

The community had a post office that closed on January 3, 2004.
