= McQuady, Kentucky =

Unincorporated community in Kentucky, United States

- Unincorporated community
- Location within Kentucky Location within the United States
- Coordinates: 37°42′30″N 86°31′08″W
- Country: United States
- State: Kentucky
- County: Breckinridge
- Elevation: 676 ft (206 m)
- Time zone: UTC-6 (Central (CST))
  - Summer (DST): UTC-5 (CDT)
- ZIP code: 40153
- Area code: 270
- GNIS feature ID: 497945

McQuady is an unincorporated community in Breckinridge County, Kentucky, United States. McQuady is located at the junction of Kentucky Route 105 and Kentucky Route 261, 5.9 miles (9.5 km) south-southwest of Hardinsburg. McQuady has a post office with ZIP code 40153.

Its original name was "Jolly Station", for Nelson Jolly, a local landowner. It was named for the town's first postmaster, Anne McQuady.

A line of the Louisville, Hardinsburg, & Western Railroad running through the town was completed in 1890. It eventually became a branch of the Louisville, Henderson, & St. Louis Railroad.

Soon after the completion of the railroad through town, Baptist residents founded Corinth Baptist church.

In 1910, St. Mary of the Woods Roman Catholic church was moved into town. The church operated a high school from 1922 to 1932 and an elementary school from 1922 to 1967. The schools were staffed by Dominican Sisters of St. Catherine.
