= Tar Fork, Kentucky =

Unincorporated community in Kentucky, United States

- Unincorporated community
- Location within Kentucky Location within the United States
- Coordinates: 37°43′14″N 86°36′6″W
- Country: United States
- State: Kentucky
- County: Breckinridge
- Elevation: 689 ft (210 m)
- Time zone: UTC-6 (Central (CST))
  - Summer (DST): UTC-5 (CDT)
- GNIS feature ID: 509186

Tar Fork is an unincorporated community within Breckinridge County, Kentucky, United States.
