= Mount Merino, Kentucky =

- Unincorporated community
- Location within Kentucky Location within the United States
- Coordinates: 37°53′48.2″N 86°17′4.9″W
- Country: United States
- State: Kentucky
- County: Breckinridge
- Elevation: 643 ft (196 m)
- Time zone: UTC-6 (Central (CST))
  - Summer (DST): UTC-5 (CDT)
- Area codes: 270 & 364
- GNIS feature ID: 498771

Mount Merino, Kentucky is an unincorporated community near Irvington in Breckinridge County, Kentucky.

== History ==
The community can trace its founding to 1832 when two brothers, Dr. Benedict Wathen and Dr. Richard M. Wathen, purchased the land and helped establish a Roman Catholic seminary there in 1838. The school closed in 1843 and in 1854 the Mount Merino farm became the home for the Holy Guardian Angel Catholic Church, a mission of St. Theresa Parish at Rhodelia. In 1930 it was decided to build a new church in Irvington as the old church needed many repairs and to be closer to the population center.
