= Mattingly, Kentucky =

Unincorporated community in Kentucky, United States

- Unincorporated community
- Location within Kentucky Location within the United States
- Coordinates: 37°45′46″N 86°36′07″W
- Country: United States
- State: Kentucky
- County: Breckinridge
- Elevation: 751 ft (229 m)
- Time zone: UTC-6 (Central (CST))
  - Summer (DST): UTC-5 (CDT)
- Area code: 270
- GNIS feature ID: 508560

Mattingly is an unincorporated community in Breckinridge County, Kentucky, United States. Mattingly is located around the intersection of Kentucky Route 992 and Kentucky Route 629, 7.9 miles (12.7 km) west of Hardinsburg.

== History ==
Its original name was Balltown, prior to the post office opening there in 1881. Some of the early settlers were the Balls, Bateses, Franks, Harrises, McQuadys, Mullens and Pates. The name Mattingly probably comes from the name of its first post master.
