= Constantine, Kentucky =

Unincorporated community in Kentucky, United States

- Unincorporated community
- Location within Kentucky Location within the United States
- Coordinates: 37°40′31.2″N 86°14′10.9″W
- Country: United States
- State: Kentucky
- County: Breckinridge
- Elevation: 804 ft (245 m)
- Time zone: UTC-6 (Central (CST))
  - Summer (DST): UTC-5 (CDT)
- Zip code: 40114
- Area codes: 270 & 364
- GNIS feature ID: 489989

Constantine, Kentucky is an unincorporated community in Breckinridge County, Kentucky.

The community had a post office from January 16, 1828, to September 16, 1995.
