= St. Augustine Catholic Church (Grayson Springs, Kentucky) =

Historic church in Kentucky, United States

- U.S. National Register of Historic Places
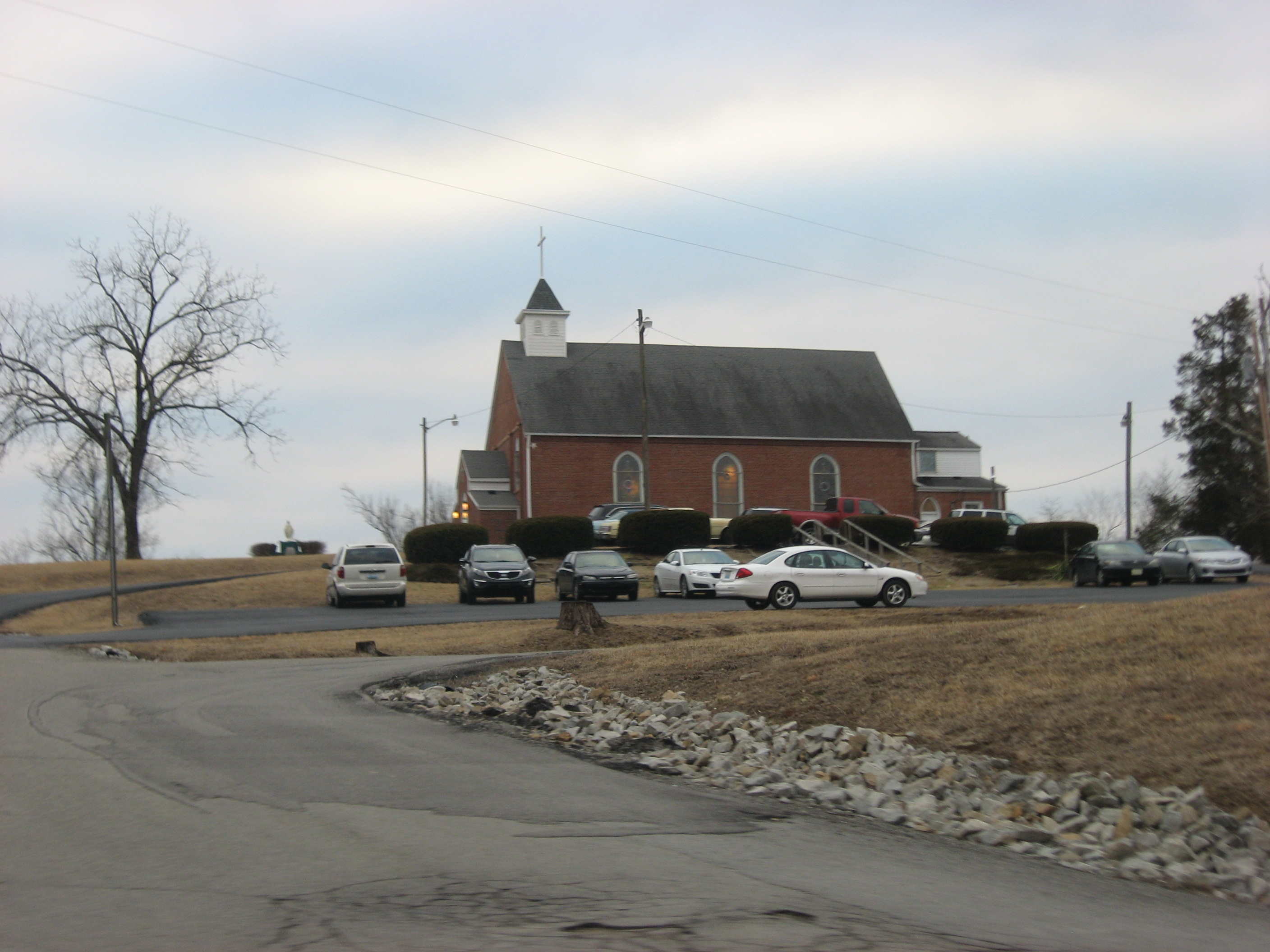
- Eastern side

- Location within Kentucky Location within the United States
- Nearest city: 1256 St Anthony Church Rd., Grayson Springs, Kentucky
- Coordinates: 37°27′1″N 86°13′57″W
- Built: 1854
- Architect: J.D. Key
- Architectural style: Greek Revival, Gothic
- NRHP reference No.: 89000259
- Added to NRHP: April 7, 1989

St. Augustine Catholic Church is a parish of the Roman Catholic Church near Clarkson, Kentucky, in the Eastern Deanery of the Diocese of Owensboro. It is noted for its historic parish church at 30 St Augustine Church Road in Grayson Springs. Built in 1854, it was added to the National Register of Historic Places on April 7, 1989.
