= Roff, Kentucky =

Unincorporated community in Kentucky, United States

- Unincorporated community
- Location within Kentucky Location within the United States
- Coordinates: 37°39′37″N 86°25′23″W
- Country: United States
- State: Kentucky
- County: Breckinridge
- Elevation: 686 ft (209 m)
- Time zone: UTC-6 (Central (CST))
  - Summer (DST): UTC-5 (CDT)
- Area code: 270
- GNIS feature ID: 502271

Roff is an unincorporated community in Breckinridge County, Kentucky, United States. Roff is located on Kentucky Route 79, 8.5 miles (13.7 km) south-southeast of Hardinsburg.
