= Garfield, Kentucky =

Unincorporated community in Kentucky, United States

- Unincorporated community
- Location within Kentucky
- Coordinates: 37°46′58″N 86°21′27″W
- Country: United States
- State: Kentucky
- County: Breckinridge
- Elevation: 804 ft (245 m)
- Time zone: UTC-6 (Central (CST))
  - Summer (DST): UTC-5 (CDT)
- ZIP code: 40140
- Area code: 270
- GNIS feature ID: 492703

Garfield is an unincorporated community in Breckinridge County, Kentucky, United States.

A post office was established in the community in 1880 and named for the candidate and future president James A. Garfield. A previous post office had been in the community from 1862 to 1866 and was known as Prince of Wales, Kentucky with the postmaster being Hopkins D. Wales. The community had asphalt mines, an inn, churches and a stage coach stop. Abraham Lincoln stayed at the inn as a child in 1816 when the family was moving to Indiana. According to tradition, the slaves at the inn refused to eat with the poor white trash Lincoln.

The community sits at the junction of U.S. Highway 60 and Kentucky Route 86.
