= Mystic =

A mystic is a person who practices mysticism, or a reference to a mystery, mystic craft, first hand-experience or the occult.

Mystic may also refer to:

== Arts, entertainment ==
=== Books and comics ===
- Ms. Mystic, comic book superheroine
- Mystic (comics), a CrossGen publication
- Mystic Comics, a Timely Comics publication

=== Film and television ===
- Mystics, a race shown in the film The Dark Crystal
- The Mystic, a 1925 film directed by Tod Browning
- Mystics (film), a 2003 film directed by David Blair
- Mystic (TV series), a 2020 television series based on the Pony Club Secrets series of books

=== Music ===
- Mystic Production, a record label from Poland
- Mystic Records, a record label based in Oceanside, California, U.S.
- Mystic (singer) (born 1974), hip hop singer from San Francisco, U.S.
- "Mystic", song by Prodigy from Hegelian Dialectic
- "Mystik", song by Tash Sultana from the album Flow State
- The Mystics, a singing group which began in Brooklyn, New York, U.S.

== Places ==
=== United States ===
- Mystic, California, a place in Nevada County
- Mystic, Colorado, a ghost town
- Mystic, Connecticut, a village in New London County
- Mystic, Iowa, a city in Appanoose County
- Mystic, Kentucky, an unincorporated community
- Mystic, Michigan, a ghost town
- Mystic, South Dakota, an unincorporated community
- Mystic Island, New Jersey, a census-designated place
- Mystic River, a river in eastern Massachusetts
- Mystic River (Connecticut), a river in southeastern Connecticut
- Mystic Seaport, the Museum of America and the Sea in Mystic, Connecticut
- Old Mystic, Connecticut, an unincorporated community in New London County

=== Other places ===
- Mystic, a settlement in the municipality of Saint-Ignace-de-Stanbridge, Quebec, Canada

== Ships ==
- HMS Mystic, two ships of the Royal Navy
- USS Mystic (1853), a ship of the United States Navy
- DSRV-1 Mystic, a 1970 rescue submersible of the United States Navy

== Sports ==
- Northern Mystics, a New Zealand netball team
- Washington Mystics, a U.S. professional women's basketball team

== Other uses ==
- List of female mystics
- Mystic BBS, a bulletin board software program
- MYSTIC (surveillance program), U.S. National Security Agency government voice interception system
- Team Mystic, a team on Pokémon Go
- Mystic mission/operation, another term for a clandestine operation

== See also ==
- Mistick, an old name for parts of Malden and Medford, Massachusetts
- Digital Mystikz, an electronic outfit made up of Mala and Coki from London, England
- MISTIC, computer system at Michigan State University from 1956
- Mystic River (disambiguation)
