= Mystic River (disambiguation) =

The Mystic River is in eastern Massachusetts, US.

Mystic River may also refer to:

- Mystic River (Connecticut), in southeastern Connecticut, US

== Other uses ==
- Mystic River (novel), by Dennis Lehane
- Mystic River (film), directed by Clint Eastwood and based on the novel
- Mystic River Rugby Club, a rugby club from Malden, Massachusetts, US
- The Mystic River, a Nigerian TV show

== See also ==
- Mystic (disambiguation)
