= John Daniel Rather House =

Historic house in Alabama, United States

- U.S. National Register of Historic Places
- Alabama Register of Landmarks and Heritage
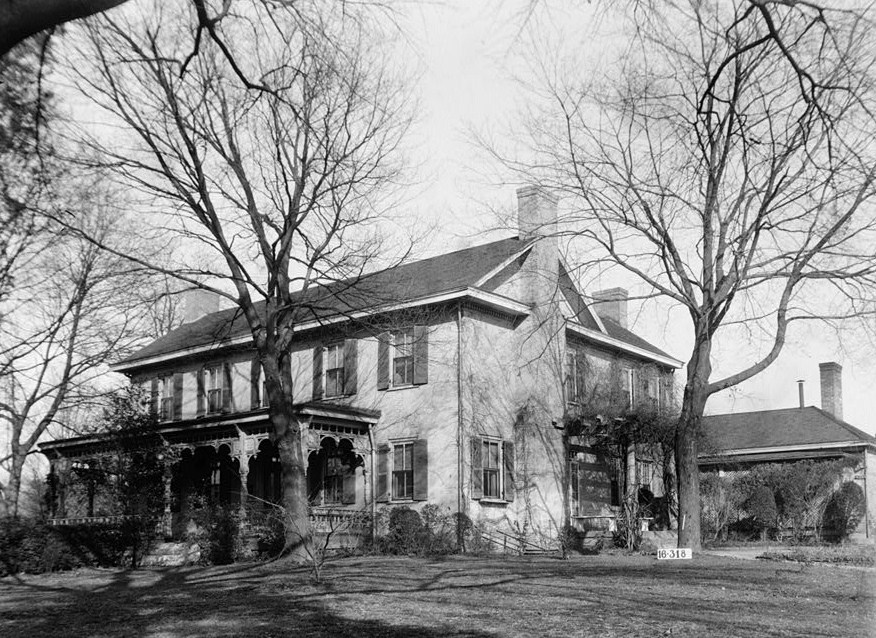
- The house in a 1934 HABS photo

- Location within Alabama Location within the United States
- Location: 209 S. Cave St., Tuscumbia, Alabama
- Coordinates: 34°43′50″N 87°41′56″W
- Area: less than one acre
- Built: 1823
- Architectural style: Federal
- NRHP reference No.: 82001603

Significant dates
- Added to NRHP: December 16, 1982
- Designated ARLH: October 4, 1978

The John Daniel Rather House (also known as Locust Hill) is a historic residence in Tuscumbia, Alabama, United States. The house was built in 1823 by William H. and Catherine Winter, who came to The Shoals from Prince William County, Virginia. It was taken over by the Union Army during the Civil War and used as the headquarters of General Florence M. Cornyn. After the war, the house was purchased by John Taylor Rather, an early North Alabama settler who was deputy sheriff of Madison County, and a longtime member of the Alabama House of Representatives and later the Alabama Senate. His son, John Daniel Rather, also served in both houses of the state legislature, and was President of the Memphis and Charleston Railroad.

The house is built in Federal style, and is two stories with chimneys in each gable end. The white-painted brick is laid in Flemish bond on the west and south sides that face Cave and 7th Streets. All windows are two-over-two sashes, and the main entrance is a double leaf door with moulded trim and a transom. An Eastlake porch was later added to the front and north façades. The porch features elaborate panels with floral designs, brackets with acorn pendants, and turned, spool-shaped posts. Two original mantels remain, one Adamesque and one Federal, while two replacement mantels are Classical Revival and Victorian.

The house was listed on the Alabama Register of Landmarks and Heritage in 1978 and the National Register of Historic Places in 1982.
