= Skillman House =

Historic house in Kentucky, United States

- U.S. National Register of Historic Places
- Location within Kentucky Location within the United States
- Location: Tile Plant Rd., Cloverport, Kentucky
- Coordinates: 37°50′28″N 86°37′23″W
- Area: 6 acres (2.4 ha)
- Built: 1876
- Architectural style: Italianate
- MPS: Cloverport MRA
- NRHP reference No.: 83002592
- Added to NRHP: June 21, 1983

The Skillman House, located on Tile Plant Rd. in Cloverport, Kentucky, was built in 1876. It was listed on the National Register of Historic Places in 1983.

It looks out over the Ohio River. It is a two-story brick building, with brick laid in common bond, which is Italianate in style. The listing included six contributing buildings.
