= Oglesby-Conrad House =

Historic house in Kentucky, United States

- Oglesby-Conrad
- U.S. National Register of Historic Places
- Location within Kentucky Location within the United States
- Location: Off U.S. 60, Cloverport, Kentucky
- Coordinates: 37°49′57″N 86°38′53″W
- Area: 1 acre (0.40 ha)
- Built: c.1825
- Architectural style: Federal
- MPS: Cloverport MRA
- NRHP reference No.: 83002591
- Added to NRHP: June 21, 1983

The Oglesby-Conrad House, located off U.S. Route 60 in Cloverport, Kentucky, was listed on the National Register of Historic Places in 1983.

It is a one-and-a-half-story brick house built c.1825, with brick of front and west facades laid in Flemish bond. It is notable as a Federal-style brick house.
