= Irvington High School =

Irvington High School may refer to the following schools in USA:

- Irvington High School (Fremont, California)
- Irvington High School (New Jersey), Irvington
- Irvington High School (New York), Irvington
