= Bobbi Jordan =

American actress

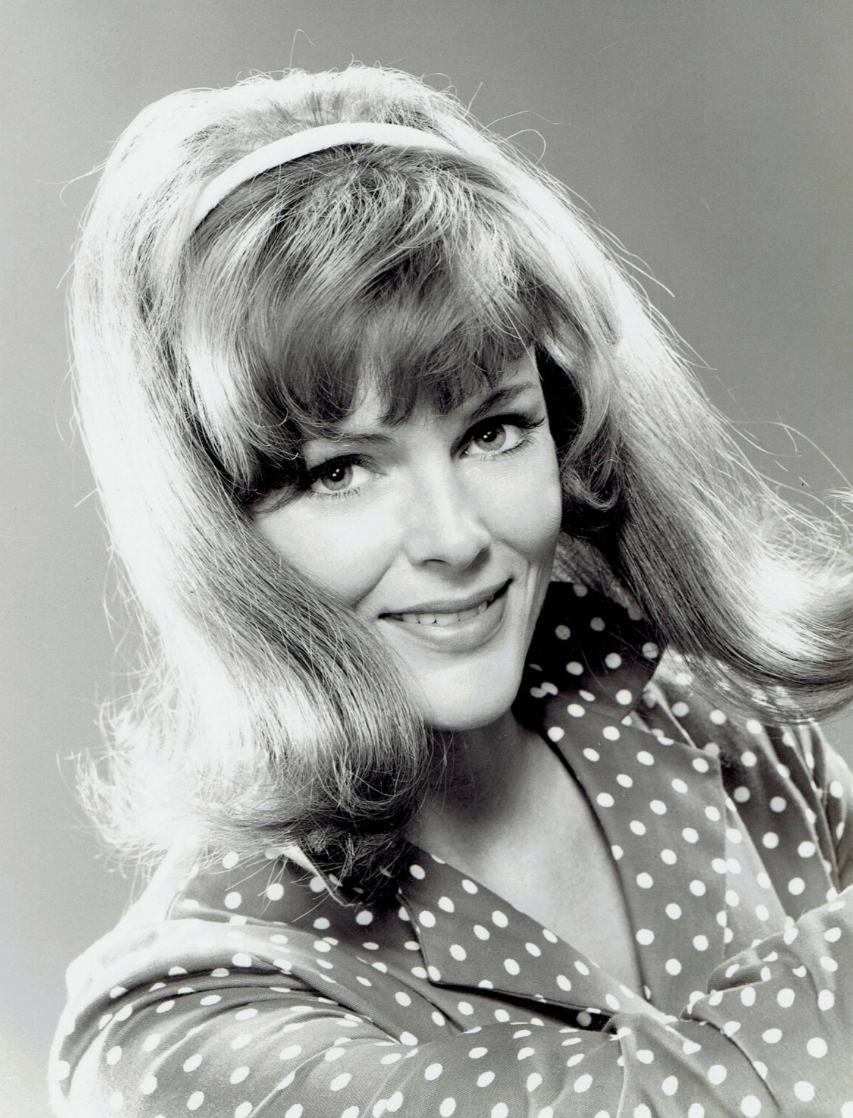
- Jordan in Blondie, 1968
- Born: Roberta Carol Bartlett; July 11, 1937; Hardinsburg, Kentucky, U.S.
- Died: November 9, 2012 (aged 75); Encinitas, California, U.S.
- Other names: Roberta Carol Jordan; Bobbie Jordan
- Occupation: Actress
- Years active: 1966–1993

Roberta Carol "Bobbi" Jordan (née Bartlett; July 11, 1937 – November 9, 2012) was an American actress whose television and film credits included the soap opera General Hospital and the 1974 musical film Mame. Her name is sometimes seen as Bobbie Jordan.

== Early years ==
Jordan was born Bobbie Carol Bartlett and was raised in Hardinsburg, Kentucky, the daughter of Dixie (nee Jones) and Elgin Grigsby Bartlett, the manager of a local restaurant. Her parents divorced in 1950, while living in Louisville. She moved from Kentucky to Chicago, and then to Los Angeles, originally to study and pursue opera. Jordan had to take jobs as a waitress in California. A club manager overheard her singing in the kitchen and offered her a role in the club's musical. She was given the lead in the club's Cinderella production, which soon led to a contract with the William Morris talent agency.

== Acting ==
Jordan debuted as a series regular in a 1966 ABC television series, The Rounders, in the role of Ada. She also co-starred in the role of Tootsie Woodley in the CBS series Blondie, beginning in 1968.

She later co-starred as Terri Webber Arnett, a singer and former nightclub singer, on General Hospital during the mid-1970s. She remained as a series regular on General Hospital from March 1976 until September 1977. Jordan was also a series regular in the role of Estelle on the short-lived CBS series Joe and Sons, and she played Judy Overmeyer in the 1978–1979 NBC sitcom, Turnabout, written by Steven Bochco.

She appeared in guest roles on The Odd Couple, Charlie's Angels, Adam-12,Diff'rent Strokes, One Day at a Time, Quincy M.E., Nero Wolfe, Highway to Heaven, The Man From U.N.C.L.E., The Wild Wild West, Love, American Style, and Ironside.

Jordan pursued film roles as well. She was cast as a waitress in the 1967 film A Guide for the Married Man, starring Walter Matthau. She also was featured in Mame, a 1974 musical starring Lucille Ball and Bea Arthur, as an Irish maid who ends up marrying Mame's ward, her nephew Patrick Dennis.

She remained a stage actress throughout her career, including a leading role in the first national tour of the musical comedy Company, by Stephen Sondheim. Her additional credits included South Pacific, Guys and Dolls, and Damn Yankees.

== Death ==
Jordan died of a heart attack at her home in Encinitas, California on November 9, 2012, at the age of 75. She was predeceased by her husband of 43 years, television writer William "Bill" Jacobson (September 22, 1919 – July 19, 2011), whom she married on October 23, 1968. Jacobson had been the lead writer for The Kate Smith Show in 1960. She was survived by her son, screenwriter Jordan Roberts (born Bruce Robert Jordan on June 19, 1957), two grandchildren, Brandon and Cameron, and her stepdaughter, Jessie Jacobson.
