= Locust Hill, Prince William County, Virginia =

Locust Hill, Virginia
- Unincorporated community
- Location within Virginia Location within the United States
- Coordinates: 38°39′13″N 77°29′28″W
- Country: United States
- State: Virginia
- County: Prince William
- Elevation: 246 ft (75 m)
- Time zone: UTC-5 (Eastern (EST))
  - Summer (DST): UTC-4 (EDT)
- Area code(s): 571 & 703
- GNIS feature ID: 1761039

Locust Hill is an unincorporated community in Prince William County, Virginia, United States. Locust Hill is 6.8 miles (10.9 km) south of Manassas.
