= Walnut Grove School (Caneyville, Kentucky) =

- U.S. National Register of Historic Places
- Location within Kentucky Location within the United States
- Location: 1.5 miles (2.4 km) west of Caneyville, Kentucky
- Coordinates: 37°26′38″N 86°30′18″W
- Area: 3 acres (1.2 ha)
- Built: 1911
- NRHP reference No.: 87002516
- Added to NRHP: February 2, 1988

The Walnut Grove School, on Walnut Grove Rd. near Caneyville, Kentucky, was built in 1911. It was listed on the National Register of Historic Places in 1988.

It is a wood frame one-room schoolhouse 30 by 24.5 feet (9.1 m × 7.5 m) in plan.
