= Locust Hill, Wythe County, Virginia =

Locust Hill, Virginia
- Unincorporated community
- Location within Virginia Location within the United States
- Coordinates: 36°57′30″N 80°54′54″W
- Country: United States
- State: Virginia
- County: Wythe
- Elevation: 2,051 ft (625 m)
- Time zone: UTC-5 (Eastern (EST))
  - Summer (DST): UTC-4 (EDT)
- Area code: 276
- GNIS feature ID: 1495858

Locust Hill is an unincorporated community in Wythe County, Virginia, United States. Locust Hill is 9.4 miles (15.1 km) east of Wytheville.

More Info
