= Cloverport Historic District =

Historic district in Kentucky, United States

- U.S. National Register of Historic Places
- U.S. Historic district
- Location within Kentucky Location within the United States
- Location: Roughly bounded by 3rd, Main, Chestnut, and Lynn Sts., Cloverport, Kentucky
- Coordinates: 37°50′11″N 86°37′54″W
- Area: 77 acres (31 ha)
- MPS: Cloverport MRA
- NRHP reference No.: 83002589
- Added to NRHP: June 21, 1983

The Cloverport Historic District in Cloverport, Kentucky is a 77 acres (31 ha) historic district which is roughly bounded by 3rd, Main, Chestnut, and Lynn Streets. It was listed on the National Register of Historic Places in 1983. It included 115 contributing buildings and a contributing structure.

The boundaries of the district were drawn to "encompass all of Cloverport's nineteenth century and early twentieth century commercial, residential and religious buildings which comprise a historic entity and an architectural unity."
