= Mystic, Kentucky =

Unincorporated community in Kentucky, United States

- Unincorporated community
- Location within Kentucky Location within the United States
- Coordinates: 37°53′49″N 86°26′34″W
- Country: United States
- State: Kentucky
- County: Breckinridge
- Elevation: 417 ft (127 m)
- Time zone: UTC-6 (Central (CST))
  - Summer (DST): UTC-5 (CDT)
- ZIP codes: 40156
- Area code: 270
- GNIS feature ID: 508668

Mystic is an unincorporated community within Breckinridge County, Kentucky, United States.

== History ==
Limestone rock is the resource that a town coalesced at Mystic. Mystic's original named was "Pierce".

Dry Valley Baptist Church is located in Mystic.

The community had a post office from 1904 to 1964.
