= Jack Thomas House =

- U.S. National Register of Historic Places
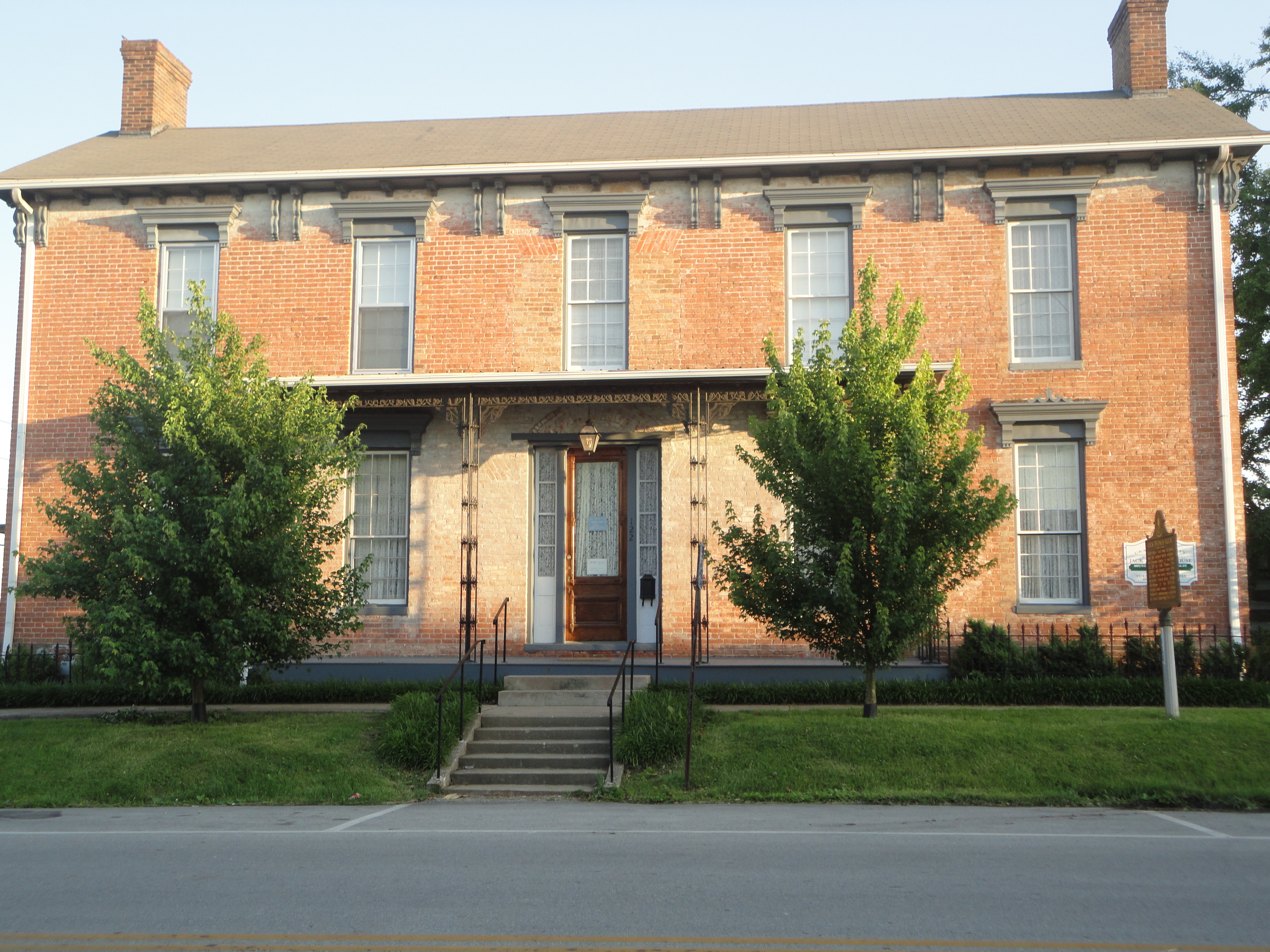

- Location within Kentucky Location within the United States
- Location: 108 E. Main St., Leitchfield, Kentucky
- Coordinates: 37°28′48″N 86°17′33″W
- Area: 2 acres (0.81 ha)
- Built: 1810
- Architectural style: Late Victorian, Federal
- NRHP reference No.: 76000890
- Added to NRHP: April 21, 1976

The Jack Thomas House, at 108 E. Main St. in Leitchfield, Kentucky was built in 1810. It was listed on the National Register of Historic Places in 1976.

It has been known as the oldest brick house in Leitchfield, on the basis of its original one-story brick section which later served as a rear ell off the main block, built later. The main block is a two-story five-bay brick section, with its front door and window above having originally been in Palladian window format.

It has also been known as The Gardner Place.

It was built in 1812–14 by Jack Thomas, who eventually was clerk for Grayson County for 41 years. It was built with two rooms downstairs and a loft above. It was expanded in 1925 with rooms upstairs and downstairs. It was later owned by William Evans, who operated a general store. It was sold in 1884 to George H. ("Bent") Gardner, founder and president of the Leitchfield Deposit Bank.
