= Irvington Historic District (Irvington, Kentucky) =

Historic district in Kentucky, United States

- U.S. National Register of Historic Places
- U.S. Historic district
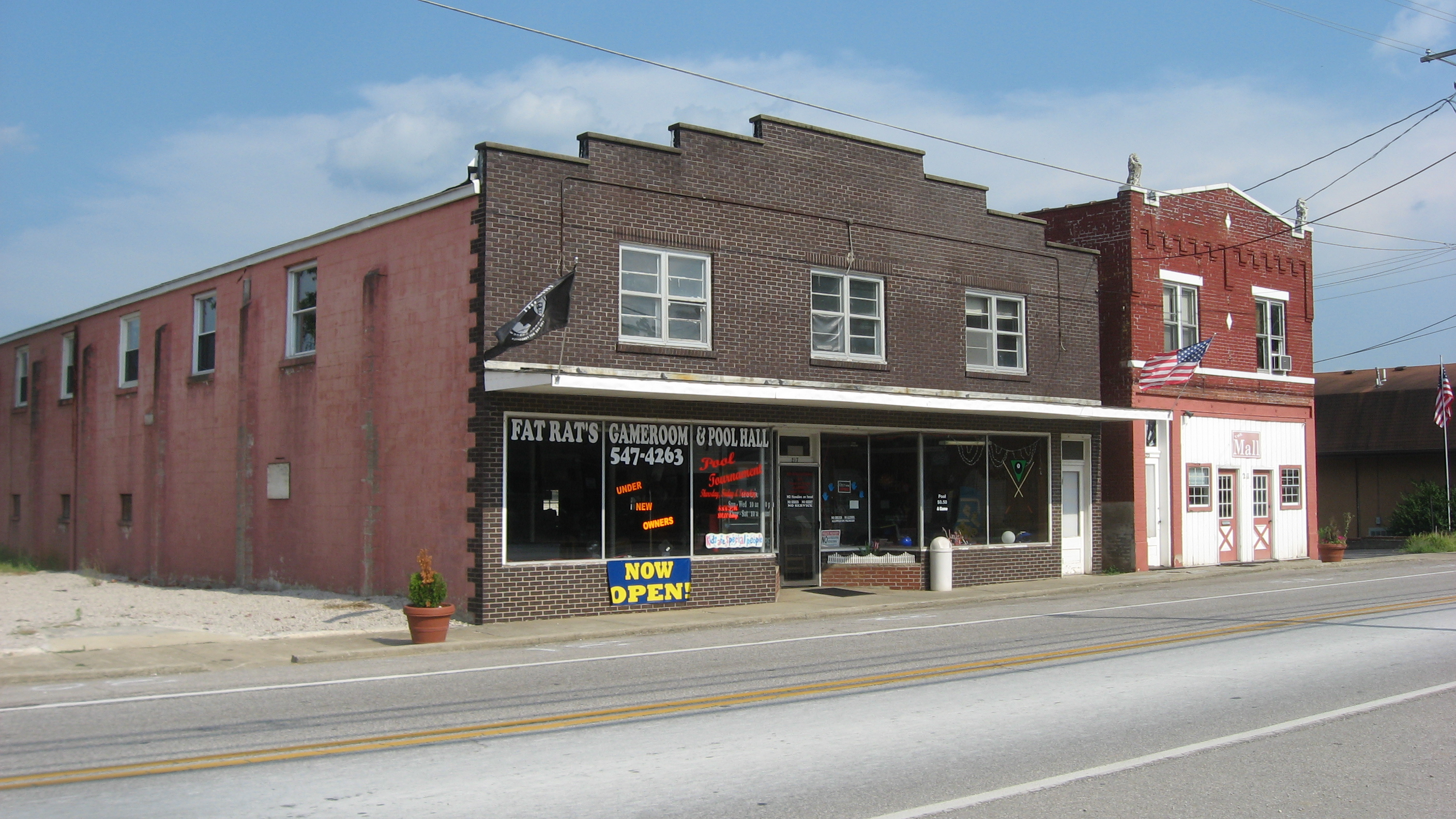

- Location within Kentucky Location within the United States
- Location: Roughly bounded by CSX tracks, Third, Caroline and Walnut Sts., Irvington, Kentucky
- Coordinates: 37°52′56″N 86°17′04″W
- Area: 12.6 acres (5.1 ha)
- Built: 1888
- Architectural style: Early Commercial, Late 19th and Early 20th Century American Movements
- NRHP reference No.: 97001342
- Added to NRHP: June 29, 1998

The Irvington Historic District in Irvington, Kentucky is a 12.6 acres (5.1 ha) historic district which was listed on the National Register of Historic Places in 1998.

It is roughly bounded by CSX tracks, Third, Caroline and Walnut Streets. It included 20 contributing buildings, 12 contributing structures, and three contributing sites. Interspersed are fourteen non-contributing buildings and a non-contributing site. It even included a U.S. Post Office.

It was deemed significant as the "most cohesive group of early commercial buildings that formed one of Breckinridge County's most prosperous railroad towns that continues to thrive today." Most of the buildings are one- and two-story brick structures.
