= Holt, Breckinridge County, Kentucky =

Unincorporated community in Kentucky, United States

- Unincorporated community
- Location within Kentucky Location within the United States
- Coordinates: 37°54′39″N 86°34′52″W
- Country: United States
- State: Kentucky
- County: Breckinridge
- Elevation: 427 ft (130 m)
- Time zone: UTC-6 (Central (CST))
  - Summer (DST): UTC-5 (CDT)
- Area code: 270
- GNIS feature ID: 512759

Holt is an unincorporated community in Breckinridge County, Kentucky, United States. Holt is located on the Ohio River and Kentucky Route 144, 6 miles (9.7 km) north-northeast of Cloverport. It was also known as Holt's Bottom.

== History ==
Holt was named after Joseph Holt, who was appointed Commissioner of Patents in 1857, Postmaster General in 1859, and Secretary of War in 1860 during the administration of President James Buchanan. He was appointed Judge Advocate General by President Abraham Lincoln and was the judge during the trial of conspirators in the Lincoln assassination. The Holt post office opened in 1880 and continued to operate until 1958. There was also a school near Holt called Holt School and a church known as Holt Chapel. Judge Holt's home, which is on the National Register of Historic Places, still stands and Judge Holt is buried in a private cemetery next to the home.

== Notable people ==
- Judge Joseph Holt (1807–1894), Commissioner of Patents (1857), Postmaster General (1859), Secretary of War (1860), and Judge Advocate General under President Lincoln.
