= Axtel, Kentucky =

Unincorporated community in Kentucky, United States

- Unincorporated community
- Location within the state of Kentucky Axtel (the United States)
- Coordinates: 37°38′39″N 87°43′24″W
- Country: United States
- State: Kentucky
- County: Breckinridge
- Elevation: 594 ft (181 m)
- Time zone: UTC-6 (Central (CST))
  - Summer (DST): UTC-5 (CDT)
- ZIP codes: 40103
- GNIS feature ID: 507431

Axtel is an unincorporated community within Breckinridge County, Kentucky, United States. St. Anthony's Catholic Church is located in Axtel.

== History ==
William L. 'Billy' Cannon, tanyard owner and pioneer, and Ferd McClellan wrote on the application for a post office, "We have rote to ax yo to tel us a name fo our post office," and the post master wrote "A-X-T-E-L" will be the name of your post office." According to local tradition that's how the name Axtel came to be. The post office was established in 1891 but closed on January 2, 1993. The name of the community may have been St. Anthony (after the church) before the post office opened. It may also have been known as Long Lick after the nearby creek.

The first Roman Catholic church was built in 1819 and named for St. Anthony the Abbott. There were several failed attempts at starting a school for the church, one around 1820 by the Sisters of Charity of Nazareth, another in 1823 by the Sisters of Loretto, and a third from 1830 to 1836 by the parish itself. A school was again built in the 1920s and staffed by the Ursulines. This school closed in 1971.

After the US Army Corps of Engineers completed work on the dam that formed Rough River Lake in 1961, a boat ramp and campground for the lake were built near the community.
