= Big Spring, Kentucky =

Unincorporated community in Kentucky, United States

- Unincorporated community
- Location within Kentucky Location within the United States
- Coordinates: 37°47′57″N 86°09′08″W
- Country: United States
- State: Kentucky
- Counties: Breckinridge, Hardin, Meade
- Elevation: 663 ft (202 m)
- Time zones: UTC-6 (Central (CST))
  - Summer (DST): UTC-5 (CDT)
- UTC-5 (Eastern (EST))
  - Summer (DST): UTC-4 (EDT)
- Area codes: 270 & 364
- GNIS feature ID: 512759

Big Spring, Kentucky is an unincorporated community in Breckinridge County (west part) in the Central Time Zone, as well as in Meade County (northeast part), and Hardin County (southeast part) in the Eastern Time Zone in the U.S. state of Kentucky.

Big Spring takes its name from a spring which emerges near the town site, then sinks underground. A post office was established for the community in 1826.

== Notable person ==
- Charles Harwood Moorman, United States federal judge
