= Grayson Springs, Kentucky =

Unincorporated community in Kentucky, United States

- Unincorporated community
- Location within Kentucky Location within the United States
- Coordinates: 37°27′33″N 86°13′28″W
- Country: United States
- State: Kentucky
- County: Grayson
- Elevation: 558 ft (170 m)
- Time zone: UTC-6 (Central (CST))
  - Summer (DST): UTC-5 (CDT)
- Area code: 270
- GNIS feature ID: 508123

Grayson Springs is an unincorporated community in Grayson County, Kentucky, United States. Grayson Springs is located at the junction of Kentucky Routes 88 and 1214, 4.1 miles (6.6 km) east-southeast of Leitchfield.

In the 19th century, Grayson Springs contained a destination spa on its mineral springs.
