= Breckinridge County, Kentucky =

County in Kentucky, United States

- County
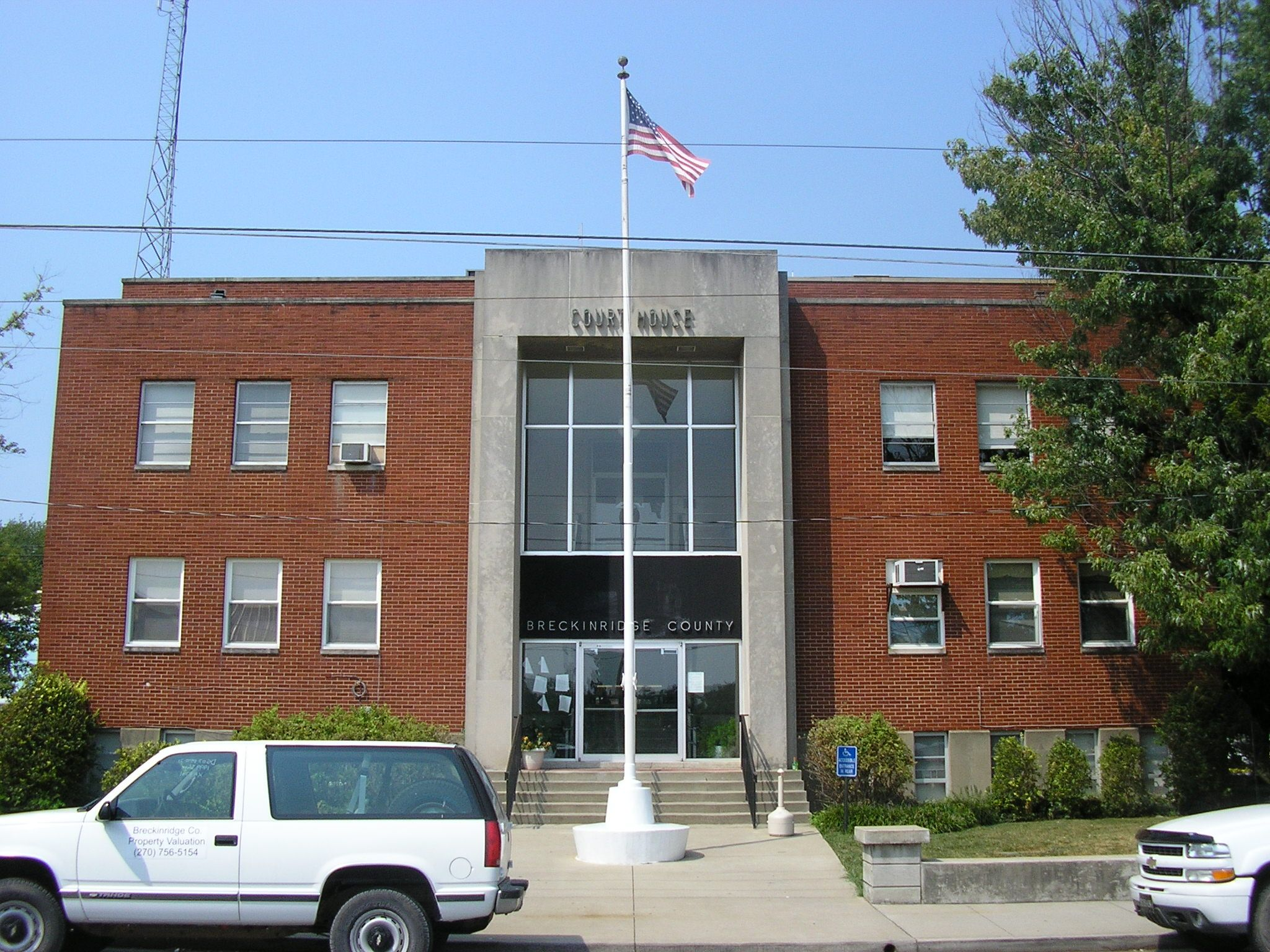
- Breckinridge County, Kentucky courthouse in Hardinsburg

- Flag Seal

- Location within the U.S. state of Kentucky
- Coordinates: 37°46′N 86°26′W
- Country: United States
- State: Kentucky
- Founded: 1799
- Named for: John Breckinridge
- Seat: Hardinsburg
- Largest city: Hardinsburg

Government
  - Judge/Executive: Maurice Lucas (R)

Area
  - Total: 586 sq mi (1,520 km^{2})
  - Land: 567 sq mi (1,470 km^{2})
  - Water: 18 sq mi (47 km^{2}) 3.2%

Population (2020)
  - Total: 20,432
  - Estimate (2025): 21,503 ▲
  - Density: 37.4/sq mi (14.4/km^{2})
- Time zone: UTC−6 (Central)
  - Summer (DST): UTC−5 (CDT)
- Congressional district: 2nd
- Website: breckinridgeky.com

Breckinridge County is a county located in the Commonwealth of Kentucky. As of the 2020 census, the population was 20,432. Its county seat is Hardinsburg, Kentucky. The county was named for John Breckinridge (1760–1806), a Kentucky Attorney General, state legislator, United States Senator, and United States Attorney General. It was the 38th Kentucky county in order of formation. Breckinridge County is now a wet county, following a local-option election on January 29, 2013, but it had been a dry county for the previous 105 years.

== History ==
The area presently bounded by Kentucky state lines was a part of the U.S. State of Virginia, known as Kentucky County when the British colonies separated themselves in the American Revolutionary War. In 1780, the Virginia legislature divided the previous Kentucky County into three smaller units: Fayette, Jefferson, and Lincoln. In 1791, this area was separated into the State of Kentucky; it became effective on June 1, 1792. From that time, the original three counties were divided several times. A portion of Jefferson County was split off as Nelson County in 1784; a portion of Nelson was split off as Hardin County in 1792; the present Breckinridge County was split off from Hardin in 1799.

In August 1779, Sinclair Hardin (first cousin of Captain William Hardin, the founder of Hardin's Fort), was killed by Shawnee Indians while taking a drink at Big Springs. He was the first white settler in Breckinridge County to be killed by Native Americans. The Indian threat continued for several years. However, the only sizable expedition against the Native Americans that Breckinridge County settlers took part in culminated in the Battle of Saline Creek in August 1786, in Illinois. The battle only lasted a few minutes, with fierce hand-to-hand combat. Between 18 and 30 Shawnee warriors were killed, with six more wounded. The remainder of the Shawnee fled. Captain William Hardin had commanded the Kentucky volunteers, many of whom also were killed or wounded. Hardin's militia brought home 16 Shawnee scalps, nine captured horses, 17 muskets, and "a mighty nice sword".

The bloodiest slave rebellion in Kentucky before the American Civil War took place in Breckinridge County on the Ohio River in September 1826. Enslaved people in transit to the Natchez slave market killed their captors and attempted to travel north to freedom, but were apprehended. Five of the leaders of the rebellion were executed by hanging, while the survivors were re-enslaved in Bourbon County, Kentucky and the Deep South.

The Judge-Executive of Breckinridge County from 1801 to 1805 was William Comstock. Jo Allen was the county clerk, and Ben Huff was the sheriff.

During the American Civil War, raiding Kentucky Confederate cavalry burned the courthouse, as it was being used by Union troops as a barracks, though most of the records were saved. On March 12, 1865, Jerome Clarke, a well known Confederate guerrilla, claimed by some to have been Sue Munday, was captured near the Breckinridge–Meade County line. He was hanged three days later in Louisville. Afterward, his trial drew heavy criticism.

During the nineteenth century, the Victoria Coal Mines, named in honor of British Queen Victoria, were the first to produce coal oil, and Cloverport exported it to Great Britain, where it was used to light Buckingham Palace.

United States Supreme Court Justice Wiley Blount Rutledge Jr., who served on the High Court from 1943 to 1949, was born at Tar Springs in 1894, when his father was pastor of Cloverport Baptist Church.

On June 6, 1932, at Hardinsburg, Sam Jennings became the penultimate person to be publicly executed in the United States.

In the 1950s, Rough River Dam State Resort Park was developed at the southern border of the county.

A third courthouse fire nearly destroyed county records in 1958.

Breckinridge County High School won the 1965 and 1995 Kentucky High School Athletic Association's Boys' Basketball tournaments.

The Breckinridge County Archives, formed in 1984, was the first state-funded archival repository in the history of the United States and is known across the nation as an excellent resource for genealogical and historical research.

== Geography ==
According to the United States Census Bureau, the county has a total area of 586 square miles (1,520 km^{2}), of which 567 square miles (1,470 km^{2}) is land and 18 square miles (47 km^{2}) (3.2%) is water.

=== Adjacent counties ===
- Perry County, Indiana (northwest)
- Meade County (northeast/EST Border)
- Hardin County (east/EST Border)
- Grayson County (south)
- Ohio County (southwest)
- Hancock County (west)

== Demographics ==
Historical population
Census	Pop.	Note	%±
1810	3,430		—
1820	7,485		118.2%
1830	7,345		−1.9%
1840	8,944		21.8%
1850	10,593		18.4%
1860	13,236		25.0%
1870	13,440		1.5%
1880	17,486		30.1%
1890	21,034		20.3%
1900	20,534		−2.4%
1910	21,034		2.4%
1920	19,652		−6.6%
1930	17,368		−11.6%
1940	17,744		2.2%
1950	15,528		−12.5%
1960	14,734		−5.1%
1970	14,789		0.4%
1980	16,861		14.0%
1990	16,312		−3.3%
2000	18,648		14.3%
2010	20,059		7.6%
2020	20,432		1.9%
2025 (est.)	21,503	▲	5.2%
U.S. Decennial Census; 1790-1960 1900-1990; 1990-2000 2010-2020 2024

=== 2020 census ===
As of the 2020 census, the county had a population of 20,432. The median age was 42.7 years. 23.1% of residents were under the age of 18 and 19.6% of residents were 65 years of age or older. For every 100 females there were 102.4 males, and for every 100 females age 18 and over there were 100.3 males age 18 and over.

The racial makeup of the county was 92.2% White, 2.1% Black or African American, 0.2% American Indian and Alaska Native, 0.2% Asian, 0.0% Native Hawaiian and Pacific Islander, 0.6% from some other race, and 4.7% from two or more races. Hispanic or Latino residents of any race comprised 1.4% of the population.

0.0% of residents lived in urban areas, while 100.0% lived in rural areas.

There were 8,003 households in the county, of which 29.5% had children under the age of 18 living with them and 23.4% had a female householder with no spouse or partner present. About 26.8% of all households were made up of individuals and 13.1% had someone living alone who was 65 years of age or older.

There were 10,704 housing units, of which 25.2% were vacant. Among occupied housing units, 77.3% were owner-occupied and 22.7% were renter-occupied. The homeowner vacancy rate was 1.8% and the rental vacancy rate was 7.3%.

=== 2000 census ===
As of the census of 2000, there were 18,648 people, 7,324 households, and 5,309 families residing in the county. The population density was 33 per square mile (13/km^{2}). There were 9,890 housing units at an average density of 17 per square mile (6.6/km^{2}). The racial makeup of the county was 95.84% White, 2.86% Black or African American, 0.23% Native American, 0.08% Asian, 0.02% Pacific Islander, 0.09% from other races, and 0.90% from two or more races. 0.72% of the population were Hispanic or Latino of any race.

There were 7,324 households, out of which 31.00% had children under the age of 18 living with them, 59.60% were married couples living together, 8.90% had a female householder with no husband present, and 27.50% were non-families. 24.60% of all households were made up of individuals, and 11.60% had someone living alone who was 65 years of age or older. The average household size was 2.51 and the average family size was 2.97.

In the county, the population was spread out, with 24.90% under the age of 18, 8.20% from 18 to 24, 26.70% from 25 to 44, 26.00% from 45 to 64, and 14.20% who were 65 years of age or older. The median age was 38 years. For every 100 females there were 98.60 males. For every 100 females age 18 and over, there were 96.30 males.

The median income for a household in the county was $30,554, and the median income for a family was $36,575. Males had a median income of $31,004 versus $19,371 for females. The per capita income for the county was $15,402. About 11.80% of families and 15.80% of the population were below the poverty line, including 16.60% of those under age 18 and 19.00% of those age 65 or over.

== Education ==
=== K-12 education ===
School districts include:

- Breckinridge County School District
- Cloverport Independent School District

It also has a private school:

- Saint Romuald Interparochial School

=== Library ===
Breckinridge County Public Library is located at 308 Old Highway 60 in Hardinsburg, Kentucky.

=== Higher education ===
A Roman Catholic seminary school operated in the Mount Merino community from 1838 to 1843. Founded by brothers Drs. Benedict and Richard Wathen, Mount Merino Seminary would today be considered a high school. It closed when its director, Fr. B.J. Spalding, was transferred.

A Methodist college operated in the Kingswood community from 1906 to 1934. Founded by John Wesley Hughes, Kingswood College closed during the Great Depression.

== Communities ==
=== Cities ===
- Cloverport
- Hardinsburg (county seat)
- Irvington

=== Unincorporated Communities A–L ===
- Addison
- Axtel
- Bewleyville
- Big Spring (partially in Hardin County and Meade County in the Eastern Time Zone)
- Cannons Point
- Clifton Mills
- Constantine
- Custer
- Dyer
- Fairfield
- Falls of Rough (mostly in Grayson County)
- Fisher
- Frymire
- Garfield
- Glen Dean
- Harned
- Hinton Hills
- Holt
- Hudson
- Kingswood
- Kirk
- Locust Hill
- Lodiburg

=== Unincorporated Communities M–Z ===
- Madrid
- Mattingly
- McCoy
- McDaniels
- McQuady
- Mook
- Mooleyville
- Mount Merino
- Mystic
- Raymond
- Roff
- Sample
- Se Ree
- Stephensport
- Tar Fork
- Union Star
- Vanzant
- Webster
- Westview

== Notable natives ==
Name	Achievements
Alfred "Butch" Beard	professional basketball player and coach
David "Big Dave" DeJernett	professional basketball player
Philip Leget Edwards	American educator
Joseph Holt	Judge Advocate General of the United States Army
Joseph Holt	Attorney General
Joseph Holt	Secretary of War
Joseph Holt	Commissioner of Patents
Joseph Holt	Postmaster General
Bobbi Jordan	American actress
John Alexander McClernand	Union General during the American Civil War
Charles Harwood Moorman	Judge of the Kentucky Court of Appeals
Charles Harwood Moorman	Judge of the United States District Court for the Western District of Kentucky
Charles Harwood Moorman	Judge of the United States Court of Appeals for the Sixth Circuit
Wiley Blount Rutledge	Justice of the Supreme Court of the United States
George W. Swink	businessman
Joe Wright	Majority floor leader in the Kentucky State Senate

== Politics ==
United States presidential election results for Breckinridge County, Kentucky
Year	Republican		Democratic		Third party(ies)	
Year	No.	%	No.	%	No.	%
1912	1,163	25.91%	1,967	43.82%	1,359	30.27%
1916	2,549	53.23%	2,172	45.35%	68	1.42%
1920	4,368	53.93%	3,702	45.71%	29	0.36%
1924	3,832	53.37%	3,230	44.99%	118	1.64%
1928	4,783	61.53%	2,987	38.43%	3	0.04%
1932	3,237	45.69%	3,814	53.83%	34	0.48%
1936	2,898	46.55%	3,233	51.94%	94	1.51%
1940	3,258	49.43%	3,296	50.01%	37	0.56%
1944	3,292	52.94%	2,889	46.46%	37	0.60%
1948	2,407	46.38%	2,623	50.54%	160	3.08%
1952	3,078	51.98%	2,828	47.75%	16	0.27%
1956	3,784	56.72%	2,867	42.98%	20	0.30%
1960	3,979	55.92%	3,136	44.08%	0	0.00%
1964	2,167	36.66%	3,733	63.15%	11	0.19%
1968	2,779	47.32%	2,024	34.46%	1,070	18.22%
1972	3,574	64.25%	1,921	34.53%	68	1.22%
1976	2,698	44.15%	3,347	54.77%	66	1.08%
1980	3,629	52.66%	3,163	45.90%	99	1.44%
1984	4,432	62.14%	2,669	37.42%	31	0.43%
1988	3,841	57.99%	2,765	41.75%	17	0.26%
1992	2,941	41.94%	3,113	44.39%	959	13.67%
1996	3,151	46.36%	2,956	43.49%	690	10.15%
2000	4,763	63.91%	2,595	34.82%	95	1.27%
2004	5,580	65.49%	2,884	33.85%	56	0.66%
2008	5,281	61.97%	3,110	36.49%	131	1.54%
2012	5,025	63.06%	2,825	35.45%	119	1.49%
2016	6,484	73.90%	1,960	22.34%	330	3.76%
2020	7,701	75.49%	2,350	23.04%	150	1.47%
2024	7,882	78.44%	2,038	20.28%	128	1.27%

=== Elected officials ===
Elected officials as of January 3, 2025
U.S. House	Brett Guthrie (R)	KY 2
Ky. Senate	Stephen Meredith (R)	5
Ky. House	Josh Calloway (R)	10

== See also ==
- National Register of Historic Places listings in Breckinridge County, Kentucky
