= Falls of Rough, Kentucky =

Unincorporated community in Kentucky, United States

Falls of Rough
- Unincorporated community
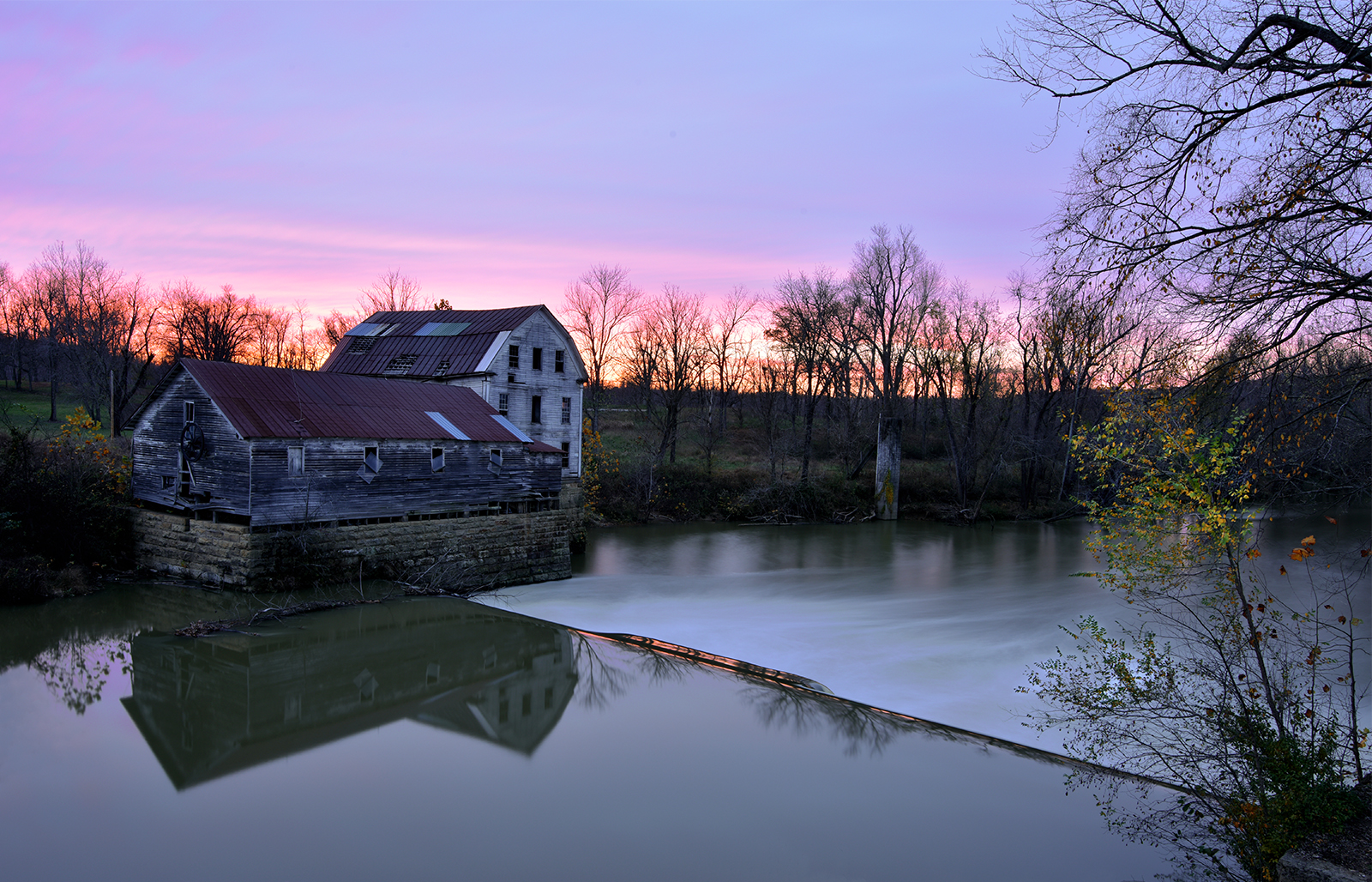
- Grist mill, now abandoned and partially destroyed, Grayson County, KY

- Location within the state of Kentucky Falls of Rough (the United States)
- Coordinates: 37°35′24″N 86°32′56″W
- Country: United States
- State: Kentucky
- County: Breckinridge
- Elevation: 486 ft (148 m)
- Time zone: UTC-6 (Central (CST))
  - Summer (DST): UTC-5 (CDT)
- ZIP codes: 40119
- GNIS feature ID: 507976

Falls of Rough is an unincorporated community mostly located in Grayson County, and a smaller part in Breckinridge County, Kentucky, United States.

== History ==
Falls of Rough lies on the boundary between Breckinridge and Grayson Counties. Many Native relics have been found here from several different tribes. In 1792 George Washington owned 5,000 acres in the area. In 1790, the power of the falls were harnessed with the building of a new mill. The first settler there was George Wilson from North Carolina who built the first dam in the area. Some years after purchasing several thousand acres at the falls, Benjamin Sebastian, one of the first Kentucky Appellate Court judges, sold it all to Willis Green. In 1823 Willis Green built the house and store that still stand today.

When the Falls of Rough post office originally opened in 1830 it bore Green's name. It was later renamed in 1850 for a nearby rapid on the Rough River.

In 1855, the rock dam built by Willis Green washed out. Lafe Green borrowed $20,000 from B.F. Beard to rebuild it. The stonework in the new dam was done by Edgar Bennett and has thus far stood the trials of time. After years of operation the saw mill ran out of quality trees in the area and shut down in 1933. Between 1915 and 1920 the Greens owned over 8,000 acres of land making it the largest single farming operation in the state at the time. A flour mill also operated here. They processed 6,250 barrels of flour a day. The best grade was called "Grayson Lily," the next "White Rose," and the third "Good Enough."

== Climate ==
The climate in this area is characterized by hot, humid summers and generally mild to cool winters. According to the Köppen Climate Classification system, Falls of Rough has a humid subtropical climate, abbreviated "Cfa" on climate maps.
