= Cloverport, Kentucky =

Cloverport
- City
- Motto: "Our Home on the Ohio"
- Location of Cloverport in Breckinridge County, Kentucky.
- Coordinates: 37°50′3″N 86°37′55″W
- Country: United States
- State: Kentucky
- County: Breckinridge

Area
  - Total: 1.52 sq mi (3.94 km^{2})
  - Land: 1.46 sq mi (3.78 km^{2})
  - Water: 0.062 sq mi (0.16 km^{2})
- Elevation: 489 ft (149 m)

Population (2020)
  - Total: 1,119
  - Density: 765.9/sq mi (295.73/km^{2})
- Time zone: UTC-6 (Central (CST))
  - Summer (DST): UTC-5 (CDT)
- ZIP code: 40111
- Area codes: 270 & 364
- FIPS code: 21-15904
- GNIS feature ID: 0489709
- Website: www.cloverport.com

Cloverport is a home rule-class city in Breckinridge County, Kentucky, United States, on the banks of the Ohio River. As of the 2020 census, Cloverport had a population of 1,119.

== History ==
The town was once known as Joesville after its founder, Joe Huston. Established around 1798 (or possibly 1808) on the east side of where Clover Creek meets the Ohio River. The town was the site of the ferry where, in 1816, Jacob Weatherholt piloted the family of Abraham Lincoln, then seven, across the Ohio River on its way to a newly acquired farm in Spencer County, Indiana.

Around 1820 a building was constructed that became the town's first school and was shared by the Baptist and Methodist congregations as a church on Sundays. The town's first graveyard, known as the Scott Cemetery, was beside this building which was located south of present Murray Avenue and east of Cherry Street.

The town was renamed Cloverport in 1828 after nearby Clover Creek. Seven years before, in 1821, the Kentucky Legislature had built a toll road between the town and Bowling Green. 1828 also saw the town open a post office with George LaHeist as post master.

In 1829, the Baptist congregation built their own church. In 1831, a new graveyard, known as the Murray Graveyard, was established on the north side of Main Street near the Cherry Street intersection. The Methodist congregation built their own church in 1840 on east Huston Street. The old building then became a church for the town's black residents. The Methodist moved again in 1871 to a site on Elm Street.

The town was the site of a button factory, which made use of mussel shells from the Ohio. In the nineteenth century, the Victoria Coal Mines (named in honor of the British queen) produced coal oil from cannel coal that was used to light Buckingham Palace.

In 1857, the first Roman Catholic church, St. Malachi, was built on Chestnut Street south of Huston Street. In 1887, a new church was built and named St. Rose of Lima across the railroad tracks from the old St. Malachi church. The church and rectory were both burned in 1894 and rebuilt at their present locations.

The town was formally incorporated by an act of the state assembly in 1860 and expanded to take in the growing number of homes on the west side of Clover Creek. Land was also donated that year for a Presbyterian church at the corner of Main Street and Lynn Street. A church was never built there but in 1889 the property was exchanged for land on east Main Street where a church was built.

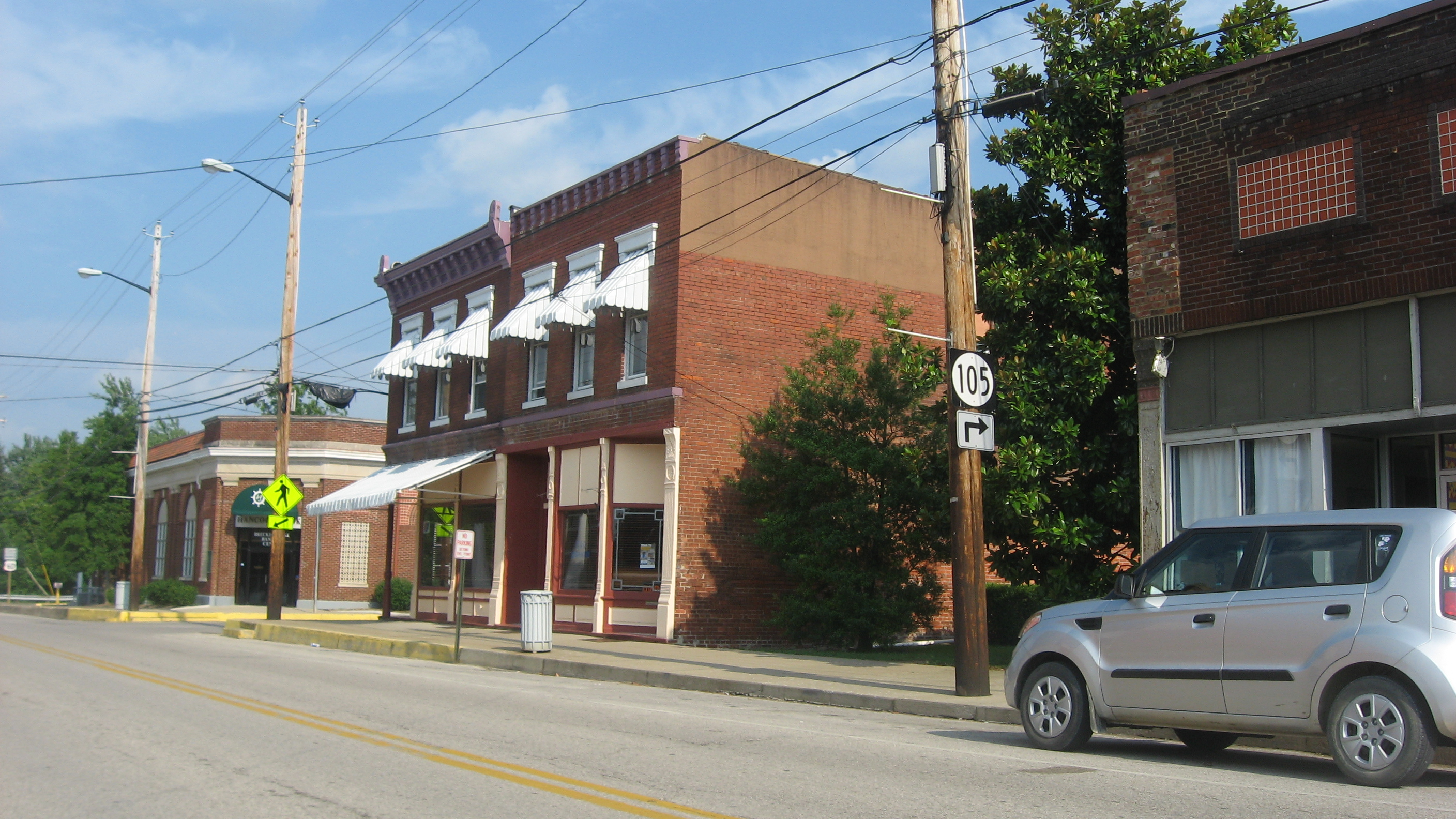
Cloverport Historic District

The town had its own newspaper beginning on July 17, 1878. The Breckenridge News was started by John D. Babbage and run by his family until 1950 when it was sold to George and Edith Wilson. The Wilsons merged the paper with their other newspaper, the Irvington Herald, and formed the Breckinridge County Herald-News in 1956.

In 1892 Cloverport became the home of the maintenance shops for the Louisville, Henderson, and St. Louis Railroad. The town raised $20,000 to bring the shops and donated ten acres for the location. The shops employed two hundred men at one time. The shop burned down on March 13, 1916, but was rebuilt. The shops stayed open until 1929 when the Louisville, Henderson and St. Louis was bought out by the Louisville and Nashville Railroad. The city and railroad company went to federal court in Louisville with the city trying to force the shops to stay open or for the railroad to pay the city back the original $20,000 that was raised for the shops plus $30,000 in interest. The dispute was settled out of court with the railroad paying back the original $20,000 plus returning the ten acres of land to the city. The city turned the land into an athletic park and a waste treatment facility.

Former United States Supreme Court Justice Wiley Blount Rutledge was born at nearby Tar Springs on July 20, 1894. Rutledge was the son of the pastor of Cloverport's Baptist church.

On March 13, 1901, a fire swept through the city leaving about half of the residents homeless and destroying almost all of the business buildings, including two full American Tobacco Company warehouses. The Lucille Memorial Presbyterian Church, whose congregation had just paid off the mortgage, was burned down as was the Methodist church. Damage was estimated to be over $500,000 in the city.

In 1903, The Murray Roofing Tile Company started a tile plant in the city. In 1959 the company merged with other companies to form the Ceramic Tile Division of National Gypsum. This division then became known as American Olean Tile Company.

Another fire struck Cloverport on March 14, 1910, and destroyed many homes on the east side of town. At the time, the closest fire truck was in Owensboro and men from the Louisville, Henderson, and St. Louis Railroad repair yard were credited with saving many homes.

The Methodist church on Elm Street burned down in 1943. Two years later the congregation moved into a renovated building at the intersection of Main Street and Elm Street and was named Grant Memorial Church for their minister, Rev. W. A. Grant. In 1971, Grant Memorial's congregation merged with Lucille Memorial Presbyterian church and the Evangelical United Brethren Church to form Cloverport United Methodist Church. This combined congregation purchased land for their new building in 1972 at their current site on south Elm Street.

Every August the town sponsors a festival named for Sacajawea who is purported to have stopped in the town during her journeys.

In 2003, the National Park Service transferred the Cloverport Access Site to the city so that a community riverfront park could be developed. The property included the boat ramp on Clover Creek and 15.7 acres of property.

=== Flooding ===
Being a river town, Cloverport has been subjected to several floods since its founding. The Ohio River Flood of 1884 had been what all other floods which have struck the city were compared to until 1937. A flood in January 1907 crested at two feet below the 1884 high water mark. The city was also struck by the Great Flood of 1913. The Phelps' Button factory flooded leaving many out of work and many other families were forced to leave their homes. It was reported that the flood waters were seven feet over the Tar Fork bridge and neck deep on a horse at Hites Run. All of the homes across the river in Tobinsport, Indiana were under water. The Ohio River flood of 1937 saw seventy percent of the town's residents hit by the flood waters. The crest of the flood at the downstream Cannelton Locks and Dam was measured at 60.8 feet. This is over six feet higher than the next highest flood, which was the 1945 flood that crested at 54.4 feet. Cloverport was also hit by large floods in 1997, 2011, and 2018.

== Historic sites ==
- Cloverport Historic District, comprises most of the old downtown business district
- Oglesby-Conrad House, on U.S. 60
- Fisher Homestead on U.S. 60
- Skillman House on Tile Plant Road

== Geography ==
According to the U.S. Census Bureau, the city has a total area of 1.5 square miles (4.0 km^{2}), of which 1.5 square miles (3.8 km^{2}) is land and 0.04 square miles (0.1 km^{2}), or 3.74%, is water.

== Demographics ==
Historical population
Census	Pop.	Note	%±
1830	194		—
1860	920		—
1870	840		−8.7%
1880	1,056		25.7%
1890	1,527		44.6%
1900	1,656		8.4%
1910	1,403		−15.3%
1920	1,509		7.6%
1930	1,324		−12.3%
1940	1,402		5.9%
1950	1,357		−3.2%
1960	1,334		−1.7%
1970	1,388		4.0%
1980	1,585		14.2%
1990	1,207		−23.8%
2000	1,256		4.1%
2010	1,152		−8.3%
2020	1,119		−2.9%
U.S. Decennial Census

As of the census of 2000, there were 1,256 people, 536 households, and 351 families residing in the city. The population density was 779.1 inhabitants per square mile (300.8/km^{2}). There were 620 housing units at an average density of 384.6 per square mile (148.5/km^{2}). The racial makeup of the city was 96.42% White, 2.47% African American, 0.08% Asian, 0.08% from other races, and 0.96% from two or more races. Hispanic or Latino of any race were 0.88% of the population.

There were 536 households, out of which 23.9% had children under the age of 18 living with them, 47.6% were married couples living together, 14.0% had a female householder with no husband present, and 34.5% were non-families. 32.3% of all households were made up of individuals, and 16.8% had someone living alone who was 65 years of age or older. The average household size was 2.27 and the average family size was 2.83.

In the city, the population was spread out, with 20.8% under the age of 18, 8.9% from 18 to 24, 23.6% from 25 to 44, 27.4% from 45 to 64, and 19.3% who were 65 years of age or older. The median age was 43 years. For every 100 females, there were 95.9 males. For every 100 females age 18 and over, there were 89.5 males.

The median income for a household in the city was $23,750, and the median income for a family was $30,917. Males had a median income of $30,156 versus $18,750 for females. The per capita income for the city was $14,990. About 14.1% of families and 20.2% of the population were below the poverty line, including 27.9% of those under age 18 and 13.3% of those age 65 or over.

== Education ==
Students in Cloverport attend Cloverport Independent Schools.

Cloverport High---1930 Class A 2nd-Region Boys Champs and 1932 6th-Region Boys Champs.

Cloverport has a public library, a branch of the Breckinridge County Public Library.

In 1871 and 1872 there was a school in town for black students supported by the Freedmen's Aid Society.

Beginning in 1900, St. Rose of Lima Catholic Church operated a parochial school in the city. The original school only lasted a couple of months but it was re-opened in 1916 with teaching duties being taken over my the Ursuline Sisters of Mount Saint Joseph. A high school and an elementary school were operated by the church until the early 1950s when the high school was closed. The elementary school was closed in the late 1960s.

== Notable people ==
- Joseph Seamon Cotter Sr., poet, writer, playwright, and community leader
- Dora Dean, vaudeville dancer
- James W. Flanagan, Lieutenant Governor of Texas
- Webster Flanagan, member of the Texas State Senate
- Rice E. Graves, Confederate artillery officer
- Virginia Cary Hudson, New York Times best selling author
- Joseph Holt, Commissioner of Patents, Postmaster General and Secretary of War in President Buchanan's administration, 1857-1861
- Benjamin Franklin Mudge, first State Geologist of Kansas
- Eli Houston Murray, Governor of the Utah Territory
- Wiley Blount Rutledge, former United States Supreme Court jurist

== See also ==
- List of cities in Kentucky
- List of cities and towns along the Ohio River
