= Irvington, Kentucky =

- City
- Flag Seal

- Location of Irvington in Breckinridge County, Kentucky.
- Coordinates: 37°52′44″N 86°17′5″W
- Country: United States
- State: Kentucky
- County: Breckinridge
- Incorporated: 1889
- Named after: the hometown of a railroad engineer

Government
  - Mayor: Yvonne Kennedy

Area
  - Total: 0.88 sq mi (2.27 km^{2})
  - Land: 0.88 sq mi (2.27 km^{2})
  - Water: 0 sq mi (0.00 km^{2})
- Elevation: 620 ft (189 m)

Population (2020)
  - Total: 1,231
  - Density: 1,402.6/sq mi (541.54/km^{2})
- Time zone: UTC-6 (Central (CST))
  - Summer (DST): UTC-5 (CDT)
- ZIP code: 40146
- Area codes: 270 & 364
- FIPS code: 21-39664
- GNIS feature ID: 0495028
- Website: irvington.ky.gov

Irvington is a home rule-class city in Breckinridge County, Kentucky, in the United States. As of the 2020 census, Irvington had a population of 1,231.

== Geography ==
Irvington is located at 37°52′44″N 86°17′5″W (37.878966, -86.284637).

According to the United States Census Bureau, the city has a total area of 0.89 square miles (2.3 km^{2}), all land.

== History ==
The local post office was first established as Merino (for the nearby Mt. Merino Seminary) on February 16, 1885. However, two area businessmen, R.M. Jolly and Edgar L. Bennett, anticipating the route of the Louisville, St. Louis, and Texas Railroad, purchased 315 acres (127 ha) of farmland at the site and then, with the help of the railroad's employees, platted a new community over the 1888–89 winter. This was named for Irvington, New York, the hometown of the railroad's chief engineer, Eugene Cornwall. Irvington was formally incorporated by the state assembly in 1889.

In 1933, Holy Guardian Angel Roman Catholic church was moved from nearby Mount Merino to High Street. The move was made when the church at Mount Merino needed too many repairs and it was decided to move closer to the population center.

== Demographics ==
Historical population
Census	Pop.	Note	%±
1900	385		—
1910	665		72.7%
1920	655		−1.5%
1930	764		16.6%
1940	790		3.4%
1950	831		5.2%
1960	1,190		43.2%
1970	1,300		9.2%
1980	1,409		8.4%
1990	1,180		−16.3%
2000	1,257		6.5%
2010	1,181		−6.0%
2020	1,231		4.2%
U.S. Decennial Census

As of the census of 2000, there were 1,257 people, 512 households, and 345 families residing in the city. The population density was 1,166.0 inhabitants per square mile (450.2/km^{2}). There were 545 housing units at an average density of 505.5 per square mile (195.2/km^{2}). The racial makeup of the city was 83.93% White, 14.40% African American, 0.40% Native American, 0.32% Asian, 0.08% Pacific Islander, 0.08% from other races, and 0.80% from two or more races. Hispanic or Latino of any race were 1.03% of the population.

There were 512 households, out of which 33.8% had children under the age of 18 living with them, 44.7% were married couples living together, 18.6% had a female householder with no husband present, and 32.6% were non-families. 29.5% of all households were made up of individuals, and 15.2% had someone living alone who was 65 years of age or older. The average household size was 2.46 and the average family size was 3.01.

In the city, the population was spread out, with 29.2% under the age of 18, 7.6% from 18 to 24, 25.9% from 25 to 44, 20.5% from 45 to 64, and 16.7% who were 65 years of age or older. The median age was 36 years. For every 100 females, there were 84.3 males. For every 100 females age 18 and over, there were 82.0 males.

The median income for a household in the city was $27,105, and the median income for a family was $32,500. Males had a median income of $29,375 versus $23,214 for females. The per capita income for the city was $15,269. About 18.1% of families and 21.3% of the population were below the poverty line, including 34.8% of those under age 18 and 6.7% of those age 65 or over.

== Climate ==
The climate in this area is characterized by hot, humid summers and generally mild to cool winters. According to the Köppen Climate Classification system, Irvington has a humid subtropical climate, abbreviated "Cfa" on climate maps.

== In popular culture ==
Irvington along with the neighboring towns of Brandenburg and Ekron, are featured in the open world survival horror game Project Zomboid as of the release of Build 42 of the game. Other Kentucky towns such as West Point, Muldraugh, and Louisville have previously served as core locations throughout the game.

== Education ==
Irvington has a public library which is a branch of the Breckinridge County Public Library.
