= Hardinsburg, Kentucky =

- City
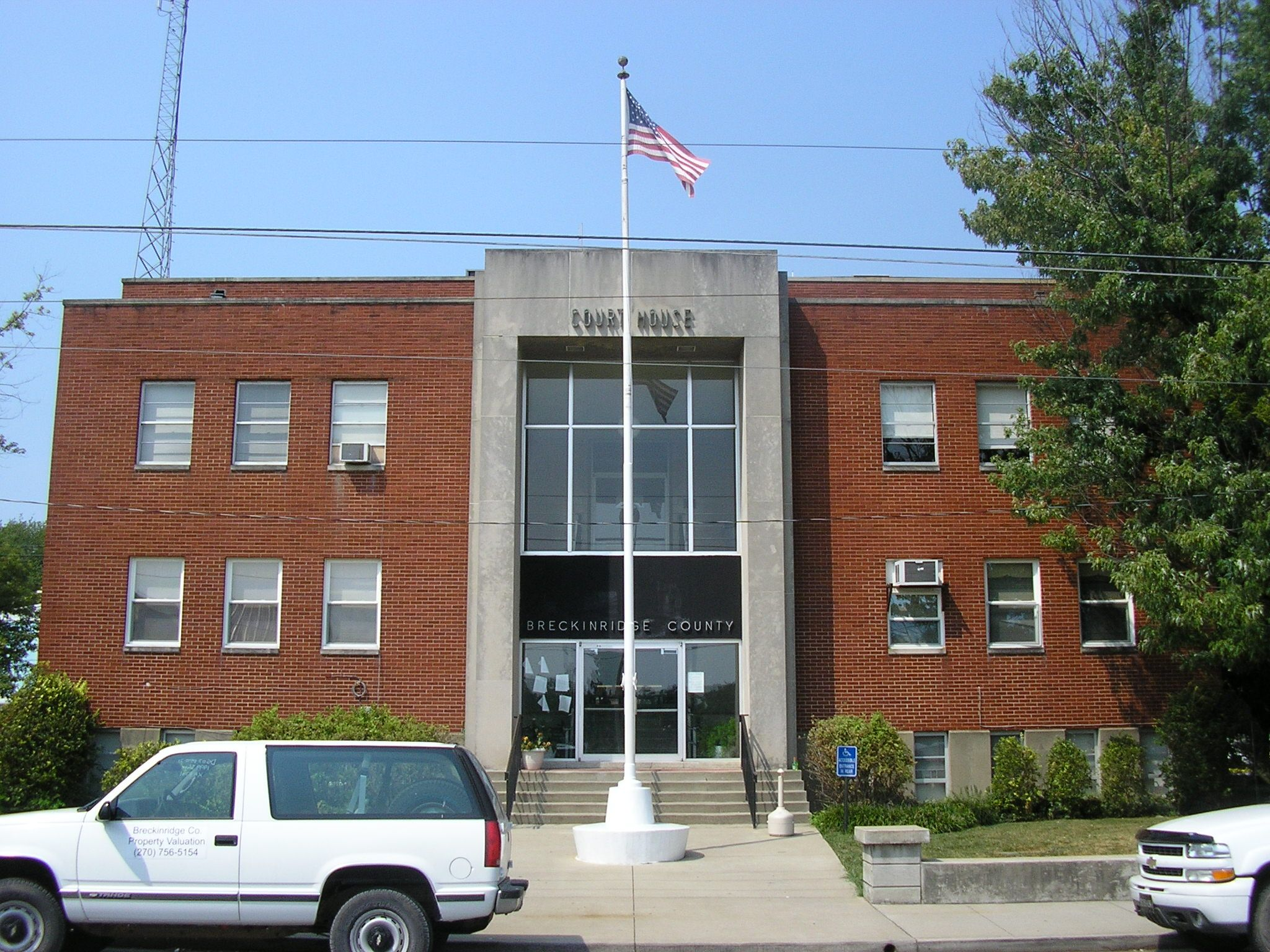
- Breckinridge County courthouse in Hardinsburg

- Location of Hardinsburg in Breckinridge County, Kentucky.
- Coordinates: 37°46′35″N 86°27′18″W
- Country: United States
- State: Kentucky
- County: Breckinridge
- Founded: 1780
- Incorporated: 1890
- Named for: William Hardin

Government
  - Mayor: Wayne Macy

Area
  - Total: 3.54 sq mi (9.17 km^{2})
  - Land: 3.46 sq mi (8.96 km^{2})
  - Water: 0.081 sq mi (0.21 km^{2})
- Elevation: 709 ft (216 m)

Population (2020)
  - Total: 2,385
  - Estimate (2022): 2,433
  - Density: 689.7/sq mi (266.29/km^{2})
- Time zone: UTC-6 (CST)
  - Summer (DST): UTC-5 (CDT)
- ZIP Code: 40143
- Area codes: 270 & 364
- FIPS code: 21-34552
- GNIS feature ID: 0493730
- Website: hardinsburgky.com

Hardinsburg is a home rule-class city in Breckinridge County, Kentucky, in the United States. It is the seat of its county. As of the 2020 census, Hardinsburg had a population of 2,385. Hardinsburg was named after Captain William Hardin.

== History ==
In August 1779, Sinclair Hardin, William's cousin, was the first man killed (by the Shawnee) west of the Alleghenies Mountains at Big Springs during an early excursion into the Kentucky wilderness.

Capt. William Hardin, brother of the Col. John Hardin for whom Hardin County was named, established a frontier fort at the site in 1780. The settlement was known variously as Hardin's Fort and Hardin's Station in the 18th century.

William Hardin received 400 acres as assignee of Benjamin Hardin, Warrant# 2586, dated February 14, 1780, and the tract was surveyed June 8, 1784. According to the description, the land was on Hardin's Creek, a branch of the Ohio River, and it was formally granted on June 21, 1786. This area would become Hardinsburg.

Hardinsburg was laid out in 1782 by William Hardin. It is small and its growth has been slow, having failed to number a thousand inhabitants in its first hundred years. Among its early and prominent citizens were Joseph Allen, Captain Thomas Kincheloe, Reverend James Taylor, Philip Lightfoot, Morris Hensly, Charles Hambleton, William Feaman, B and RM Wathen, John McClarty, William Morton, Stanley Singleton, James and Williamson Cox, William Seaton, Francis Peyton, Joseph Thomas, Thornton Smith, Jefferson Jennings and Dr. S.B. Abel. When Judge Kincheloe, Colonel Alf. Allen, Mr. Vivian Daniel, Rev. RG Gardner and Squire Eskridge die, the "old guard" will have become extinct.

William Hardin received grants from the state of Virginia in 1785 for 3800 acres of land, all near the present site of Hardinsburg, Kentucky.

The murder and scalping of young James Jolly was the second colonizer to be murdered by native Kentuckians at Hardin's Fort. James was the son of Nelson Jolly Jr., the progenitor of the Jolly family of present-day Breckinridge County. At seventeen years of age, and newly arrived at the fort, James went alone to bring in the horses which were grazing along Clover Creek, a few hundred yards from its palisaded walls. When he did not return, a scouting party eventually found his mutilated body. James Jolly was the first person to die at Hardin's Station and the first to be buried under a hickory tree near the banks of Clover Creek, where, both his father and William Hardin were buried when they died.

Hardinsburg was established in 1800 as the seat of government for the newly established Breckinridge County. The first courthouse was a log house built in 1801. Jack Hardin's family book states family members laid out the town without compass or chain in the Fall of 1781; their only instruments were a vine and ax. Its post office was established on January 1, 1803, as Breckinridge Court House or Hardinburg.

In 1810, a Roman Catholic church was founded. Originally named St. Rumoldus (St. Rumbold) after the Cathedral in Mechelen, Belgium, the name was later changed to St. Romuald. From 1924 to 1982 the church was served by priests from the Missionaries of the Precious Blood.

A Methodist congregation was formed in 1828.

In 1887, a group met at the courthouse and started the Baptist church for the town.

The city was formally incorporated by the state assembly on May 3, 1890.

== Geography ==
Hardinsburg is located at 37°46′35″N 86°27′18″W (37.776336, −86.455010).

According to the United States Census Bureau, the city has a total area of 3.6 square miles (9.2 km^{2}), of which 3.4 square miles (8.9 km^{2}) is land and 0.04 square miles (0.1 km^{2}), or 2.34%, is water.

== Demographics ==
Historical population
Census	Pop.	Note	%±
1830	316		—
1840	634		100.6%
1860	380		—
1870	455		19.7%
1880	585		28.6%
1890	681		16.4%
1900	689		1.2%
1910	737		7.0%
1920	810		9.9%
1930	805		−0.6%
1940	930		15.5%
1950	902		−3.0%
1960	1,377		52.7%
1970	1,547		12.3%
1980	2,211		42.9%
1990	1,906		−13.8%
2000	2,345		23.0%
2010	2,343		−0.1%
2020	2,385		1.8%
2022 (est.)	2,433		2.0%
U.S. Decennial Census

=== 2020 census ===
As of the 2020 census, Hardinsburg had a population of 2,385. The median age was 43.3 years. 20.2% of residents were under the age of 18 and 25.3% of residents were 65 years of age or older. For every 100 females there were 86.6 males, and for every 100 females age 18 and over there were 83.1 males age 18 and over.

0.0% of residents lived in urban areas, while 100.0% lived in rural areas.

There were 976 households in Hardinsburg, of which 28.7% had children under the age of 18 living in them. Of all households, 42.1% were married-couple households, 16.5% were households with a male householder and no spouse or partner present, and 34.6% were households with a female householder and no spouse or partner present. About 33.0% of all households were made up of individuals and 18.0% had someone living alone who was 65 years of age or older.

There were 1,101 housing units, of which 11.4% were vacant. The homeowner vacancy rate was 2.4% and the rental vacancy rate was 6.5%.

Racial composition as of the 2020 census
Race	Number	Percent
White	2,110	88.5%
Black or African American	116	4.9%
American Indian and Alaska Native	4	0.2%
Asian	14	0.6%
Native Hawaiian and Other Pacific Islander	0	0.0%
Some other race	12	0.5%
Two or more races	129	5.4%
Hispanic or Latino (of any race)	29	1.2%

=== 2010 census ===
As of the census of 2010, there were 2,343 people, 964 households, and 583 families residing in the city. The population density was 651.4 inhabitants per square mile (251.5/km^{2}). There were 1,078 housing units at an average density of 302.5 per square mile (116.8/km^{2}). The racial makeup of the city was 90.06% White, 8.61% African American, 0.17% Native American, 0.09% Asian, 0.13% from other races, and 0.94% from two or more races. Hispanics or Latinos of any race were 1.41% of the population.

There were 964 households, out of which 25.1% had children under the age of 18 living with them, 43.8% were married couples living together, 13.4% had a female householder with no husband present, and 39.5% were non-families. 36.8% of all households were made up of individuals, and 19.1% had someone living alone who was 65 years of age or older. The average household size was 2.19 and the average family size was 2.83.

The age distribution was 20.3% under the age of 18, 10.3% from 18 to 24, 25.4% from 25 to 44, 23.6% from 45 to 64, and 20.4% who were 65 years of age or older. The median age was 40 years. For every 100 females, there were 86.6 males. For every 100 females age 18 and over, there were 85.0 males.

The median income for a household in the city was $26,447, and the median income for a family was $36,214. Males had a median income of $29,375 versus $20,331 for females. The per capita income for the city was $18,307. About 14.6% of families and 19.3% of the population were below the poverty line, including 21.5% of those under age 18 and 18.9% of those age 65 or over.

== Education ==
Hardinsburg has a public library, a branch of the Breckinridge County Public Library.

Hardinsburg public school students are served by the Breckinridge County School District.

In 1871 and 1872 there was a school in town for black students supported by the Freedmen's Aid Society.

A Catholic school has been located in Hardinsburg since 1876. The school was originally staffed by the Sisters of Charity of Nazareth, the Sisters of Loretto, then by the Ursulines after 1887. Members of the Benedictine Sisters served the school beginning in 1990. In 1991, St. Romuald High School was closed.

== Notable people ==
- Butch Beard, former NBA All-Star
- Percy Beard, silver medalist hurdler in National Track and Field Hall of Fame
- Ralph Beard, member of "Fabulous Five" University of Kentucky men's basketball team
- Jenks "Tex" Carman, guitarist
- Donnie Gedling, former member of the Kentucky House of Representatives
- Bobbi Jordan, actress raised in Hardinsburg
- Lisa Thornhill, actress born and raised in Hardinsburg.
