= National Register of Historic Places listings in Hancock County, Kentucky =

Location of Hancock County in Kentucky

This is a list of the National Register of Historic Places listings in Hancock County, Kentucky.

This is intended to be a complete list of the properties and districts on the National Register of Historic Places in Hancock County, Kentucky, United States. The locations of National Register properties and districts for which the latitude and longitude coordinates are included below, may be seen in a map.

There are 12 properties and districts listed on the National Register in the county.

This National Park Service list is complete through NPS recent listings posted December 12, 2025.

== Current listings ==
	Name on the Register	Image	Date listed	Location	City or town	Description
1	Robert C. Beauchamp House	Robert C. Beauchamp House	July 6, 1976 (#76000894)	Northwest of Hawesville on U.S. Route 60; 37°55′28″N 86°48′22″W	Hawesville	
2	Hancock County Courthouse	Hancock County Courthouse	June 18, 1975 (#75000765)	Courthouse Sq. 37°54′03″N 86°44′58″W	Hawesville	
3	Hawesville Historic District	Hawesville Historic District	April 12, 1984 (#84001536)	Main, River, Main Cross, and Clay Sts. 37°54′05″N 86°44′58″W	Hawesville	
4	Isaac R. Hayden House	Isaac R. Hayden House	August 1, 1984 (#84001539)	Pell St. 37°56′08″N 86°54′19″W	Lewisport	
5	Tom Henderson House	Tom Henderson House	August 1, 1984 (#84001540)	4th St. 37°56′08″N 86°54′06″W	Lewisport	
6	Immaculate Conception Church	Immaculate Conception Church	June 18, 1975 (#75000766)	River St. 37°54′21″N 86°45′13″W	Hawesville	Destroyed
7	Jeffry Cliff Petroglyphs (15HA114)		September 8, 1989 (#89001191)	Address Restricted	Indian Lake	
8	Lewisport Masonic Lodge	Lewisport Masonic Lodge	August 1, 1984 (#84001541)	4th St. 37°56′11″N 86°54′07″W	Lewisport	
9	Samuel Pate House		December 21, 1978 (#78001335)	East of Lewisport off Kentucky Route 334; 37°58′17″N 86°51′24″W	Lewisport	
10	Horace Patterson House	Horace Patterson House	August 1, 1984 (#84001543)	Market St. 37°56′15″N 86°54′13″W	Lewisport	
11	Joe Pell Building	Joe Pell Building	August 1, 1984 (#84001544)	Pell St. 37°56′13″N 86°54′11″W	Lewisport	Small wood frame commercial building, rare as an intact example from the 19th century. Building no longer exists at the site.
12	J.B. Taylor and Son Feed Store	J.B. Taylor and Son Feed Store	August 1, 1984 (#84001546)	307 4th St. 37°56′12″N 86°54′07″W	Lewisport	

== See also ==
- List of National Historic Landmarks in Kentucky
- National Register of Historic Places listings in Kentucky
