= Hancock County Courthouse =

Hancock County Courthouse may refer to:

- Hancock County Courthouse (Georgia), Sparta, Georgia
- Hancock County Courthouse (Indiana), Greenfield, Indiana, site of some public art in Indiana
- Hancock County Courthouse (Iowa), Garner, Iowa
- Hancock County Courthouse (Kentucky), Hawesville, Kentucky
- Hancock County Courthouse (Mississippi), Bay St. Louis, Mississippi a Mississippi Landmark
- First Hancock County Courthouse, Findlay, Ohio
- Hancock County Courthouse (Ohio), Findlay, Ohio
