= National Register of Historic Places listings in Hancock County, Ohio =

Location of Hancock County in Ohio

This is a list of the National Register of Historic Places listings in Hancock County, Ohio.

This is intended to be a complete list of the properties and districts on the National Register of Historic Places in Hancock County, Ohio, United States. The locations of National Register properties and districts for which the latitude and longitude coordinates are included below, may be seen in an online map.

There are 14 properties and districts listed on the National Register in the county.

This National Park Service list is complete through NPS recent listings posted March 14, 2025.

== Current listings ==
| | Name on the Register | Image | Date listed | Location | City or town | Description |
|---|---|---|---|---|---|---|
| 1 | Adams School | Adams School | August 11, 2004 (#04000832) | 826 Washington St. 41°02′32″N 83°39′45″W | Findlay | Former school, current residential building |
| 2 | Charles H. Bigelow House | Charles H. Bigelow House | March 29, 2006 (#06000200) | 2816 N. Main St. 41°04′24″N 83°39′00″W | Findlay | Private residence |
| 3 | The Boss Manufacturing Company | The Boss Manufacturing Company | September 6, 2018 (#100002879) | 317 W. Main Cross St. 41°02′21″N 83°39′17″W | Findlay | Commercial building |
| 4 | Marcus Dana House | Marcus Dana House | March 24, 1980 (#80003095) | 707 N. County Line St. 41°09′57″N 83°25′17″W | Fostoria | Residence |
| 5 | Findlay Country Club Golf Course | Findlay Country Club Golf Course | December 2, 2019 (#100004705) | 1500 Country Club Dr. 41°02′48″N 83°37′22″W | Findlay | Country club and golf course. |
| 6 | Findlay Downtown Historic District | Findlay Downtown Historic District | February 28, 1985 (#85000402) | Roughly along Main, W. Sandusky, and W. Main Cross Sts. 41°02′13″N 83°39′01″W | Findlay | Historic downtown core of Findlay. |
| 7 | First Hancock County Courthouse | First Hancock County Courthouse | March 13, 1976 (#76001454) | 819 Park St. 41°01′56″N 83°38′37″W | Findlay | The first courthouse of Hancock County. |
| 8 | Fostoria Mausoleum | Fostoria Mausoleum | August 25, 1978 (#78002085) | 702 Van Buren St. 41°09′51″N 83°25′39″W | Fostoria | Mausoleum in Fostoria. |
| 9 | Hancock County Courthouse | Hancock County Courthouse | May 7, 1973 (#73001475) | Courthouse Sq. 41°02′20″N 83°39′02″W | Findlay | Current courthouse of Hancock County, Ohio. |
| 10 | Jasper G. Hull House | Jasper G. Hull House | May 7, 1973 (#73001476) | 422 W. Sandusky St. 41°02′14″N 83°39′21″W | Findlay | Residence |
| 11 | Elijah Pelton Jones House | Elijah Pelton Jones House | March 14, 1985 (#85000563) | 313 E. Sandusky St. 41°02′12″N 83°38′45″W | Findlay | Residence |
| 12 | Dr. Albert Linaweaver House | Dr. Albert Linaweaver House | September 29, 1983 (#83001988) | 1224 S. Main St. 41°01′33″N 83°39′02″W | Findlay | Residence |
| 13 | Marion Township School District No. 3 | Marion Township School District No. 3 | August 8, 1996 (#96000883) | 8884 County Road 236; 41°02′17″N 83°35′35″W | Marion Township | Preserved One-room school |
| 14 | Andrew Powell Homestead | Andrew Powell Homestead | December 19, 1986 (#86003449) | 9821 County Road 313; 41°00′24″N 83°41′32″W | Liberty Township | Residence |

== See also ==
- List of National Historic Landmarks in Ohio
- Listings in neighboring counties: Allen, Hardin, Henry, Putnam, Seneca, Wood, Wyandot
- National Register of Historic Places listings in Ohio
