= De Jalma West =

De Jalma West (May 19, 1876 – November 15, 1958) was an American actor and a federal immigrant inspector.

== Early life ==
De Jalma West was born in Roseville, Kentucky on May 19, 1876, the son of Joseph Thomas and Elizabeth West. West grew up in Kentucky and came to New York after he reached adulthood.

== Career ==
West worked as an immigrant inspector at Ellis Island from about 1905 to 1915. He developed an acting career at some point, but it is uncertain when he started. He acted in silent films including The Secret Kingdom (Vitagraph, 1916), The Boy Who Cried Wolf (1916), and The Trail of the Shadow (Metro, 1917). In 1918, he worked at the New York City office of U.S. Military Intelligence. Later in his life, West retired to Florida. He died on November 15, 1958, at the age of eighty-two. He was interred at Arlington National Cemetery on November 21.

== Filmography ==
The Secret Kingdom (Vitagraph, 1916; director: Theodore Marston) - as Count Ramon; The Boy Who Cried Wolf (1917); The Trail of the Shadow (Metro, 1917) - as Sergeant Keen
