= Aluminum industry in the United States =

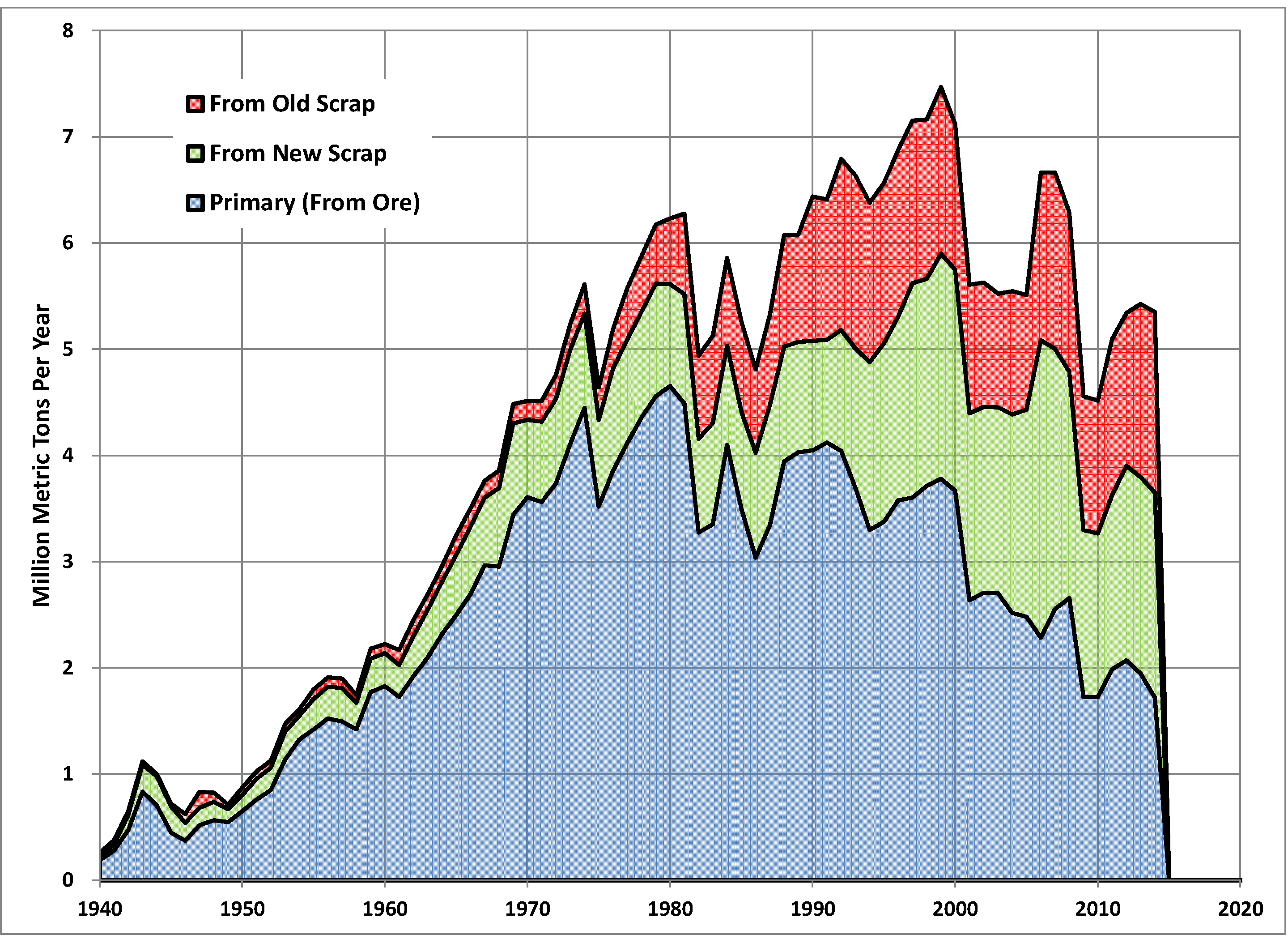
US production of aluminum, 1940–2014. Data from USGS

The aluminum industry in the United States in 2023 produced 860 thousand metric tonnes of aluminum from refined metal ore (primary production), at six smelters. In addition, US industry recycled 3.4 million tonnes of aluminum (so-called secondary production aluminum). Total annual imports of metal and alloy for use in secondary production stood at 2.6 million metric tonnes in the year to August 2023, with the previous decade seeing a fundamental shift toward recycled production.

== Primary production ==
In 2014, primary aluminum, which is produced from bauxite, was produced by three companies at nine smelters. Primary aluminum is preferred for high-quality uses such as aircraft. The leader in US production was Alcoa. Also operating multiple primary plants was Century Aluminum.

Primary production volume in 1999 was 3.8 million metric tonnes and by 2023 it dropped to an annual volume of 785,000 metric tonnes. By March 2024, there were four operating plants with a combined yearly capacity of 650,000 metric tonnes. In 1980, there were approximately 30 smelters in operation in the US. The US had a global market share of under 2% of primary aluminum production in 2022.

Primary Aluminum Smelters in the US

Name	Location	Owner	Status and Date
Warrick Plant	Evansville, Indiana	Alcoa	Operating, July 2022
Massena Plant	Massena, New York	Alcoa	Operating, April 2014
Mt Holly Plant	Mount Holly, South Carolina	Century Aluminum	Operating, December 2014
Sebree Plant	Sebree, Kentucky	Century Aluminum	Operating, May 2015
Noranda Plant	New Madrid, Missouri	Magnitude 7 Metals	Idled, January 2024
Hawesville Plant	Hawesville, Kentucky	Century Aluminum	Idled, June 2022
Intalco Plant	Ferndale, Washington	Alcoa	Closed, March 2023
Ravenswood Plant	Ravenswood, West Virginia	Century Aluminum	Closed, July 2015
Ormet Plant	Hannibal, Ohio	Ormet	Closed, August 2014
Columbia Falls Plant	Columbia Falls, Montana	Glencore	Closed in March 2015
St. Lawrence Plant	Massena, New York	Alcoa	Closed
Wenatchee Plant	Wenatchee, Washington	Alcoa	Closed
Rockdale Plant	Rockdale, Texas	Alcoa	Closed

== Secondary production ==
Secondary production is the recycling of metallic aluminum derived from scrap. Secondary production can be from either new scrap (from aluminum manufacturing), or from old scrap (post-consumer scrap such as recycled aluminum cans).

By 2021, secondary production accounted for 78% of US aluminum production.

== Raw materials ==
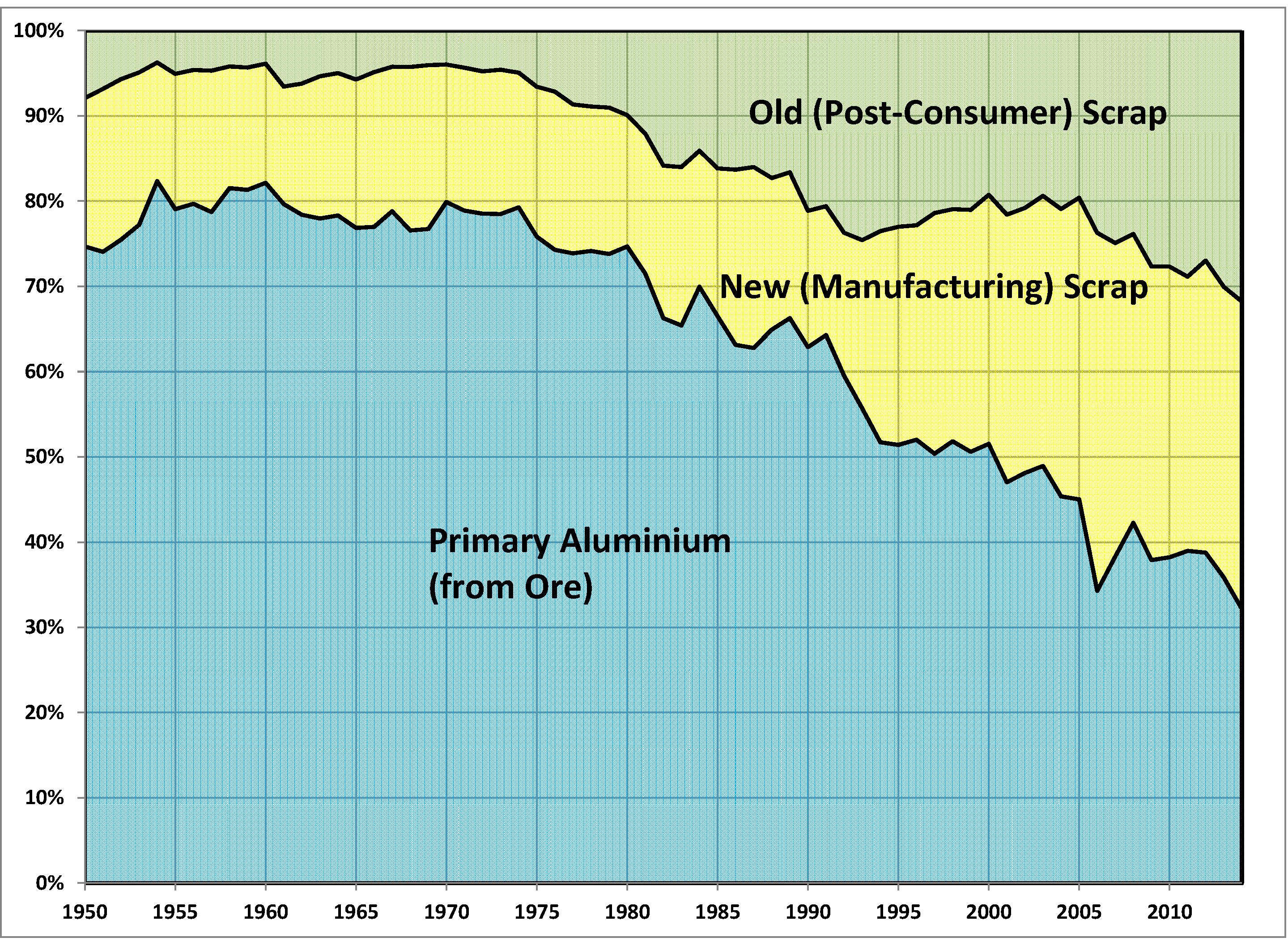
Proportion of US aluminum production from various raw materials. Data from USGS.

The principal raw materials for aluminum production are bauxite (for primary production) and scrap (for secondary production).

Primary aluminum production consumes a great deal of electricity, which makes up about a third of the cost. Making a ton of primary aluminum consumes at least 12,500 kWh, and most plants consume 14,500 to 15,000 kWh per ton of primary aluminum.

Secondary production of a given unit of aluminum requires about 10% of the electricity of primary production.

The United States mined production of bauxite for primary aluminum production is insignificant. In 2013, the US mined only 1.3 percent of the bauxite it used, US mined production being less than 0.1 percent of world production.

== International trade ==
The US imported nearly all the bauxite (the only commercial aluminum ore) used in producing primary aluminum. For years, the US has produced less than 1% of the bauxite used to make aluminum.

The US also imported 33 percent of the aluminum that was used in 2014. Of the imported aluminum, 63% came from Canada.

2015 Imports for consumption by country
No.	Country	Quantity		Value	
No.	Country	metric tonnes	%	k$	%
1	Canada	2,820,000	55.5	6,130,000	50.2
2	China	395,000	7.8	1,120,000	9.2
3	Russia	297,000	5.8	683,000	5.6
4	United Arab Emirates	294,000	5.8	665,000	5.5
5	Mexico	162,000	3.2	383,000	3.1
6	Bahrain	109,000	2.1	269,000	2.2
7	Argentina	85,900	1.7	187,000	1.5
8	Germany	78,200	1.5	324,000	2.7
9	Venezuela	68,900	1.4	128,000	1.0
10	South Africa	57,300	1.1	179,000	1.5
11	South Korea	38,400	0.8	109,000	0.9
12	Japan	27,800	0.5	122,000	1.0
13	Brazil	27,000	0.5	56,900	0.5
14	France	21,500	0.4	155,000	1.3
15	Australia	19,800	0.4	47,700	0.4
16	Italy	19,300	0.4	70,400	0.6
17	United Kingdom	17,100	0.3	59,300	0.5
18	Norway	14,000	0.3	32,100	0.3
19	Spain	9,360	0.2	21,400	0.2
20	Belgium	8,810	0.2	43,800	0.4
21	Panama	5,010	0.1	7,070	0.1
22	Netherlands	4,980	0.1	21,900	0.2
Other		496,000	9.8	1,390,000	11.4
Total		5,080,000	100.0	12,200,000	100.0

2015 Exports by country
No.	Country	Quantity		Value	
No.	Country	metric tonnes	%	k$	%
1	China	882,000	29.3	1,570,000	18.6
2	Mexico	821,000	27.3	2,530,000	29.9
3	Canada	657,000	21.8	2,050,000	24.3
4	Korea, Republic of	205,000	6.8	532,000	6.3
5	Taiwan	46,700	1.6	106,000	1.3
6	Japan	38,200	1.3	275,000	3.3
7	Hong Kong	32,100	1.1	52,400	0.6
8	France	22,200	0.7	161,000	1.9
9	Germany	20,700	0.7	134,000	1.6
10	United Kingdom	19,200	0.6	164,000	1.9
11	Brazil	9,030	0.3	55,400	0.7
12	Thailand	8,090	0.3	32,900	0.4
13	Saudi Arabia	6,070	0.2	27,800	0.3
14	Singapore	5,010	0.2	41,200	0.5
15	Italy	3,080	0.1	39,800	0.5
16	Netherlands	2,290	0.1	12,200	0.1
17	Venezuela	1,240	0.0	11,200	0.1
18	Philippines	613	0.0	5,660	0.1
19	Russia	359	0.0	1,480	0.0
20	South Africa	202	0.0	2,010	0.0
21	Kazakhstan	65	0.0	463	0.0
22	Ukraine	4	0.0	36	0.0
Other		231,000	7.7	641,000	7.6
Total		3,010,000	100.0	8,450,000	100.0

== History of US aluminum production ==
The US used to be a much more important factor in the world primary aluminum market. As recently as 1981, the US produced 30% of the world's primary aluminum, and for many years up through 2000, the US was the world's largest producer of primary aluminum. In 2014, by contrast, the US ranked sixth in primary aluminum production, and provided only 3.5% of world production.

US production of primary aluminum peaked in 1980 at 4.64 million metric tonnes. Since then, US primary aluminum production has fallen by more than half, but secondary production has increased, making up much of the difference. In the 1950s and 1960s, primary production made up about 80% of the aluminum output. In 2014, primary production made up 32%, while secondary from new scrap made up 36% and secondary from old scrap made up 32% of US aluminum production.

=== Climate impact and market competitiveness ===
The development of tools which calculate up-front carbon emissions is expected to bring changes to the relative competitiveness of US-produced aluminum products, and result in states with relative lower emissions gaining a competitive advantage both for sourcing aluminum construction materials and for siting of new aluminum industry facilities.

== See also ==
- The Aluminum Association
