= Hancock County High School =

Coordinates: 36.5433°N 83.1983°W

Location
- 80 State Route 271 South; Lewisport, Kentucky; United States

Information
- School type: Public high school
- Motto: High Expectations—Success for All!
- Opened: 1914
- School district: Hancock County
- NCES District ID: 2102460
- NCES School ID: 210246000507
- Principal: Ginger Estes
- Teaching staff: 31.00 (FTE)
- Grades: 9–12
- Enrollment: 463 (2023-2024)
- Student to teacher ratio: 14.94
- Colors: Red and gray
- Athletics conference: Kentucky High School Athletic Association
- Nickname: Hornets
- Accreditation: Southern Association of Colleges and Schools Council on Accreditation and School Improvement of the AdvancED Accreditation Commission
- Website: hchs.hancock.kyschools.us

Hancock County High School (HCHS) is a public school located in Lewisport, Kentucky, for grades 9 through 12, recognized by the Kentucky Department of Education for having best practices.

== History ==
The first Hancock County High School was established in Hawesville, Kentucky, in 1914. Housed in an antebellum mansion purchased by the Board of Education, it was described as "a handsome and commodious dwelling, planned for hospitality."

Later, the school was split into Lewisport and Hawesville High Schools, but in 1957 the school board purchased 46 acres of land in Lewisport, and in 1961 the schools were consolidated to the new location known as the Patch by the Pike. The school was again named "Hancock County High School".

In 1973, a new $18 million, 89,000 square foot, single-story brick school building was constructed. Classrooms were designed in a "semi-open space area", shaped like honey comb, with a large central media-library. The site also featured a new football field and a new gymnasium that could be partitioned for handball courts and wrestling areas. It was designed for 500 students, and the 1961 high school building was converted for Hancock Middle School use.

In 2014, the county prioritized major renovations at HCHS, including the construction of 15 new classrooms, at a cost of $7.3 million. In 2016, a group of HCHS students led a drive to raise taxes to pay for replacing the Hancock Middle School facility.

For the school year 2020-2021 HCHS enrolled 501 students.

In 2021 vice principal Ginger Estes replaced Ashley Gorman as principal.

The HCHS "Hornets" mascot displays school colors of red and gray.

== Curriculum ==
In 2021 HCHS was recognized by the Kentucky Department of Education for its implementation of lesson plan playlists, considered best curriculum practices involving a sequence of resources or activities for students to complete.

The school also placed first in their region in the 2021 Kentucky Summative Assessment, the state of Kentucky's collective ranking of students' academic performance. HCHS students' combined scores ranked first out of the twelve schools in the district in categories of high school math and high school science.

In 2018, the school introduced the Cadet Core, a program founded by a military veteran to teach military and leadership skills. Since 2018 the school has also offered a career preparation course, "Survey of Industry Careers", to "help students understand business and industry opportunities close to home", according to Bobbie Hayse of the Messenger-Inquirer. Subjects of the curriculum include, "human resources, accounting, production, supervision, maintenance, engineering and information technology".

== Activities ==
In 1999, HCHS played in the Kentucky Class A football championship game, and quarterback Travis Atwell was named Kentucky's Mr. Football.

Hancock County High School won the girls class A cross country state championship in 2001 and 2002.

The Hancock County High School Band competed in the 2019 Kentucky Music Educators Association State Marching Band Championships held at Western Kentucky University, winning the Class A state championship for the first time in the school's history, and making them the second school in the state to have won their class in their first state finals appearance.
