= Robert C. Beauchamp House =

Historic house in Kentucky, United States

- U.S. National Register of Historic Places
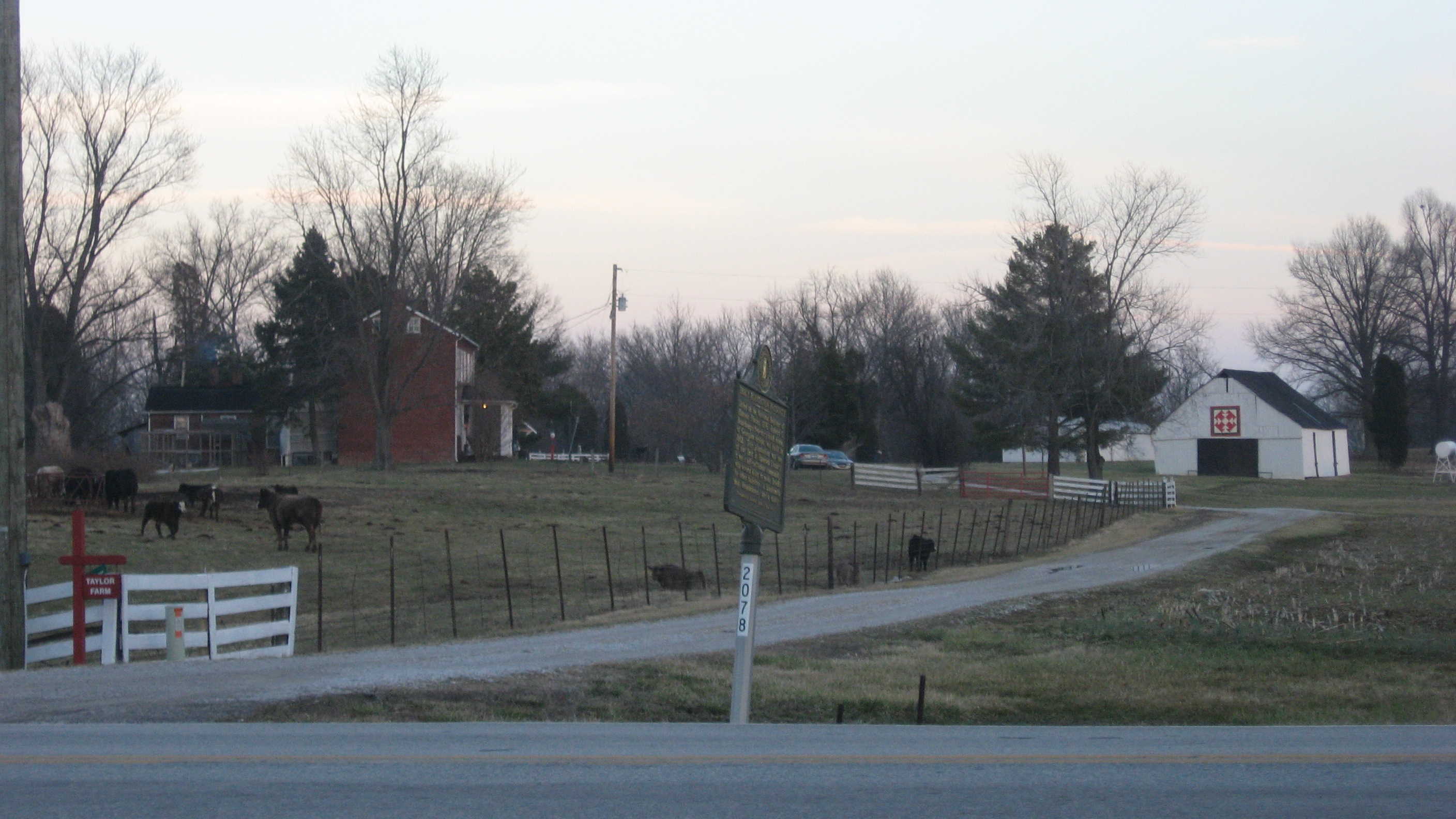

- Location within Kentucky Location within the United States
- Nearest city: Hawesville, Kentucky
- Coordinates: 37°55′28″N 86°48′22″W
- Area: 5 acres (2.0 ha)
- Built: 1842
- Built by: Beauchamp, Robert Costain
- Architectural style: Georgian
- NRHP reference No.: 76000894
- Added to NRHP: July 6, 1976

The Robert C. Beauchamp House is a historic house in Hancock County, Kentucky, located 3 miles (4.8 km) west or northwest of Hawesville on U.S. Route 60.

Its significance:

The house was built in 1842 by Robert Costain Beauchamp (1800-1884), a highly successful gentleman farmer and businessman. He was one of the first men to introduce the plantation system with a large work force of slaves, to Western Kentucky. He was also active in state and local politics. The amply-proportioned brick house is one of the oldest in Hancock County, Kentucky.

It was listed on the National Register of Historic Places in 1976.
