= Lewisport =

Lewisport may refer to:

- Lewisport, Kentucky
- Lewisporte, Newfoundland and Labrador
- Lewisport, Virginia, early name of what is now West Union, West Virginia
