= Adair, Kentucky =

Unincorporated community in Kentucky, United States

- Unincorporated community
- Location within Kentucky Location within the United States
- Coordinates: 37°57′2.2″N 86°49′35.96″W
- Country: United States
- State: Kentucky
- County: Hancock
- Elevation: 410 ft (120 m)
- Time zone: UTC-6 (Central (CST))
  - Summer (DST): UTC-5 (CDT)
- Area codes: 270 & 364
- GNIS feature ID: 507373

Adair is an unincorporated community in Hancock County, Kentucky United States. The community is centered around Kentucky Route 1605. It is in the northern section of the county.

Adair had a post office established on May 7, 1890. It was closed on May 15, 1956. By 1892, the community had a station with passenger service on the Louisville, Henderson and St. Louis Railway. The Louisville and Nashville Railroad bought the Louisville, Henderson and St. Louis Railway in 1929 and ended passenger service in November, 1958.
