= Reynolds Station, Kentucky =

Unincorporated community in Kentucky, United States

- Unincorporated community
- Location within Kentucky Location within the United States
- Coordinates: 37°39′17″N 86°48′15″W
- Country: United States
- State: Kentucky
- County: Ohio, Hancock
- Elevation: 453 ft (138 m)
- Time zone: UTC-6 (Central (CST))
  - Summer (DST): UTC-5 (CDT)
- ZIP code: 42368
- Area codes: 270 & 364
- GNIS feature ID: 501749

Reynolds Station is an unincorporated community in Ohio County, Kentucky, and Hancock County, Kentucky United States, with the majority of which being situated within Ohio County. The community is located on Kentucky Route 69 5 miles (8.0 km) northwest of Fordsville. Reynolds Station has a post office with ZIP code 42368, which opened on April 22, 1890.
