= Joe Pell Building =

- Pell, Joe, Building
- U.S. National Register of Historic Places
- Location: Pell St., Lewisport, Kentucky
- Coordinates: 37°56′13″N 86°54′11″W
- Area: less than one acre
- MPS: Lewisport MRA
- NRHP reference No.: 84001544
- Added to NRHP: August 1, 1984

The Joe Pell Building, also known as The Hub, on Pell St. in Lewisport, Kentucky, was listed on the National Register of Historic Places in 1984.

It was deemed significant as "the only intact late 19th century wood frame commercial building in Lewisport, and one of few which exist, intact in the state. It is a fine representative example of a once popular vernacular commercial building."

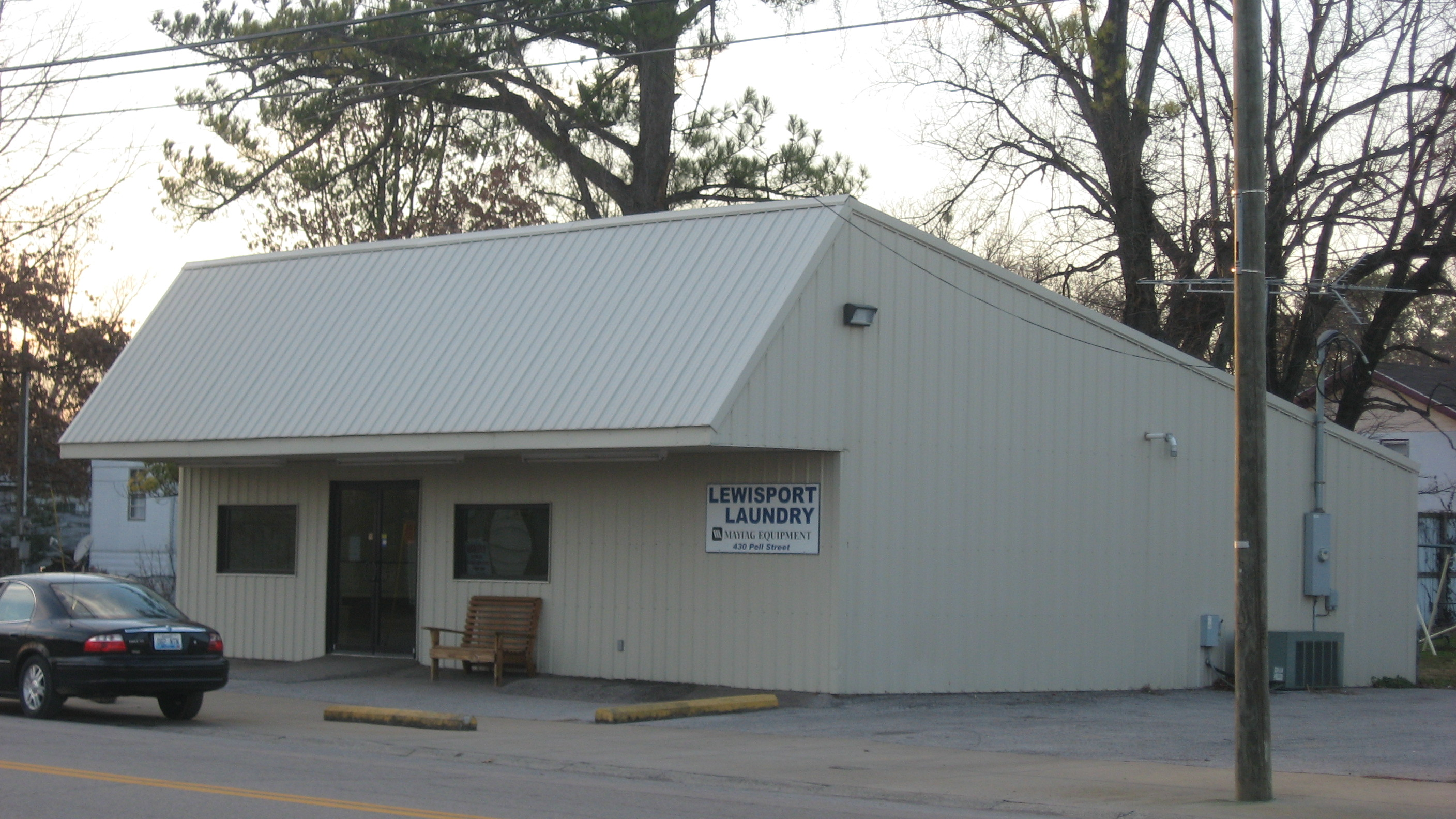
Modern building now on the site

The building is no longer on the site.
