= Century Aluminum =

American aluminum manufacturer

Century Aluminum Company
- Type: Public
- Traded as: Nasdaq: CENX; S&P 600 component
- Founded: 1995; 31 years ago
- Revenue: ▲US$2.53 billion (2025)
- Net income: ▼US$41.8 million (2025)

Century Aluminum Company is a US-based producer of primary aluminum, with aluminum plants in Kentucky, South Carolina, and Iceland. It is the largest producer of primary aluminum in the United States. The company is a publicly held corporation listed on the NASDAQ. The headquarters is at One South Wacker in Chicago.

== History ==
Since it was formed in 1995, Century has significantly expanded its operations through acquisitions and capital expansion projects and today operates primary aluminum smelters in Kentucky, South Carolina, and Iceland. Century became publicly listed on NASDAQ in 1996.

== Operations ==
The company operates three aluminum smelters in the US, and one in Iceland. Construction of a fifth smelter in Iceland has been halted since 2009. All Century's operations produce primary aluminum, that is, aluminum from ore, rather than from aluminum scrap. In 2014, the company produced 881,000 metric tons of aluminum.

- Hawesville, Kentucky (37.945°N 86.788°W)
- Mount Holly, South Carolina (33.051°N 80.055°W)
- Robards, Kentucky (Sebree) (37.658°N 87.501°W)
- Grundartangi, Hvalfjarðarsveit, Iceland
- Helguvik, Reykjanesbær, Iceland (construction halted)

As of late 2015, Century was suffering from low aluminum prices, and threatened to close its South Carolina plant, and lay off 600 workers, if it did not obtain less expensive electricity. Century made an agreement with Santee Cooper Power in December 2015, under which it would run the Mount Holly smelter at half capacity.

In 2015, Century announced the permanent closure of its Ravenswood, West Virginia plant, which had formerly employed 650 workers, citing high energy costs and economic headwinds. Similarly, in July 2022, Century idled its Hawesville, Kentucky, plant, citing "soaring energy prices." Before its curtailment, the company billed its Hawesville smelter as the "largest producer of high purity primary aluminum in North America," employing hundreds of workers. The smelter was still idled as of late 2024.

== See also ==
- Aluminium industry in the United States
