= The Trail of the Shadow =

1917 US silent film directed by Edwin Carewe

- Directed by: Edwin Carewe
- Written by: Albert Shelby Le Vino (scenario)
- Story by: Louis Wolheim
- Produced by: B. A. Rolfe
- Starring: Emmy Wehlen; William B. Davidson; Nancy Nash
- Cinematography: Arthur Martinelli
- Production companies: Metro Pictures; Rolfe Photoplays
- Distributed by: Metro Pictures
- Release date: June 18, 1917
- Running time: 5 reels
- Country: United States
- Language: Silent..English

The Trail of the Shadow is a 1917 American silent drama film. Directed by Edwin Carewe, the film stars Emmy Wehlen, William B. Davidson, and Harry S. Northrup. It was released on June 18, 1917.

== Cast ==
- Emmy Wehlen as Miriam Monroe
- William B. Davidson as John Conrad
- Harry S. Northrup as Albert Bernard
- Frank Currier as Randolph Monroe
- Fuller Mellish as Padre Constantine
- William Black as Bradford Duncan
- Cecil Owen as Eric Johansen
- Fred C. Truesdell as Prof. Poole
- Redfield Clark as Major General Foster
- Rudolph de Cordova as Williams
- W. M. Armstrong as Capt. Herbert
- De Jalma West as Sgt. Keen

== Preservation ==
With no prints of The Trail of the Shadow located in any film archives, it is considered a lost film.
