= Roseville, Kentucky =

Roseville, Kentucky may refer to the following places in Kentucky:

- Roseville, Barren County, Kentucky
- Roseville, Hancock County, Kentucky
