= Lewisport Masonic Lodge =

- U.S. National Register of Historic Places
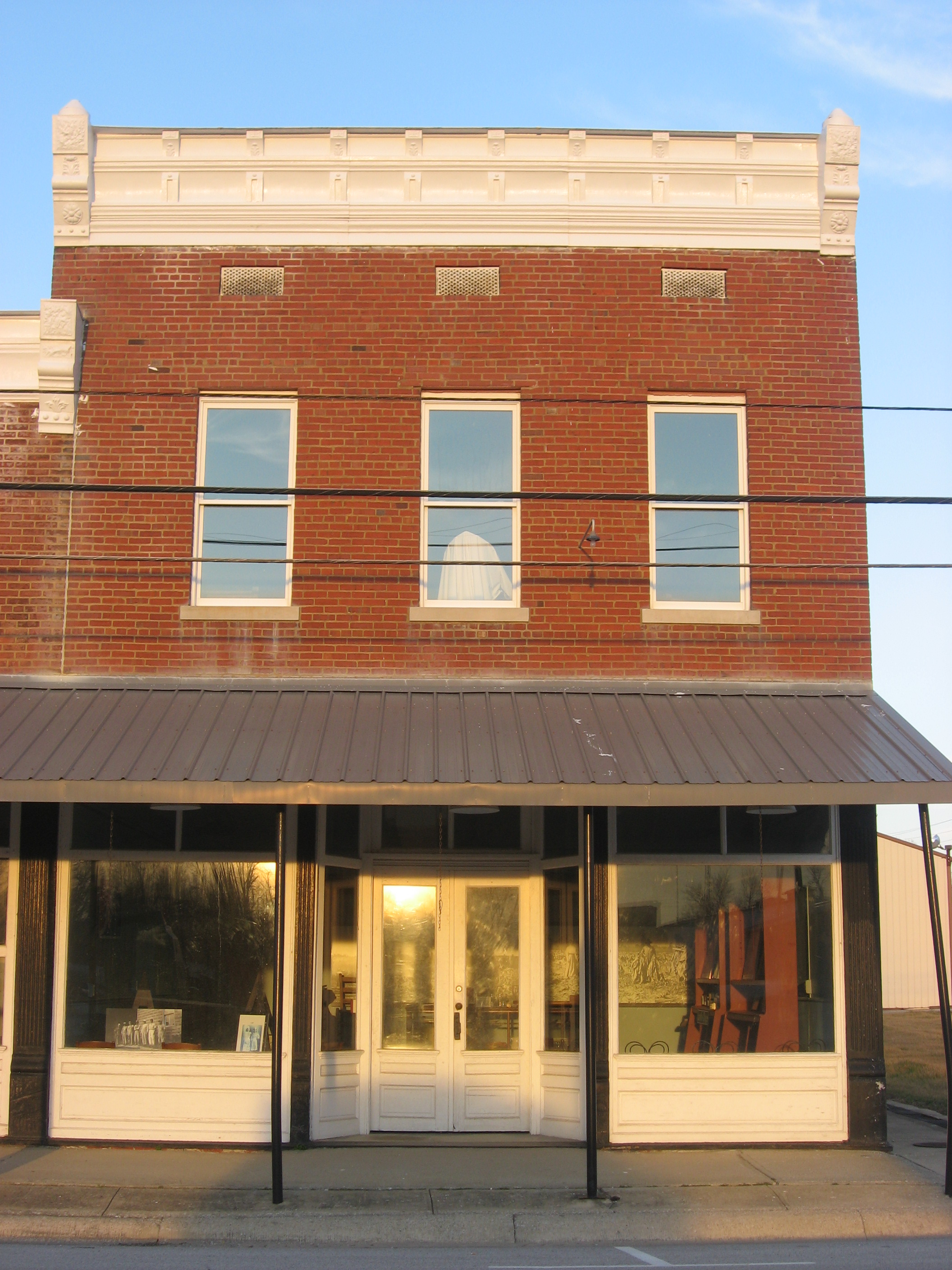

- Location within Kentucky
- Location: 4th St., Lewisport, Kentucky
- Coordinates: 37°56′11″N 86°54′07″W
- Area: less than one acre
- Architect: Jason J. Cooper
- MPS: Lewisport MRA
- NRHP reference No.: 84001541
- Added to NRHP: August 1, 1984

The Lewisport Masonic Lodge, on 4th St. in Lewisport, Kentucky, is a masonic lodge that has been listed on the National Register of Historic Places since 1984.

It has an original pressed tin cornice, an original cast iron storefront, and an original pressed tin ceiling.
