= 1952 United States presidential election in Kentucky =

- November 4, 1952

All 10 Kentucky votes to the Electoral College

Nominee	Adlai Stevenson	Dwight D. Eisenhower
Party	Democratic	Republican
Home state	Illinois	New York
Running mate	John Sparkman	Richard Nixon
Electoral vote	10	0
Popular vote	495,729	495,029
Percentage	49.91%	49.84%
County results
Stevenson
40–50%
50–60%
60–70%
70–80%
80–90%
Eisenhower
50–60%
60–70%
70–80%
80–90%
President before election
Harry S. Truman
Democratic
Elected President
Dwight D. Eisenhower
Republican

The 1952 United States presidential election in Kentucky took place on November 4, 1952, as part of the 1952 United States presidential election. Kentucky voters chose 10 representatives, or electors, to the Electoral College, who voted for president and vice president.

Kentucky was won by Adlai Stevenson (D–Illinois), running with Senator John Sparkman, with 49.91 percent of the popular vote, against Columbia University President Dwight D. Eisenhower (R–New York), running with Senator Richard Nixon, with 49.84 percent of the popular vote. The race in Kentucky was the closest in the nation, with the candidates separated by a mere 700 votes, or 0.07 percent of the vote, and in fact was the closest presidential election in any state since New Hampshire was won by Woodrow Wilson by 56 votes in 1916.

As of 2024, this is the last time a Republican won the presidency without carrying Kentucky, as well as the last time that a non-Southern Democrat would carry the state. It is also the most recent election in which Kentucky supported a different candidate than Tennessee (coincidentally, the closest Eisenhower state in this election).

== Results ==
1952 United States presidential election in Kentucky
Party	Candidate	Votes	%
Democratic	Adlai Stevenson	495,729	49.91%
Republican	Dwight D. Eisenhower	495,029	49.84%
Prohibition	Stuart Hamblen	1,161	0.12%
Socialist Labor	Eric Hass	893	0.09%
Progressive	Vincent Hallinan	336	0.03%
Total votes		993,148	100%

=== Results by county ===
County	Adlai Stevenson Democratic		Dwight D. Eisenhower Republican		Stuart Hamblen Prohibition		Eric Hass Socialist Labor		Vincent Hallinan Progressive		Margin		Total votes cast
County	#	%	#	%	#	%	#	%	#	%	#	%	Total votes cast
Adair	2,184	36.85%	3,737	63.05%	2	0.03%	4	0.07%	0	0.00%	-1,553	-26.20%	5,927
Allen	1,750	37.10%	2,946	62.45%	18	0.38%	2	0.04%	1	0.02%	-1,196	-25.35%	4,717
Anderson	2,153	59.69%	1,445	40.06%	7	0.19%	2	0.06%	0	0.00%	708	19.63%	3,607
Ballard	2,910	77.25%	851	22.59%	4	0.11%	2	0.05%	0	0.00%	2,059	54.66%	3,767
Barren	4,618	55.21%	3,743	44.75%	4	0.05%	0	0.00%	0	0.00%	875	10.46%	8,365
Bath	2,400	57.94%	1,737	41.94%	3	0.07%	1	0.02%	1	0.02%	663	16.00%	4,142
Bell	5,276	44.86%	6,461	54.94%	11	0.09%	12	0.10%	1	0.01%	-1,185	-10.08%	11,761
Boone	2,620	52.97%	2,309	46.68%	12	0.24%	3	0.06%	2	0.04%	311	6.29%	4,946
Bourbon	3,339	59.95%	2,229	40.02%	2	0.04%	0	0.00%	0	0.00%	1,110	19.93%	5,570
Boyd	10,245	49.44%	10,426	50.32%	34	0.16%	5	0.02%	10	0.05%	-181	-0.88%	20,720
Boyle	3,771	55.76%	2,969	43.90%	18	0.27%	1	0.01%	4	0.06%	802	11.86%	6,763
Bracken	1,753	50.90%	1,690	49.07%	1	0.03%	0	0.00%	0	0.00%	63	1.83%	3,444
Breathitt	3,383	71.01%	1,381	28.99%	0	0.00%	0	0.00%	0	0.00%	2,002	42.02%	4,764
Breckinridge	2,828	47.75%	3,078	51.98%	9	0.15%	6	0.10%	1	0.02%	-250	-4.23%	5,922
Bullitt	2,121	62.05%	1,292	37.80%	5	0.15%	0	0.00%	0	0.00%	829	24.25%	3,418
Butler	1,157	27.78%	2,996	71.93%	5	0.12%	4	0.10%	3	0.07%	-1,839	-44.15%	4,165
Caldwell	2,133	45.87%	2,507	53.91%	5	0.11%	4	0.09%	1	0.02%	-374	-8.04%	4,650
Calloway	5,434	74.69%	1,829	25.14%	4	0.05%	7	0.10%	1	0.01%	3,605	49.55%	7,275
Campbell	12,976	42.25%	17,705	57.64%	12	0.04%	15	0.05%	8	0.03%	-4,729	-15.39%	30,716
Carlisle	1,867	73.97%	656	25.99%	1	0.04%	0	0.00%	0	0.00%	1,211	47.98%	2,524
Carroll	2,605	71.72%	1,019	28.06%	8	0.22%	0	0.00%	0	0.00%	1,586	43.66%	3,632
Carter	3,019	41.57%	4,221	58.12%	11	0.15%	6	0.08%	5	0.07%	-1,202	-16.55%	7,262
Casey	1,522	28.36%	3,831	71.39%	4	0.07%	7	0.13%	2	0.04%	-2,309	-43.03%	5,366
Christian	6,787	58.15%	4,858	41.62%	15	0.13%	7	0.06%	5	0.04%	1,929	16.53%	11,672
Clark	3,620	58.27%	2,592	41.73%	0	0.00%	0	0.00%	0	0.00%	1,028	16.54%	6,212
Clay	1,365	24.62%	4,161	75.05%	1	0.02%	15	0.27%	2	0.04%	-2,796	-50.43%	5,544
Clinton	678	19.12%	2,856	80.54%	4	0.11%	7	0.20%	1	0.03%	-2,178	-61.42%	3,546
Crittenden	1,427	36.46%	2,471	63.13%	8	0.20%	7	0.18%	1	0.03%	-1,044	-26.67%	3,914
Cumberland	909	27.14%	2,426	72.44%	5	0.15%	7	0.21%	2	0.06%	-1,517	-45.30%	3,349
Daviess	7,522	41.77%	10,462	58.09%	16	0.09%	7	0.04%	3	0.02%	-2,940	-16.32%	18,010
Edmonson	992	30.31%	2,279	69.63%	2	0.06%	0	0.00%	0	0.00%	-1,287	-39.32%	3,273
Elliott	2,074	76.73%	629	23.27%	0	0.00%	0	0.00%	0	0.00%	1,445	53.46%	2,703
Estill	1,900	41.76%	2,630	57.80%	13	0.29%	5	0.11%	2	0.04%	-730	-16.04%	4,550
Fayette	14,275	44.91%	17,376	54.66%	31	0.10%	86	0.27%	21	0.07%	-3,101	-9.75%	31,789
Fleming	2,446	48.44%	2,592	51.33%	3	0.06%	9	0.18%	0	0.00%	-146	-2.89%	5,050
Floyd	8,940	67.78%	4,238	32.13%	7	0.05%	2	0.02%	2	0.02%	4,702	35.65%	13,189
Franklin	7,309	70.20%	3,097	29.75%	4	0.04%	1	0.01%	0	0.00%	4,212	40.45%	10,411
Fulton	2,673	67.81%	1,266	32.12%	1	0.03%	2	0.05%	0	0.00%	1,407	35.69%	3,942
Gallatin	1,383	74.72%	465	25.12%	2	0.11%	1	0.05%	0	0.00%	918	49.60%	1,851
Garrard	1,927	44.49%	2,398	55.37%	4	0.09%	1	0.02%	1	0.02%	-471	-10.88%	4,331
Grant	2,545	61.16%	1,609	38.67%	6	0.14%	1	0.02%	0	0.00%	936	22.49%	4,161
Graves	9,592	76.55%	2,925	23.34%	4	0.03%	4	0.03%	5	0.04%	6,667	53.21%	12,530
Grayson	2,341	36.80%	4,011	63.05%	4	0.06%	6	0.09%	0	0.00%	-1,670	-26.25%	6,362
Green	1,857	40.01%	2,773	59.75%	7	0.15%	4	0.09%	0	0.00%	-916	-19.74%	4,641
Greenup	4,716	51.95%	4,354	47.96%	3	0.03%	3	0.03%	2	0.02%	362	3.99%	9,078
Hancock	1,177	46.61%	1,341	53.11%	2	0.08%	2	0.08%	3	0.12%	-164	-6.50%	2,525
Hardin	4,599	53.74%	3,914	45.73%	35	0.41%	7	0.08%	3	0.04%	685	8.01%	8,558
Harlan	10,025	57.85%	7,284	42.03%	7	0.04%	12	0.07%	2	0.01%	2,741	15.82%	17,330
Harrison	3,367	64.26%	1,866	35.61%	2	0.04%	3	0.06%	2	0.04%	1,501	28.65%	5,240
Hart	2,952	50.01%	2,934	49.70%	7	0.12%	7	0.12%	3	0.05%	18	0.31%	5,903
Henderson	5,913	54.28%	4,929	45.25%	43	0.39%	4	0.04%	4	0.04%	984	9.03%	10,893
Henry	3,468	68.51%	1,584	31.29%	8	0.16%	1	0.02%	1	0.02%	1,884	37.22%	5,062
Hickman	1,988	69.39%	871	30.40%	3	0.10%	1	0.03%	2	0.07%	1,117	38.99%	2,865
Hopkins	7,157	62.40%	4,285	37.36%	14	0.12%	5	0.04%	8	0.07%	2,872	25.04%	11,469
Jackson	471	13.16%	3,104	86.75%	1	0.03%	2	0.06%	0	0.00%	-2,633	-73.59%	3,578
Jefferson	81,642	44.99%	99,069	54.60%	290	0.16%	343	0.19%	103	0.06%	-17,427	-9.61%	181,447
Jessamine	2,578	53.80%	2,193	45.76%	17	0.35%	4	0.08%	0	0.00%	385	8.04%	4,792
Johnson	2,654	33.78%	5,199	66.18%	2	0.03%	1	0.01%	0	0.00%	-2,545	-32.40%	7,856
Kenton	19,457	50.26%	19,200	49.60%	25	0.06%	15	0.04%	12	0.03%	257	0.66%	38,709
Knott	4,437	79.49%	1,124	20.14%	21	0.38%	0	0.00%	0	0.00%	3,313	59.35%	5,582
Knox	2,766	33.52%	5,470	66.28%	16	0.19%	1	0.01%	0	0.00%	-2,704	-32.76%	8,253
LaRue	2,161	55.96%	1,701	44.04%	0	0.00%	0	0.00%	0	0.00%	460	11.92%	3,862
Laurel	2,263	28.11%	5,776	71.74%	4	0.05%	7	0.09%	1	0.01%	-3,513	-43.63%	8,051
Lawrence	2,597	48.98%	2,696	50.85%	5	0.09%	3	0.06%	1	0.02%	-99	-1.87%	5,302
Lee	1,100	41.08%	1,572	58.70%	1	0.04%	5	0.19%	0	0.00%	-472	-17.62%	2,678
Leslie	705	17.81%	3,239	81.81%	6	0.15%	7	0.18%	2	0.05%	-2,534	-64.00%	3,959
Letcher	5,097	52.08%	4,689	47.92%	0	0.00%	0	0.00%	0	0.00%	408	4.16%	9,786
Lewis	1,556	31.83%	3,317	67.86%	4	0.08%	9	0.18%	2	0.04%	-1,761	-36.03%	4,888
Lincoln	2,910	47.60%	3,186	52.11%	12	0.20%	4	0.07%	2	0.03%	-276	-4.51%	6,114
Livingston	1,554	58.49%	1,102	41.48%	1	0.04%	0	0.00%	0	0.00%	452	17.01%	2,657
Logan	4,917	63.94%	2,758	35.86%	8	0.10%	3	0.04%	4	0.05%	2,159	28.08%	7,690
Lyon	1,404	65.06%	746	34.57%	4	0.19%	1	0.05%	3	0.14%	658	30.49%	2,158
Madison	5,901	49.94%	5,886	49.82%	21	0.18%	4	0.03%	3	0.03%	15	0.12%	11,815
Magoffin	2,243	51.66%	2,093	48.20%	4	0.09%	2	0.05%	0	0.00%	150	3.46%	4,342
Marion	3,159	58.19%	2,262	41.67%	5	0.09%	3	0.06%	0	0.00%	897	16.52%	5,429
Marshall	3,445	69.82%	1,474	29.87%	8	0.16%	5	0.10%	2	0.04%	1,971	39.95%	4,934
Martin	1,174	30.77%	2,641	69.23%	0	0.00%	0	0.00%	0	0.00%	-1,467	-38.46%	3,815
Mason	3,614	50.00%	3,606	49.89%	1	0.01%	7	0.10%	0	0.00%	8	0.11%	7,228
McCracken	12,302	66.95%	6,051	32.93%	13	0.07%	5	0.03%	4	0.02%	6,251	34.02%	18,375
McCreary	937	21.75%	3,360	77.98%	3	0.07%	5	0.12%	4	0.09%	-2,423	-56.23%	4,309
McLean	1,961	52.11%	1,791	47.60%	9	0.24%	2	0.05%	0	0.00%	170	4.51%	3,763
Meade	2,040	61.63%	1,265	38.22%	4	0.12%	1	0.03%	0	0.00%	775	23.41%	3,310
Menifee	1,219	65.43%	638	34.25%	3	0.16%	3	0.16%	0	0.00%	581	31.18%	1,863
Mercer	2,740	51.58%	2,545	47.91%	18	0.34%	3	0.06%	6	0.11%	195	3.67%	5,312
Metcalfe	1,848	45.78%	2,176	53.90%	4	0.10%	8	0.20%	1	0.02%	-328	-8.12%	4,037
Monroe	1,084	22.78%	3,675	77.22%	0	0.00%	0	0.00%	0	0.00%	-2,591	-54.44%	4,759
Montgomery	2,653	57.08%	1,981	42.62%	9	0.19%	4	0.09%	1	0.02%	672	14.46%	4,648
Morgan	3,161	70.62%	1,311	29.29%	4	0.09%	0	0.00%	0	0.00%	1,850	41.33%	4,476
Muhlenberg	5,037	51.34%	4,761	48.52%	2	0.02%	10	0.10%	2	0.02%	276	2.82%	9,812
Nelson	3,417	52.62%	3,064	47.18%	8	0.12%	3	0.05%	2	0.03%	353	5.44%	6,494
Nicholas	1,819	61.06%	1,156	38.80%	4	0.13%	0	0.00%	0	0.00%	663	22.26%	2,979
Ohio	2,700	37.80%	4,428	62.00%	13	0.18%	1	0.01%	0	0.00%	-1,728	-24.20%	7,142
Oldham	1,735	49.91%	1,723	49.57%	13	0.37%	2	0.06%	3	0.09%	12	0.34%	3,476
Owen	3,174	79.35%	819	20.48%	4	0.10%	3	0.08%	0	0.00%	2,355	58.87%	4,000
Owsley	419	17.55%	1,954	81.86%	2	0.08%	12	0.50%	0	0.00%	-1,535	-64.31%	2,387
Pendleton	1,993	51.21%	1,895	48.69%	2	0.05%	2	0.05%	0	0.00%	98	2.52%	3,892
Perry	5,538	51.46%	5,210	48.41%	3	0.03%	9	0.08%	2	0.02%	328	3.05%	10,762
Pike	12,761	56.50%	9,778	43.29%	11	0.05%	21	0.09%	14	0.06%	2,983	13.21%	22,585
Powell	1,218	55.04%	992	44.83%	2	0.09%	1	0.05%	0	0.00%	226	10.21%	2,213
Pulaski	4,032	29.42%	9,651	70.41%	13	0.09%	6	0.04%	5	0.04%	-5,619	-40.99%	13,707
Robertson	827	57.00%	623	42.94%	1	0.07%	0	0.00%	0	0.00%	204	14.06%	1,451
Rockcastle	1,326	27.39%	3,503	72.35%	8	0.17%	5	0.10%	0	0.00%	-2,177	-44.96%	4,842
Rowan	2,220	52.66%	1,985	47.08%	7	0.17%	4	0.09%	0	0.00%	235	5.58%	4,216
Russell	1,171	28.60%	2,913	71.14%	3	0.07%	4	0.10%	4	0.10%	-1,742	-42.54%	4,095
Scott	3,171	60.27%	2,077	39.48%	8	0.15%	1	0.02%	4	0.08%	1,094	20.79%	5,261
Shelby	4,076	62.12%	2,474	37.70%	7	0.11%	4	0.06%	1	0.02%	1,602	24.42%	6,562
Simpson	2,724	67.43%	1,310	32.43%	4	0.10%	1	0.02%	1	0.02%	1,414	35.00%	4,040
Spencer	1,283	63.93%	723	36.02%	1	0.05%	0	0.00%	0	0.00%	560	27.91%	2,007
Taylor	2,439	43.62%	3,126	55.90%	23	0.41%	2	0.04%	2	0.04%	-687	-12.28%	5,592
Todd	2,995	67.82%	1,401	31.73%	15	0.34%	2	0.05%	3	0.07%	1,594	36.09%	4,416
Trigg	2,585	69.40%	1,134	30.44%	4	0.11%	2	0.05%	0	0.00%	1,451	38.96%	3,725
Trimble	1,855	82.81%	370	16.52%	15	0.67%	0	0.00%	0	0.00%	1,485	66.29%	2,240
Union	3,445	63.54%	1,967	36.28%	3	0.06%	3	0.06%	4	0.07%	1,478	27.26%	5,422
Warren	7,106	49.32%	7,267	50.44%	22	0.15%	7	0.05%	5	0.03%	-161	-1.12%	14,407
Washington	2,114	47.88%	2,290	51.87%	8	0.18%	3	0.07%	0	0.00%	-176	-3.99%	4,415
Wayne	2,461	41.99%	3,396	57.94%	2	0.03%	2	0.03%	0	0.00%	-935	-15.95%	5,861
Webster	3,516	65.28%	1,858	34.50%	6	0.11%	5	0.09%	1	0.02%	1,658	30.78%	5,386
Whitley	2,958	29.55%	7,030	70.22%	7	0.07%	11	0.11%	5	0.05%	-4,072	-40.67%	10,011
Wolfe	1,557	63.94%	876	35.98%	2	0.08%	0	0.00%	0	0.00%	681	27.96%	2,435
Woodford	2,319	55.60%	1,845	44.23%	3	0.07%	4	0.10%	0	0.00%	474	11.37%	4,171
Totals	495,729	49.91%	495,029	49.84%	1,161	0.12%	893	0.09%	336	0.03%	700	0.07%	993,148

==== Counties that flipped from Democratic to Republican ====
- Bell
- Boyd
- Breckinridge
- Caldwell
- Campbell
- Daviess
- Fayette
- Fleming
- Hancock
- Jefferson
- Lawrence
- Lincoln
- Metcalfe
- Taylor
- Warren
- Washington

== See also ==
- United States presidential elections in Kentucky
