= TeraWulf =

American bitcoin mining company

TeraWulf Inc.
- Trade name: Nasdaq: WULF
- Type: Public
- Industry: Cryptocurrency mining
- Founded: January 2021; 5 years ago
- Founder: Paul B. Prager; Nazar Khan
- Headquarters: 9 Federal Street, Easton, Maryland, United States
- Key people: Paul B. Prager (Chairman & CEO); Nazar Khan (COO)
- Services: Bitcoin mining
- Website: www.terawulf.com

TeraWulf Inc. is an American bitcoin mining company. Founded in 2021 and publicly listed on Nasdaq under the ticker WULF, it operates mining facilities in New York and Pennsylvania.

== History ==
TeraWulf Inc. was incorporated in January 2021 by Paul Prager and Nazar Khan, both of whom have backgrounds in the energy sector through Prager's private firm, Beowulf Energy LLC. Paul Prager serves as chairman and CEO, and Nazar Khan as COO. The company was established to develop and operate data center infrastructure for Bitcoin mining. TeraWulf is involved in constructing and operating large-scale data centers equipped with computers (miners) that solve complex mathematical problems to validate transactions on the Bitcoin network and earn new Bitcoin as a reward. These mining facilities are in New York and Pennsylvania, including the Lake Mariner site, with a focus on scaling its computational capacity and energy infrastructure. In February 2026, TeraWulf Inc., announced it will purchase and redevelop the former Century Aluminum Company's smelter site, in Hawesville, Kentucky, with more than 250 buildable acres, into a digital infrastructure campus supporting high-performance computing and artificial intelligence workloads. Century Aluminum will retain a non-controlling minority equity stake in the development. A second site was purchased in Morgantown, Maryland.

In December 2021, TeraWulf became publicly traded on the Nasdaq under the ticker symbol WULF through a reverse merger with Ikonics Corporation, a special purpose acquisition company. Following its public listing, the company pursued expansion through a series of capital raises, including the issuance of convertible debt, preferred stock, and at-the-market (ATM) offerings of common stock.

In June 2022, TeraWulf entered into a standby equity purchase agreement with an affiliate of Yorkville Advisors, allowing the company to sell up to $50 million of its common stock over time. The proceeds from these financings were used to support the development of its mining facilities and the acquisition of mining equipment.

In July 2026, TeraWulf announced Anthropic the California-based artificial intelligence company known for its Claude platform, signed a 20-year lease for a data center in development, in a campus called, Justified Data, in Hawesville, Kentucky. The lease is expected to generate approximately $19 billion of contracted revenue over the initial lease term.

== Controversies and allegations ==
=== "Zero-carbon" and greenwashing allegations ===
One of TeraWulf's principal pillars to investors is its claim to be a "zero-carbon Bitcoin miner". In August 2024, an investigative report by Hunterbrook Media challenged these claims. The report alleged that TeraWulf could not legally substantiate its renewable energy claims without purchasing Renewable Energy Credits (RECs), which it had not done. Prager's energy company, Beowulf Energy LLC, has a history in fossil fuels. In 2020, it revived a struggling coal plant in Hardin, Montana, to provide power for a Bitcoin mining operation for Marathon Digital Holdings. This project was cited by Hunterbrook as contradicting TeraWulf's narrative of a pure "zero-carbon" heritage.

=== Related-party transactions and self-dealing ===
TeraWulf has faced scrutiny for its financial transactions with entities linked to its CEO, Paul Prager, with critical reports from firms like Grizzly Research alleging these dealings have transferred value from shareholders to corporate insiders. Beowulf E&D, a company owned by Prager, entered into a multi-year "Administrative and Infrastructure Services Agreement" with Terawulf, under which Beowulf provides a wide range of services, including construction, engineering, operations, maintenance, and corporate functions. In 2023 alone, TeraWulf paid $20.3 million in management and service fees to Beowulf E&D. This accounted for approximately 38% of TeraWulf's total operating and administrative expenses that year.

==== Lake Mariner Lease ====
TeraWulf leases the land for its flagship Lake Mariner facility from Somerset Operating Company LLC, another entity 99.9% owned by Prager. In addition to rent, TeraWulf issued 8.5 million shares to this entity in 2022 as part of a lease amendment—a payment valued at the time at $11.5 million, which critics argued was vastly disproportionate to the original lease terms.

=== Ties to Past Stock Promotion Scandals ===
TeraWulf's second-largest shareholder was reportedly an entity controlled by Bryan Pascual, who was implicated in helping Riot Blockchain's management hide related-party transactions in 2018. Its third-largest shareholder was an entity controlled by the wife of John O'Rourke, the former CEO of Riot Blockchain, who was charged by the SEC for his role in a $27 million market manipulation scheme.

John O'Rourke has been reported to have deep ties with stock promoter Barry Honig, who was subsequently barred by the SEC from participating in penny stock offerings. O'Rourke was reportedly instrumental in arranging several of TeraWulf's early financings.
