= One South Wacker =

Office skyscraper in Chicago, Illinois

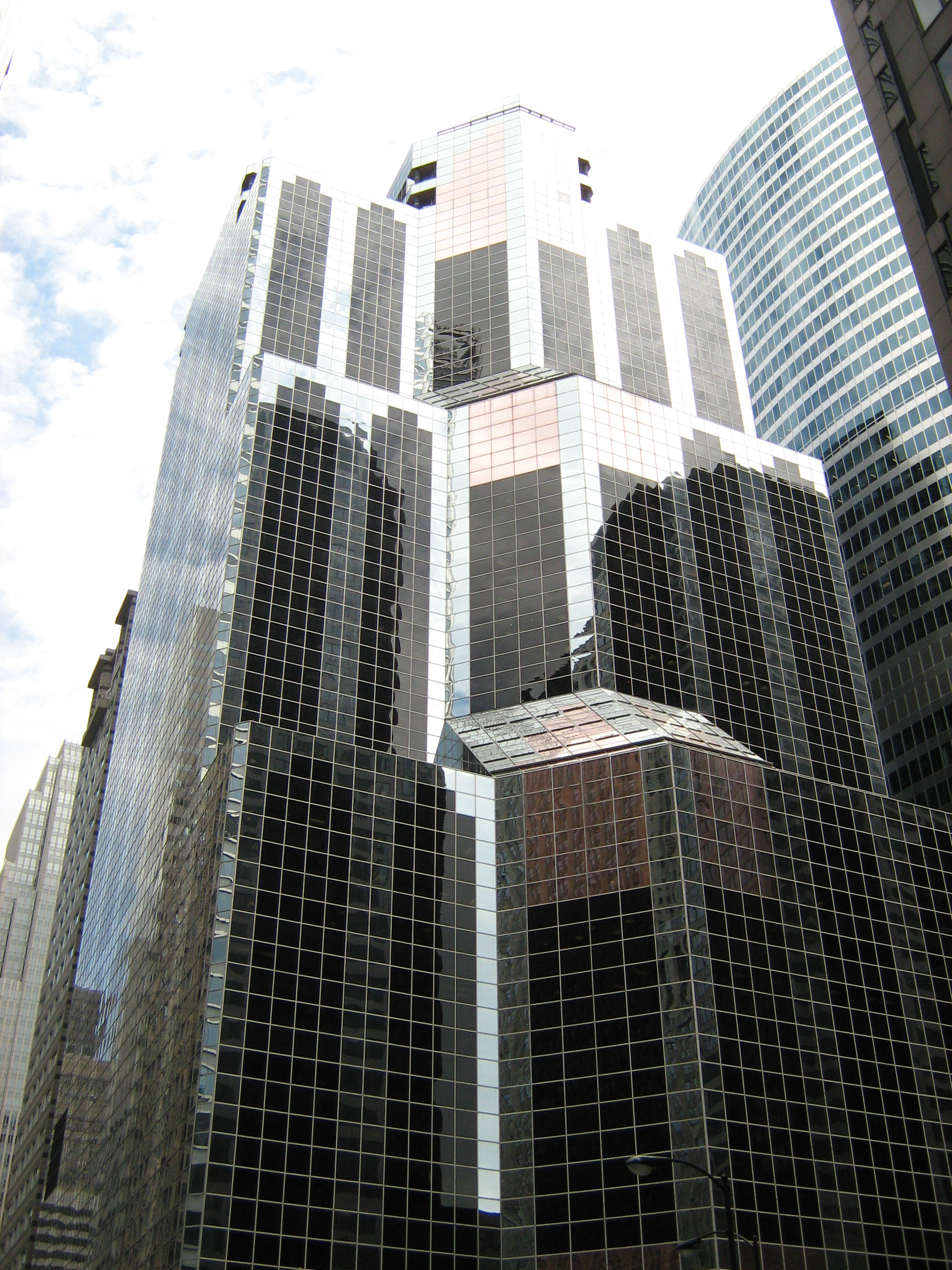
- Interactive map of the One South Wacker area

General information
- Type: Office
- Location: 1 South Wacker Drive, Chicago, Illinois
- Coordinates: 41.8816°N 87.6362°W
- Construction started: 1979
- Completed: 1982

Height
- Roof: 550 ft (170 m)

Technical details
- Floor count: 40
- Floor area: 108,138 m^{2} (1,163,990 sq ft)

Design and construction
- Architects: Murphy/Jahn, Inc. Architects

One South Wacker is a 550 ft (168 m) tall 40-floor skyscraper in Chicago, Illinois, United States, designed by Murphy/Jahn, Inc. Architects, and constructed from 1979 to 1982. As of April 2025, it is the 91st tallest building in Chicago.

The music video for "Burnin'" by Daft Punk was filmed at the tower.

In 2018, the building was purchased by 601W Companies for $310 million.

== Facilities ==
The tower has a 3-floor lounge and a health club.

== Tenants ==
- HNTB
- Century Aluminum
- Invenergy

== See also ==
- List of tallest buildings in Chicago
