= Immaculate Conception Church (Hawesville, Kentucky) =

Historic church in Kentucky, United States

- U.S. National Register of Historic Places
- Location within Kentucky Location within the United States
- Location: Water St., Hawesville, Kentucky
- Coordinates: 37°54′21″N 86°45′13″W
- Area: less than one acre
- Built: 1860
- NRHP reference No.: 75000766
- Added to NRHP: June 18, 1975

The Immaculate Conception Church in Hawesville, Kentucky, was a historic Roman Catholic church building on Water Street. It was built in 1860, and added to the National Register of Historic Places in 1975.

Its 1975 National Register nomination states:

The Hawesville Immaculate Conception Church is an example of the determination of a small but devout religious group to build and maintain a church. The early people of this church maintained it without the guidance of a permanent priest. They worked until they had constructed a building in which to worship. The building was small and simple but surprisingly monumental, without any striking decoration, except for the traditional stained glass windows and the intrinsic beauty of the stone of which it was constructed. The church building expressed the simple dignity of a people whose religion was the focal point of their community as well as spiritual life.

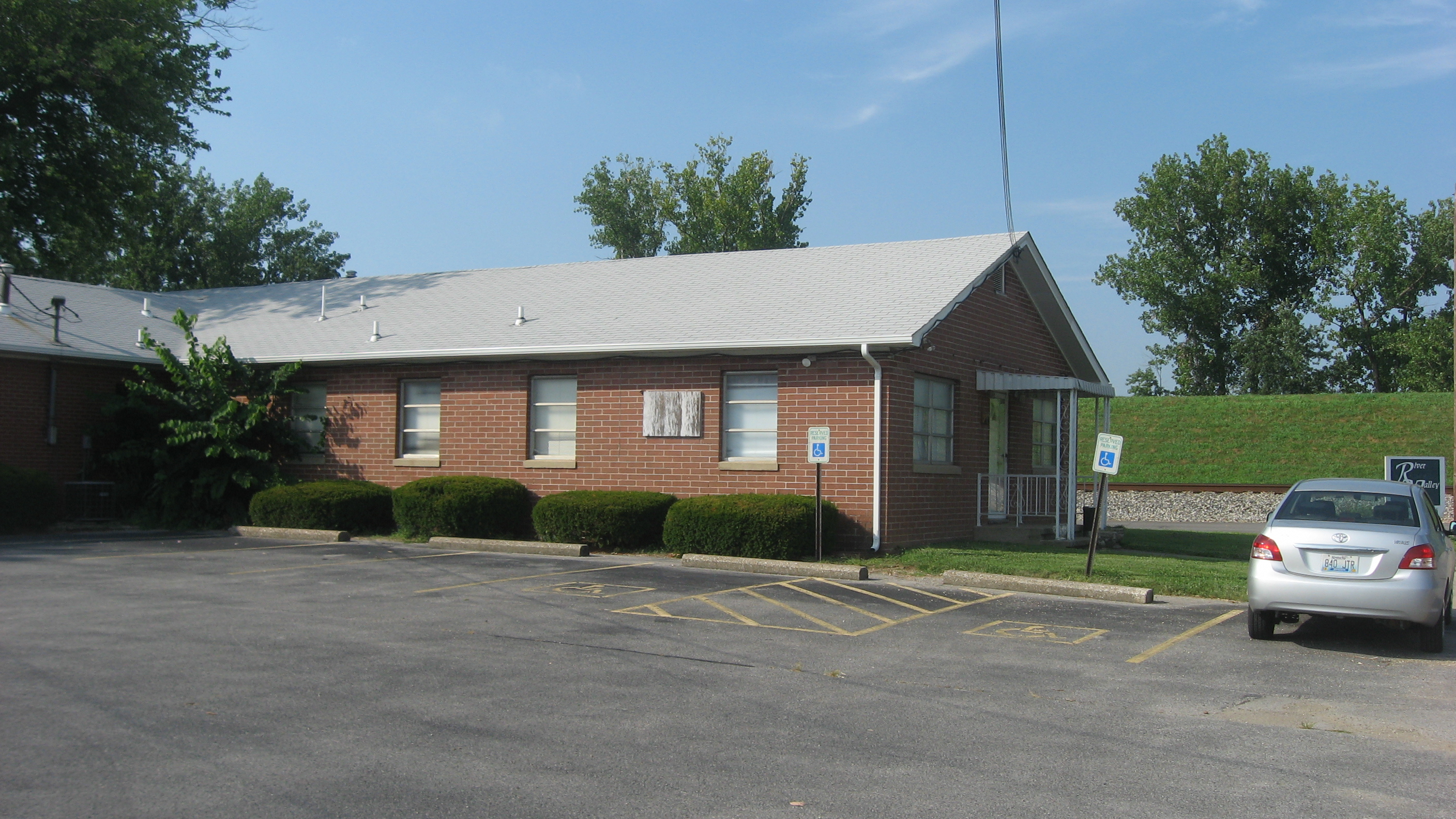
Building on the site of the church

The more modern church building which replaced it has subsequently been deconsecrated; River Valley Behavioral Health now occupies the site of the former Immaculate Conception Church, which has not been removed from the Register despite the demolition of the original, historic building. The congregation still exists, meeting in a different facility in the Hawesville area.
