= Hancock County Courthouse (Kentucky) =

- U.S. National Register of Historic Places
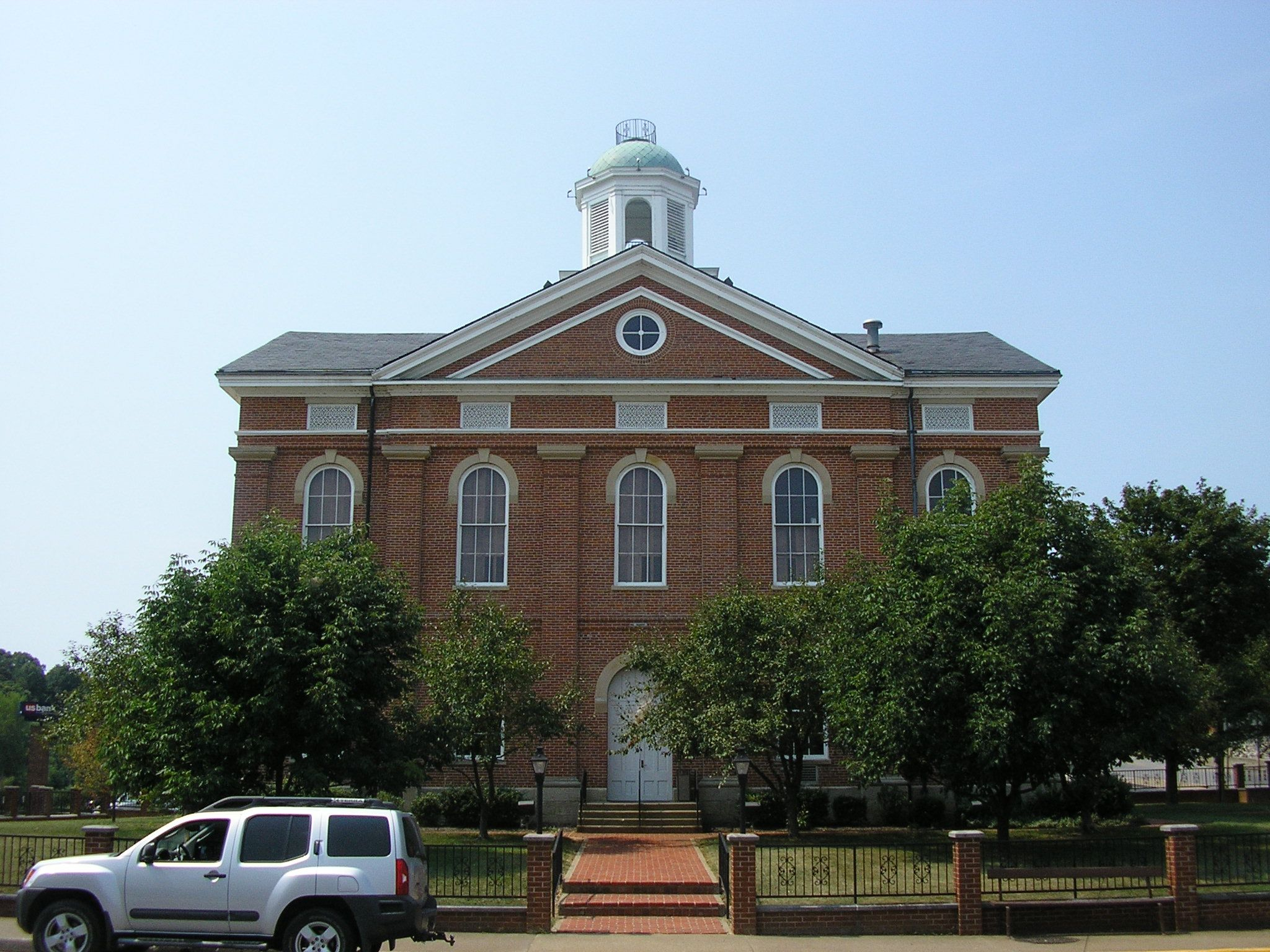

- Location within Kentucky Location within the United States
- Interactive map showing the location of Hancock County Courthouse
- Location: Courthouse Sq., Hawesville, Kentucky
- Coordinates: 37°54′03″N 86°44′58″W
- Area: 1 acre (0.40 ha)
- Built: 1859
- Architectural style: Greek Revival, Italianate
- NRHP reference No.: 75000765
- Added to NRHP: June 18, 1975

The Hancock County Courthouse in Hawesville, Kentucky is an 1859-built courthouse which was listed on the National Register of Historic Places in 1975.

It is a two-and-a-half-story building, designed by a Robert Boyd of Boston, Massachusetts. It has an octagonal cupola.
