= Roseville, Hancock County, Kentucky =

Unincorporated community in Kentucky, United States

- Unincorporated community
- Location within Kentucky Location within the United States
- Coordinates: 37°43′02″N 86°45′18″W
- Country: United States
- State: Kentucky
- County: Hancock
- Elevation: 512 ft (156 m)
- Time zone: UTC-6 (Central (CST))
  - Summer (DST): UTC-5 (CDT)
- Area code: 270
- GNIS feature ID: 508976

Roseville is an unincorporated community in Hancock County, Kentucky, United States. Roseville is located on Kentucky Route 69, 6 miles (9.7 km) north-northwest of Fordsville.
