= Hancock County, Kentucky =

County in Kentucky, United States

- County
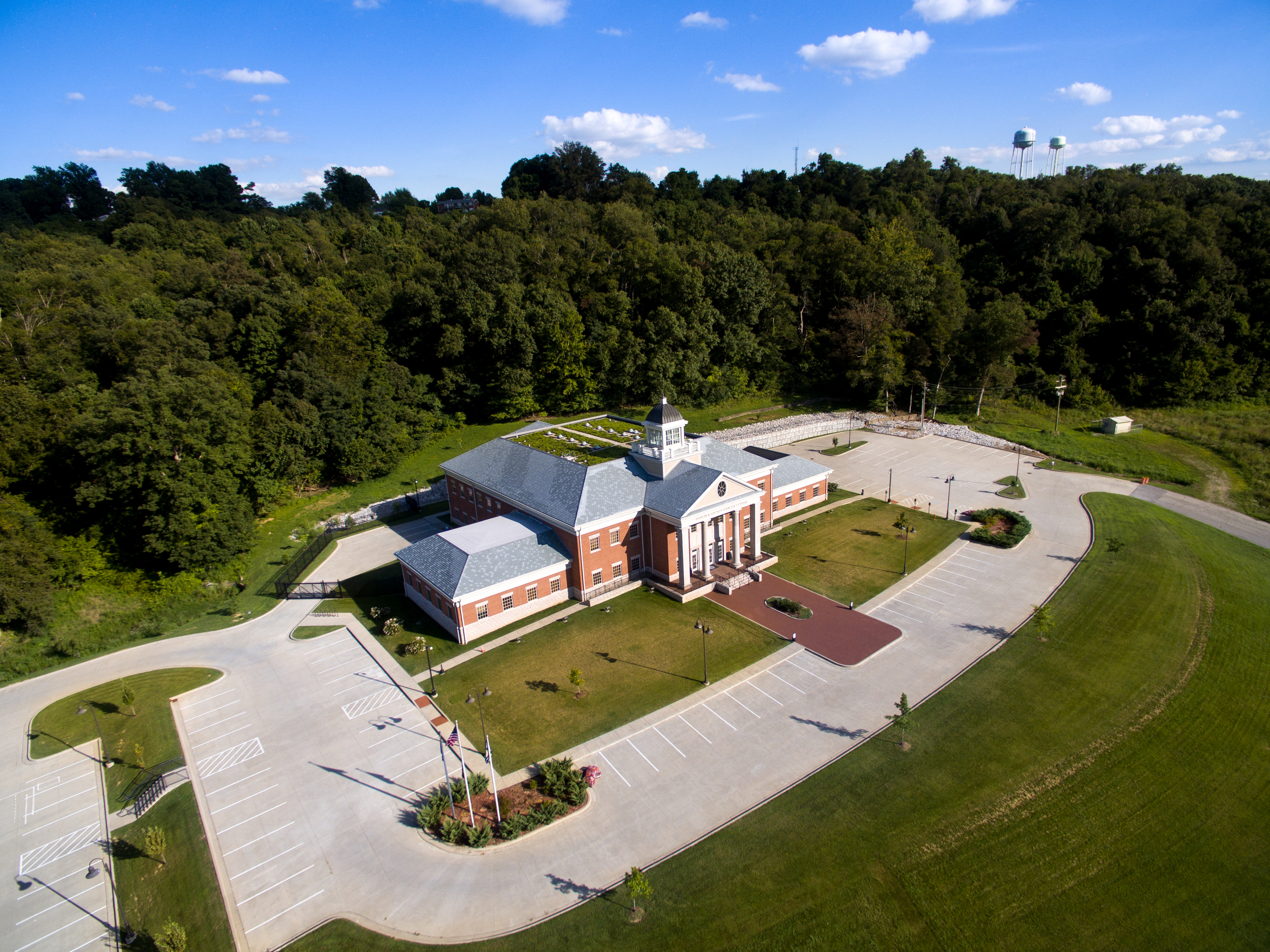
- Hancock County courthouse in Hawesville, KY

- Flag Seal

- Location within the U.S. state of Kentucky
- Coordinates: 37°50′N 86°47′W
- Country: United States
- State: Kentucky
- Founded: 1829
- Named for: John Hancock
- Seat: Hawesville
- Largest city: Lewisport

Government
  - Judge/Executive: Johnny W. Roberts Jr. (R)

Area
  - Total: 199 sq mi (520 km^{2})
  - Land: 188 sq mi (490 km^{2})
  - Water: 11 sq mi (28 km^{2}) 5.6%

Population (2020)
  - Total: 9,095
  - Estimate (2025): 9,050 ▼
  - Density: 48.4/sq mi (18.7/km^{2})
- Time zone: UTC−6 (Central)
  - Summer (DST): UTC−5 (CDT)
- Congressional district: 2nd
- Website: www.hancockky.us

Hancock County is a county located in the U.S. state of Kentucky. As of the 2020 census, the population was 9,095. Its county seat is in the city of Hawesville located in the Northern part of the county, and its largest city of Lewisport is located in the Northwestern part of the county.

Hancock County is included in the Owensboro metropolitan area.

The Hancock County Board of Education consists of 4 public school systems. Hancock County High School (HCHS), Hancock County Middle School (HCMS), South Hancock Elementary School, & North Hancock Elementary School (NHES). North Hancock Elementary School being the only one located in Lewisport. NHES replaced the previously outdated Lewisport Elementary School with a newly constructed $8,829,532 building.

== History ==
Hancock County was formed in 1829 from portions of Breckinridge, Daviess, and Ohio counties. The county is named for John Hancock, President of the Continental Congress and one of the signers of the Declaration of Independence.

The courthouse, the second to serve the county, was built in 1868 and renovated in 1978.

== Geography ==
According to the U.S. Census Bureau, the county has a total area of 199 square miles (520 km^{2}), of which 188 square miles (490 km^{2}) is land and 11 square miles (28 km^{2}) (5.6%) is water. The northern border of the county lies along the Ohio River.

=== Adjacent counties ===
- Spencer County, Indiana (northwest)
- Perry County, Indiana (northeast)
- Breckinridge County (southeast)
- Ohio County (south)
- Daviess County (west)

== Demographics ==
Historical population
Census	Pop.	Note	%±
1830	1,515		—
1840	2,581		70.4%
1850	3,853		49.3%
1860	6,213		61.3%
1870	6,591		6.1%
1880	8,563		29.9%
1890	9,214		7.6%
1900	8,914		−3.3%
1910	8,512		−4.5%
1920	6,945		−18.4%
1930	6,147		−11.5%
1940	6,807		10.7%
1950	6,009		−11.7%
1960	5,330		−11.3%
1970	7,080		32.8%
1980	7,742		9.4%
1990	7,864		1.6%
2000	8,392		6.7%
2010	8,565		2.1%
2020	9,095		6.2%
2025 (est.)	9,050	▼	−0.5%
U.S. Decennial Census; 1790-1960 1900-1990; 1990-2000 2010-2021

=== 2020 census ===
As of the 2020 census, the county had a population of 9,095. The median age was 41.5 years. 23.8% of residents were under the age of 18 and 18.7% of residents were 65 years of age or older. For every 100 females there were 103.7 males, and for every 100 females age 18 and over there were 100.1 males age 18 and over.

The racial makeup of the county was 94.8% White, 0.9% Black or African American, 0.0% American Indian and Alaska Native, 0.4% Asian, 0.0% Native Hawaiian and Pacific Islander, 0.7% from some other race, and 3.1% from two or more races. Hispanic or Latino residents of any race comprised 1.8% of the population.

8.6% of residents lived in urban areas, while 91.4% lived in rural areas.

There were 3,531 households in the county, of which 31.7% had children under the age of 18 living with them and 22.2% had a female householder with no spouse or partner present. About 24.1% of all households were made up of individuals and 10.7% had someone living alone who was 65 years of age or older.

There were 3,894 housing units, of which 9.3% were vacant. Among occupied housing units, 77.4% were owner-occupied and 22.6% were renter-occupied. The homeowner vacancy rate was 1.3% and the rental vacancy rate was 9.4%.

=== 2000 census ===
As of the census of 2000, there were 8,392 people, 3,215 households, and 2,436 families residing in the county. The population density was 44 per square mile (17/km^{2}). There were 3,600 housing units at an average density of 19 per square mile (7.3/km^{2}). The racial makeup of the county was 97.97% White, 0.85% Black or African American, 0.29% Native American, 0.17% Asian, 0.17% from other races, and 0.56% from two or more races. 0.76% of the population were Hispanic or Latino of any race.

There were 3,215 households, out of which 36.40% had children under the age of 18 living with them, 64.40% were married couples living together, 8.30% had a female householder with no husband present, and 24.20% were non-families. 21.20% of all households were made up of individuals, and 8.90% had someone living alone who was 65 years of age or older. The average household size was 2.59 and the average family size was 3.01.

In the county, the population was spread out, with 26.70% under the age of 18, 8.50% from 18 to 24, 29.00% from 25 to 44, 24.90% from 45 to 64, and 11.00% who were 65 years of age or older. The median age was 36 years. For every 100 females, there were 97.50 males. For every 100 females age 18 and over, there were 95.80 males.

The median income for a household in the county was $36,914, and the median income for a family was $42,994. Males had a median income of $35,294 versus $23,574 for females. The per capita income for the county was $16,623. About 11.40% of families and 13.60% of the population were below the poverty line, including 18.00% of those under age 18 and 15.80% of those age 65 or over.

== Economy ==
A massive Artificial intelligence (AI), multi-billion dollar data center development is underway in Hawesville.

== Communities ==
=== Incorporated ===
- Hawesville (county seat)
- Lewisport (largest community)

=== Unincorporated ===
- Adair
- Arrington Corner
- Boling Chapel
- Cabot
- Chambers
- Dukes
- Easton
- Floral
- Goering
- Patesville
- Pellville
- Petri
- Roseville
- Reynolds Station (mostly in Ohio County)
- Skillman
- Utility
- Waitman
- Weberstown

== Politics ==
United States presidential election results for Hancock County, Kentucky
Year	Republican		Democratic		Third party(ies)	
Year	No.	%	No.	%	No.	%
1912	268	15.23%	757	43.01%	735	41.76%
1916	918	51.14%	833	46.41%	44	2.45%
1920	1,446	50.23%	1,384	48.07%	49	1.70%
1924	1,332	48.88%	1,323	48.55%	70	2.57%
1928	1,614	58.33%	1,151	41.60%	2	0.07%
1932	1,174	41.54%	1,623	57.43%	29	1.03%
1936	1,087	44.90%	1,317	54.40%	17	0.70%
1940	1,424	51.52%	1,338	48.41%	2	0.07%
1944	1,365	54.40%	1,129	45.00%	15	0.60%
1948	985	45.54%	1,146	52.98%	32	1.48%
1952	1,341	53.11%	1,177	46.61%	7	0.28%
1956	1,317	56.14%	1,022	43.56%	7	0.30%
1960	1,488	59.38%	1,018	40.62%	0	0.00%
1964	756	34.52%	1,423	64.98%	11	0.50%
1968	1,049	44.70%	867	36.94%	431	18.36%
1972	1,583	64.61%	791	32.29%	76	3.10%
1976	1,124	40.92%	1,562	56.86%	61	2.22%
1980	1,367	45.51%	1,530	50.93%	107	3.56%
1984	1,967	59.59%	1,287	38.99%	47	1.42%
1988	1,733	53.44%	1,478	45.58%	32	0.99%
1992	1,261	34.98%	1,714	47.55%	630	17.48%
1996	1,356	40.61%	1,547	46.33%	436	13.06%
2000	2,032	56.29%	1,508	41.77%	70	1.94%
2004	2,286	56.74%	1,709	42.42%	34	0.84%
2008	1,928	46.53%	2,135	51.52%	81	1.95%
2012	2,212	53.51%	1,833	44.34%	89	2.15%
2016	2,788	64.91%	1,244	28.96%	263	6.12%
2020	3,145	68.56%	1,351	29.45%	91	1.98%
2024	3,375	72.85%	1,173	25.32%	85	1.83%

Unlike most fellow Southern counties, Hancock County has been a swing county for most of its history. No party had won the county more than three times in a row (aside from a brief Republican streak from 1916 to 1928), but the county has swung sharply to the right in the 21st century. The county gave Barack Obama a majority of the votes in 2008, but went back to Republican hands in 2012, and has continued to swing further right since, with Donald Trump becoming the first candidate in history to gain over 70% of the vote in 2024. Hancock County is still relatively swingy socially, having voted in favor of abortion and legalizing medical marijuana. Like most counties in Kentucky, Hancock County is much more competitive at the local level due to Kentucky's high number of conservative Democrats and Kentucky's previously Democratic history.

=== Government ===
==== Federal and State ====
Elected officials as of January 3, 2025
U.S. House	Brett Guthrie (R)	KY 2
Ky. Senate	Gary Boswell (R)	8
Ky. House	Scott Lewis (R)	14

==== Fiscal Court ====
Office	Name	Party
Magistrate District 1	Brent Wigginton	Republican
Magistrate District 2	Kasey Emmick	Democratic
Magistrate District 3	John Gray	Republican
Magistrate District 4	Gary Baker	Republican

==== County Office ====
Office	Name	Party
Judge/Executive	Johnny Roberts Jr.	Republican
County Attorney	Paul Madden Jr.	Democratic
Sheriff	Dale Bozarth	Democratic
Jailer	Roger Estes	Democratic
Circuit Court Clerk	Mike Boling	Democratic
County Clerk	Trina Ogle	Democratic
Property Value Administrator	Karen Keown	Republican
Coroner	David Gibson	Republican
