= First Hancock County Courthouse =

- U.S. National Register of Historic Places
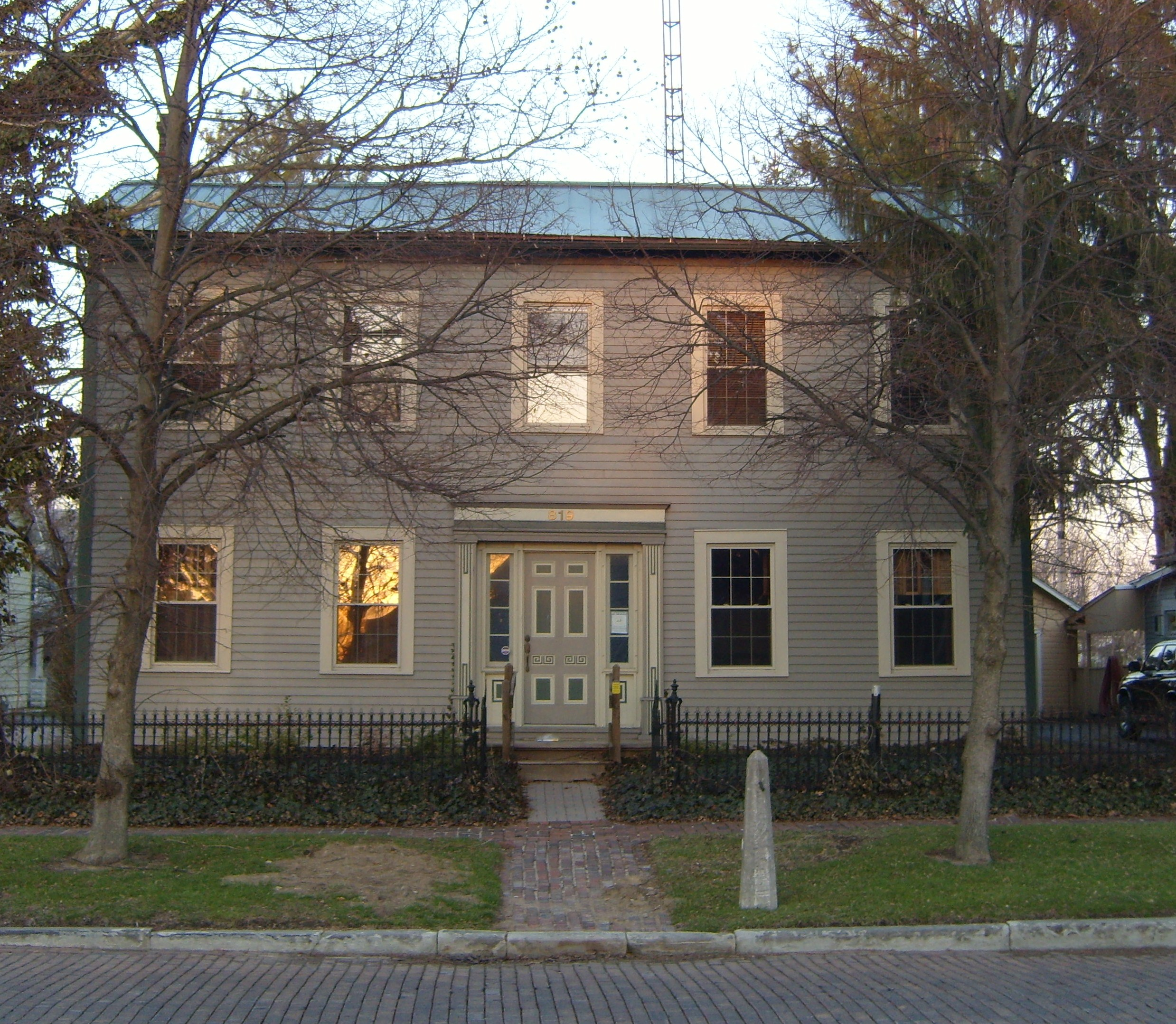
- Front of the courthouse

- Location within Ohio Location within the United States
- Location: 819 Park St., Findlay, Ohio
- Coordinates: 41°1′56″N 83°38′37″W
- Area: Less than one acre
- Built: 1833
- Architect: William Taylor, Frederick Henderson, Jonathan Parker, and Parlee Carlin
- NRHP reference No.: 76001454
- Added to NRHP: March 13, 1976

The First Hancock County Courthouse is a historic courthouse in Findlay, Ohio, United States. It was built in 1833 and listed on the National Register of Historic Places in 1976.

== History ==
The First Hancock County Courthouse was originally erected in Findlay upon the southwest corner of Main and Putnam (Crawford) Streets. The contract to build the courthouse was awarded to Wilson Vance, Frederick Henderson, and Jonathion Parker in January 1832 for the sum of $700. Following construction, it was plastered by Parlee Carlin in the autumn of 1833. It was used until a second, more permanent courthouse was completed in 1842 on the southwest corner of Main and West Cross (the precursor to Findlay's current courthouse). In addition to being an early courthouse, it also was utilized as both a schoolhouse and a church. After the building of a more permanent courthouse, the First Hancock County Courthouse was sold and moved to various locations throughout the city where it became a variety of hotels. It currently rests at 819 Park Street in Findlay. During Hancock County's natural gas boom in the late nineteenth century, many property owners in the city modified their houses by the installation of natural gas central heating and lighting, but few buildings had previously experienced the benefits of natural gas. One of the few exceptions was the old courthouse — it was the first house in the city to have natural gas installed.

== Architecture ==
The building, as planned in December 1831, was designed to be a temporary structure for the county offices and court system. It was designed as a two-story building measuring 24 by 26 feet; it is a simple frame structure of no particular architectural style. With the exception of the main entrance, the building's elements are purely functional: its shape is simply rectangular with no ornamental details, except for a decorative transom and sidelights framing the main entrance.

== Heritage designation ==
The First Hancock County Courthouse was listed on the National Register of Historic Places in 1976. It was the third building in Hancock County to be listed on the Register, following the Jasper G. Hull House and the current courthouse.
