= Hancock County Courthouse (Ohio) =

Local government building in the United States

- U.S. National Register of Historic Places
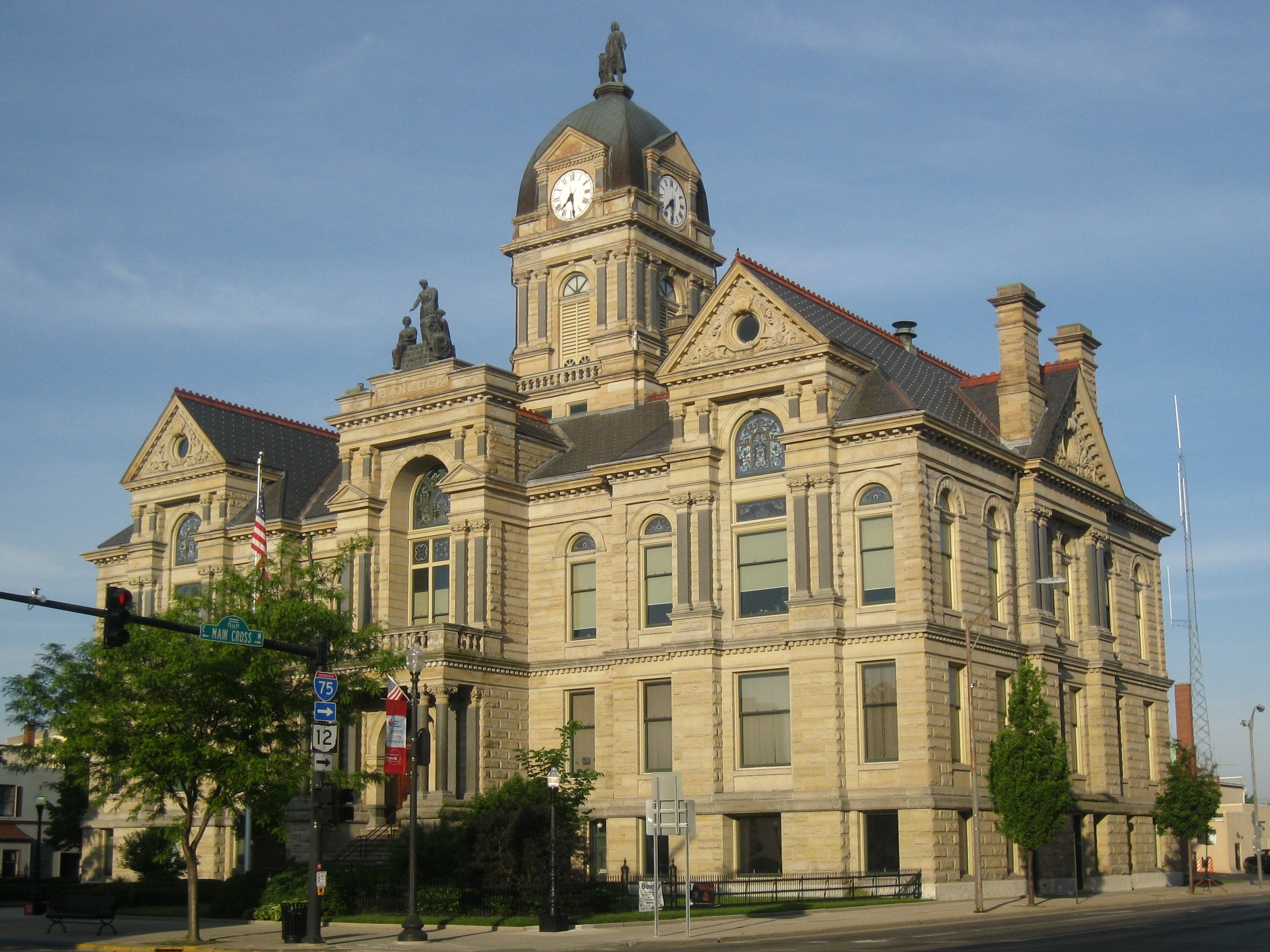
- Front of the courthouse

- Location within Ohio Location within the United States
- Interactive map showing the location of Hancock County Courthouse
- Location: Courthouse Sq., Findlay, Ohio
- Coordinates: 41°2′20″N 83°39′2″W
- Area: 1.5 acres (0.61 ha)
- Built: 1886-1888
- Architect: Weary & Kramer
- Architectural style: Palladium, Victorian, and Richardson Romanesque
- NRHP reference No.: 73001475
- Added to NRHP: May 7, 1973

The Hancock County Courthouse is a historic courthouse in Findlay, Ohio, United States. Built between 1886 and 1888, it was listed on the National Register of Historic Places in 1973.

== Early history ==
The building, as planned in 1885, was to replace a previous brick courthouse located at the same site. When oil and natural gas were discovered in Hancock County shortly thereafter, the Courthouse was given many of its unique and eclectic stylings. On April 17, 1885 the Ohio Legislature authorized the construction of a new courthouse for Hancock County, raising $100,000 in bonds. The cornerstone was laid on August 11, 1886. W.H. Campfield won the initial bid to construct the courthouse enclosure and that was completed by November 1886. Campfield again won the bid for the completion of the project. Amidst delays the project soared from an estimate of $121,890.25 to $305,272.53 (although after refunds on the bonds and interest this blossomed to more than $511,010).

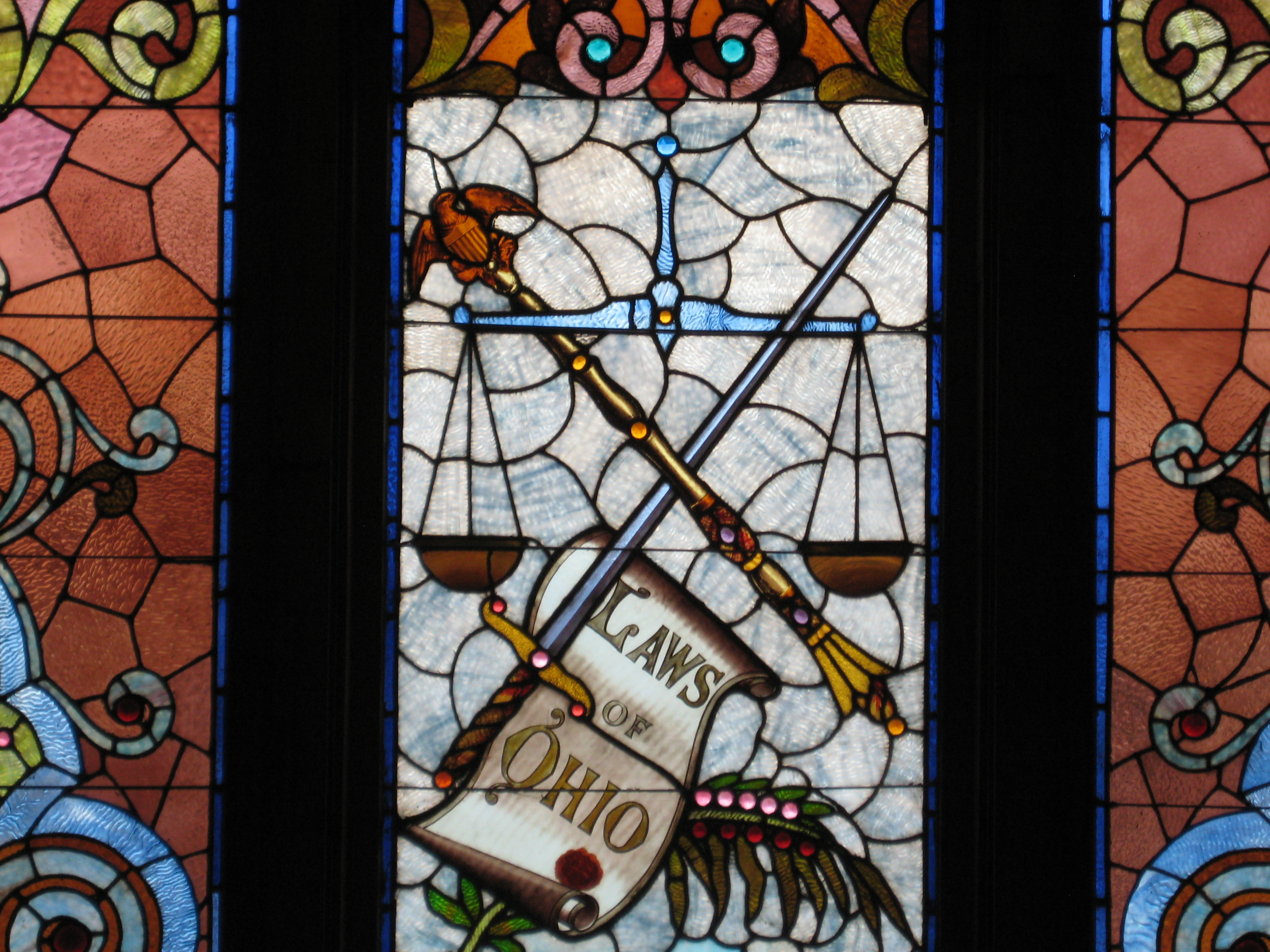
Typical stained glass window in the courthouse.

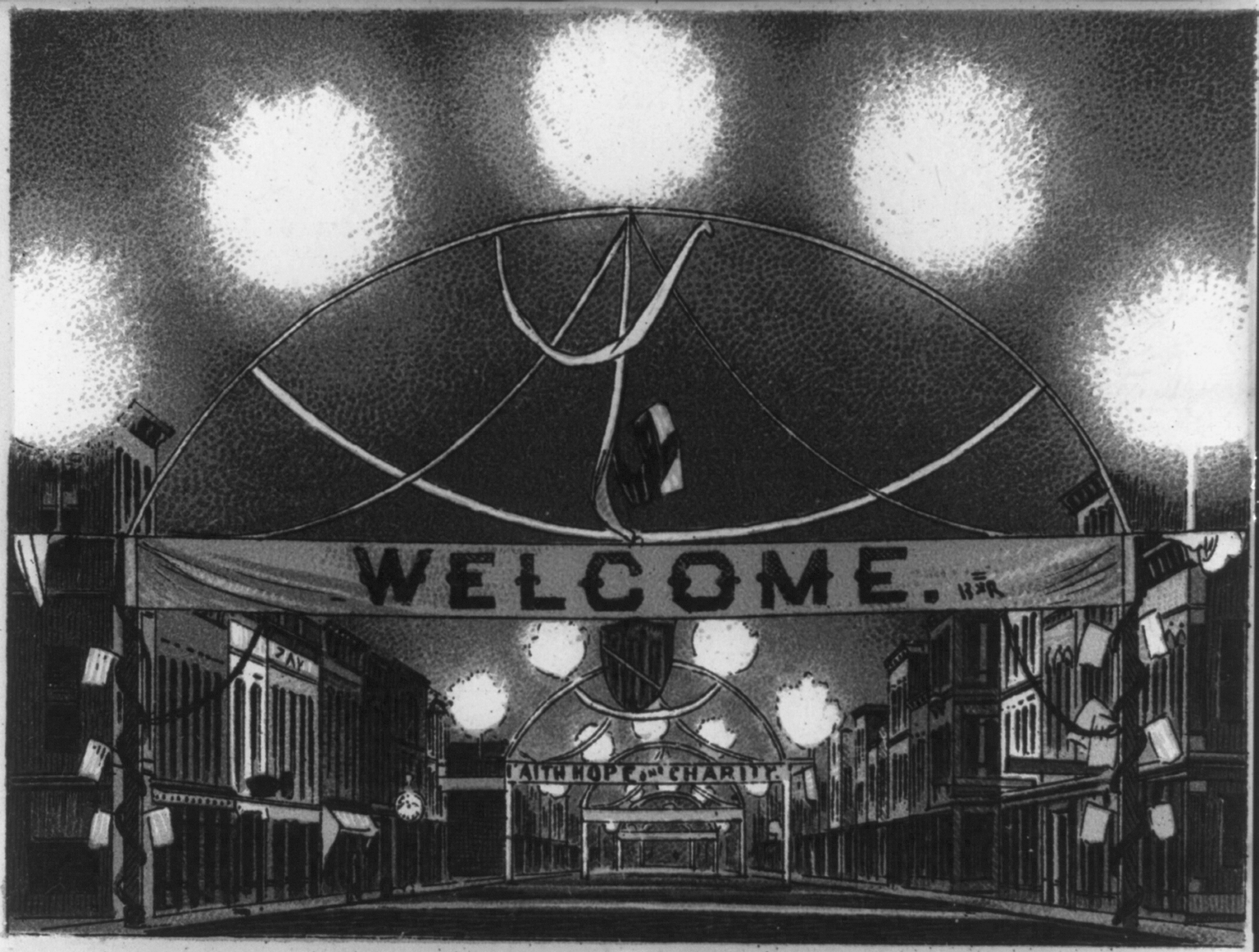
Celebration on Main Street during the laying of the cornerstone at the new courthouse.

On May 30, 1913 the bathtub of Captain Charles Dwight Sigsbee recovered from the shipwreck of the USS Maine was publicly displayed for the first time at the Hancock County Courthouse.

== Architecture ==
The building measures 82 feet by 142 feet and is 139.5 feet tall from the sidewalk to the top of the county's namesake and Founding Father John Hancock. The Hancock statue is made of copper and stands next to a pedestal with a law book upon the clock tower. It stands approximately 18 feet tall. In September 1922, during a severe storm the statue was blown off the courthouse and extensively damaged. It was repaired the following year. Below John Hancock sit the three feminine figures, Law, Justice, and Mercy, also made out of copper. The clock tower itself has four faces pointing towards each cardinal direction. Each face measures between 8 and 9 feet in diameter. Originally these clocks had a pendulum, 3000 lb bell, and were hand wound until 1925 when they were electrified. The clock faces and inner works were constructed by the E. Howard & Co.

== Renovation ==
During the 1990s the courthouse underwent an extensive $3 million restoration. The brass railings to both the second and third floors are original to the structure, as well as the brass medallions below the bannisters. Also the ornately tiled floors, floral motif stained glass, and the imposing early Victorian woodwork is original.

== Services ==
It currently houses the Hancock County Common Pleas Court, Clerk of Courts, Law Library, Recorder's, Auditor's, and Treasurer's offices.
