= Lewisport, Kentucky =

- City
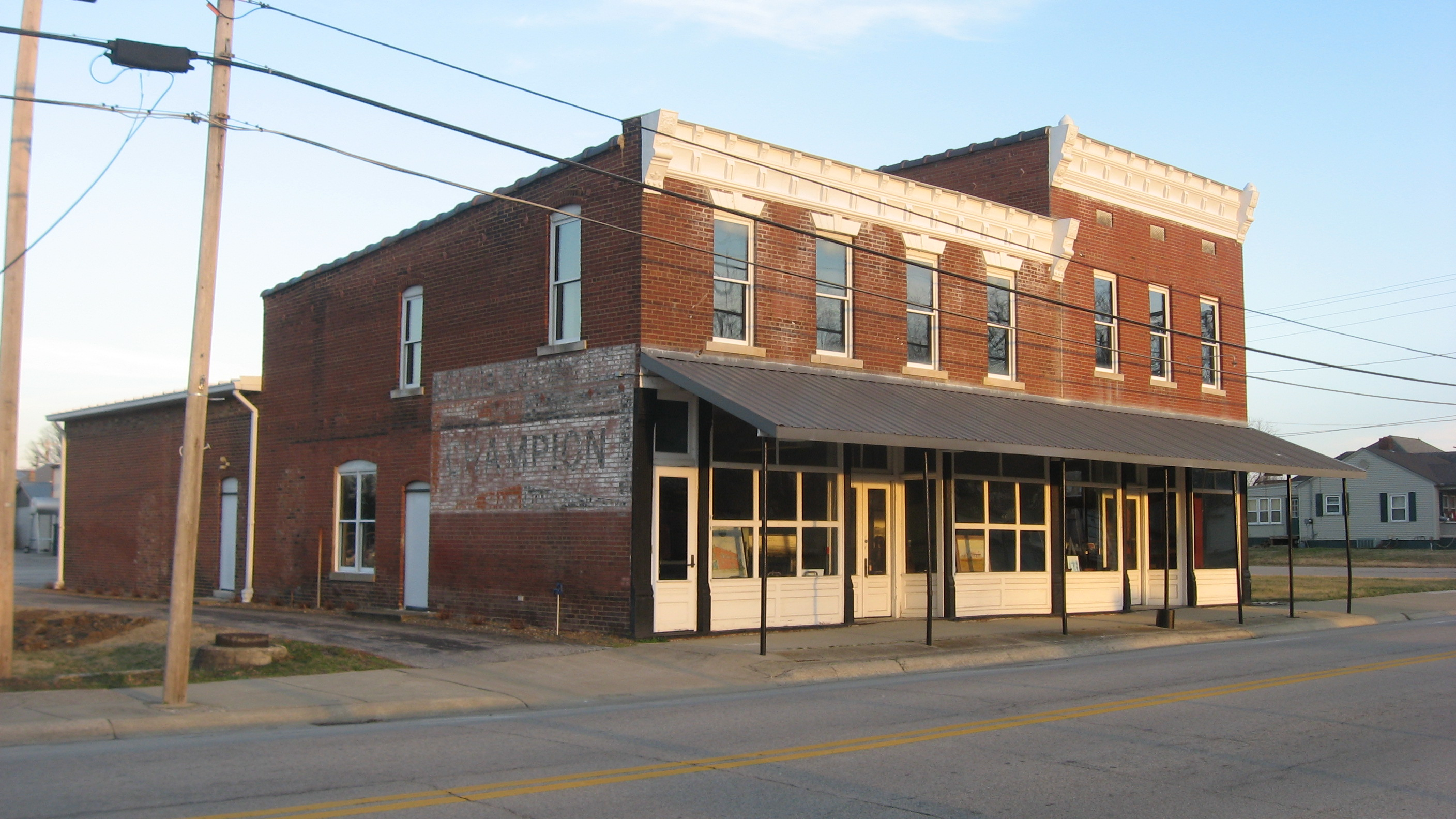
- Historic buildings in Lewisport

- Location of Lewisport in Hancock County, Kentucky.
- Coordinates: 37°56′6″N 86°54′19″W
- Country: United States
- State: Kentucky
- County: Hancock
- Incorporated: 1844
- Reïncorporated: 1882
- Named after: a local landowner

Government
  - Mayor: Chad Gregory

Area
  - Total: 0.97 sq mi (2.51 km^{2})
  - Land: 0.95 sq mi (2.47 km^{2})
  - Water: 0.015 sq mi (0.04 km^{2})
- Elevation: 397 ft (121 m)

Population (2020)
  - Total: 1,767
  - Estimate (2022): 1,754
  - Density: 1,854.9/sq mi (716.19/km^{2})
- Time zone: UTC-6 (Central (CST))
  - Summer (DST): UTC-5 (CDT)
- ZIP code: 42351
- Area codes: 270 & 364
- FIPS code: 21-45136
- GNIS feature ID: 0496341
- Website: www.lewisport.cityof.org

Lewisport is a home rule-class city in the floodplain of the Ohio River in Hancock County, Kentucky, in the United States. As of the 2020 census, Lewisport had a population of 1,767. It is also the most populous community in the county. It is included in the Owensboro metropolitan area.

== History ==
Lewisport was originally a ferry landing site known as "Little Yellow Banks", in allusion to Owensboro's original name of "Yellow Banks". The first settler was James Prentis, who platted the current town in 1837 with his brother John. An attempt to rename the city "Prentisport" failed, though, when James insisted the town be named after his friend Dr. John Lewis instead. The town was chartered as "Lewisport" in 1839, and the post office was established under that name in 1844. The city was formally incorporated by the state assembly the same year, but needed to be reincorporated in 1882.

Logging and flatboat construction were the initial chief industries. The river has flooded the city repeatedly, and the importance of lumber construction and industry has sparked several major fires.

Abraham Lincoln won his first case – Commonwealth of Kentucky v. Abraham Lincoln – in Lewisport's Pate House, at the time the site of the local circuit court. He was tried in the east room of the log house before Squire Pate for operating a ferry across the Ohio River without a license, but the justice of the peace dismissed the case against him. The house is now a county landmark and is open for tours throughout the year.

During the Civil War, Bill Davison and Isaac Coulter captured and robbed the steamship Morning Star here on December 23, 1864, killing three Union soldiers. The town's only bank was shuttered during the Great Depression. Upon its founding in 1938, the Lewisport School System comprised eight local one-room schools; today it is part of the Hancock County Consolidated School System.

== Geography ==
Lewisport is located in northwestern Hancock County at 37°56′6″N 86°54′19″W (37.935023, -86.905270), on the south bank of the Ohio River. The closest river crossings are 10 miles (16 km) by road to the east, at Hawesville, and the same distance to the west, at U.S. Route 231 near Rockport, Indiana. U.S. Route 60 passes east–west through the southern end of Lewisport. According to the United States Census Bureau, the city has a total area of 1.0 square mile (2.5 km^{2}), all land.

== Demographics ==
Historical population
Census	Pop.	Note	%±
1870	308		—
1880	362		17.5%
1890	435		20.2%
1900	328		−24.6%
1910	596		81.7%
1920	572		−4.0%
1930	574		0.3%
1940	591		3.0%
1950	656		11.0%
1960	610		−7.0%
1970	1,595		161.5%
1980	1,832		14.9%
1990	1,778		−2.9%
2000	1,639		−7.8%
2010	1,670		1.9%
2020	1,767		5.8%
2022 (est.)	1,754		−0.7%
U.S. Decennial Census

=== 2020 census ===
As of the 2020 census, Lewisport had a population of 1,767. The median age was 39.4 years. 24.4% of residents were under the age of 18 and 21.2% of residents were 65 years of age or older. For every 100 females there were 93.1 males, and for every 100 females age 18 and over there were 89.4 males age 18 and over.

0.0% of residents lived in urban areas, while 100.0% lived in rural areas.

There were 731 households in Lewisport, of which 31.9% had children under the age of 18 living in them. Of all households, 40.4% were married-couple households, 19.0% were households with a male householder and no spouse or partner present, and 31.9% were households with a female householder and no spouse or partner present. About 30.5% of all households were made up of individuals and 12.6% had someone living alone who was 65 years of age or older.

There were 795 housing units, of which 8.1% were vacant. The homeowner vacancy rate was 0.6% and the rental vacancy rate was 9.2%.

Racial composition as of the 2020 census
Race	Number	Percent
White	1,629	92.2%
Black or African American	49	2.8%
American Indian and Alaska Native	3	0.2%
Asian	9	0.5%
Native Hawaiian and Other Pacific Islander	0	0.0%
Some other race	17	1.0%
Two or more races	60	3.4%
Hispanic or Latino (of any race)	50	2.8%

=== 2000 census ===
As of the 2000 census, there were 1,639 people, 648 households, and 452 families residing in the city. The population density was 1,540.8 inhabitants per square mile (594.9/km^{2}). There were 748 housing units at an average density of 703.2 per square mile (271.5/km^{2}). The racial makeup of the city was 96.40% White, 1.89% African American, 0.37% Native American, 0.61% Asian, 0.24% from other races, and 0.49% from two or more races. Hispanic or Latino of any race were 1.65% of the population.

There were 648 households, out of which 35.2% had children under the age of 18 living with them, 53.4% were married couples living together, 12.5% had a female householder with no husband present, and 30.2% were non-families. 27.6% of all households were made up of individuals, and 11.4% had someone living alone who was 65 years of age or older. The average household size was 2.43 and the average family size was 2.98.

In the city, the population was spread out, with 25.8% under the age of 18, 10.2% from 18 to 24, 27.4% from 25 to 44, 21.2% from 45 to 64, and 15.4% who were 65 years of age or older. The median age was 35 years. For every 100 females, there were 88.2 males. For every 100 females age 18 and over, there were 84.5 males.

The median income for a household in the city was $35,774, and the median income for a family was $42,321. Males had a median income of $39,318 versus $21,705 for females. The per capita income for the city was $16,413. About 15.6% of families and 17.0% of the population were below the poverty line, including 24.7% of those under age 18 and 16.6% of those age 65 or over.

== Education ==
Lewisport has a lending library, a branch of the Hancock County Public Library. It was home to Lewisport Elementary School, later replaced by North Hancock Elementary School in 2006.

== See also ==
- List of cities and towns along the Ohio River
