= Hawesville, Kentucky =

- City
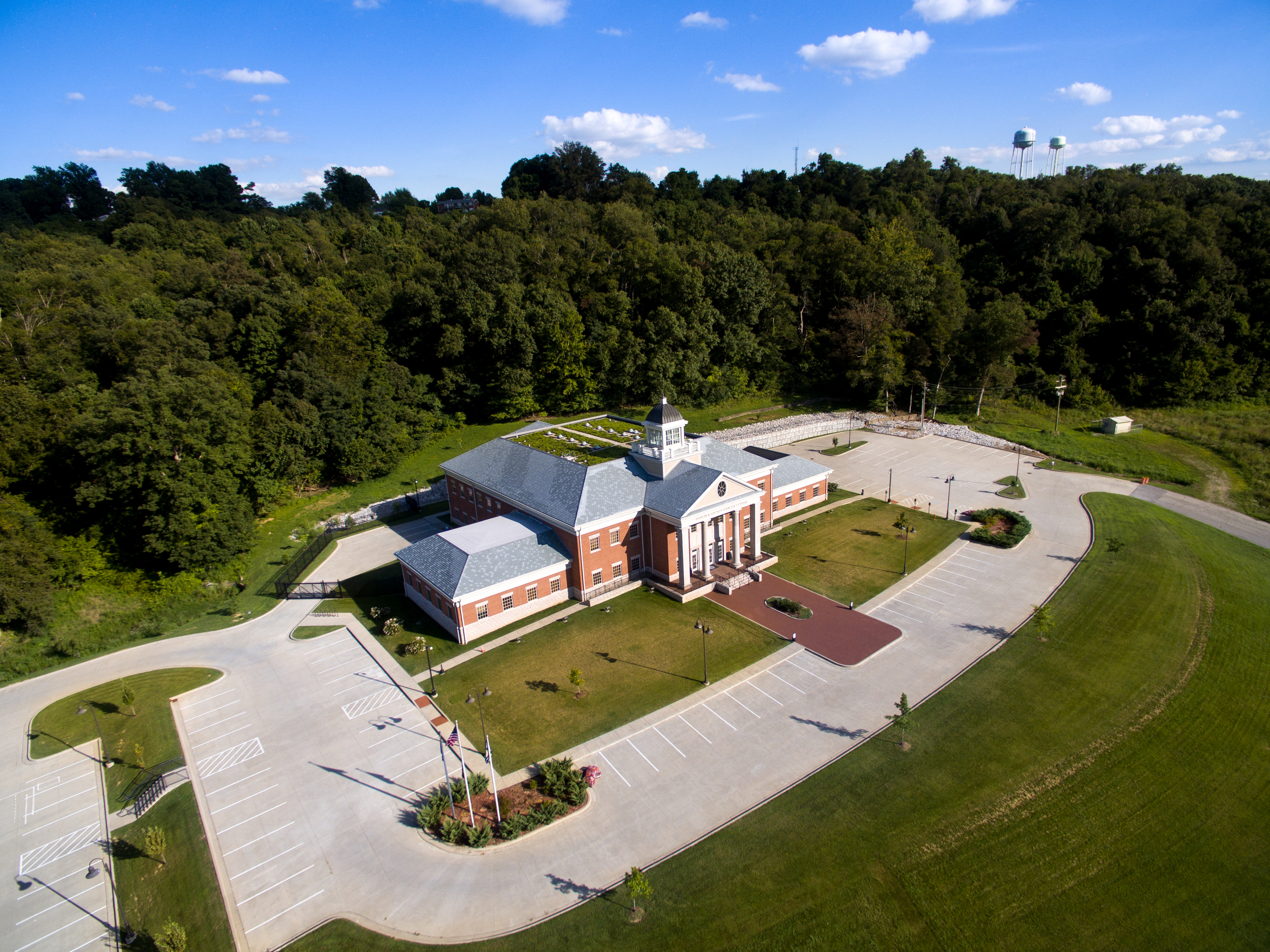
- Hancock County courthouse in Hawesville

- Flag Seal

- Location of Hawesville in Hancock County, Kentucky.
- Coordinates: 37°54′4″N 86°44′58″W
- Country: United States
- State: Kentucky
- County: Hancock
- Established: 1836
- Incorporated: 1847
- Named after: Richard Hawes Sr. (land donor)

Government
  - Mayor: Rob McCormick

Area
  - Total: 1.63 sq mi (4.22 km^{2})
  - Land: 1.62 sq mi (4.20 km^{2})
  - Water: 0.0039 sq mi (0.01 km^{2})
- Elevation: 518 ft (158 m)

Population (2020)
  - Total: 1,023
  - Density: 630/sq mi (243.3/km^{2})
- Time zone: UTC-6 (Central (CST))
  - Summer (DST): UTC-5 (CDT)
- ZIP code: 42348
- Area codes: 270 & 364
- FIPS code: 21-35200
- GNIS feature ID: 0493884
- Website: www.hawesville.us

Hawesville is a home rule-class city on the south bank of the Ohio River in Hancock County, Kentucky, in the United States. It is the seat of its county. As of the 2020 census, Hawesville had a population of 1,023. It is included in the Owensboro metropolitan area.

== Geography ==
Hawesville is located in northern Hancock County at 37°53′56″N 86°45′20″W (37.898865, -86.755570), on the south bank of the Ohio River and on the hills that rise south of the river. The Lincoln Trail Bridge carries Kentucky Route 69 across the Ohio at Hawesville, connecting the city with Cannelton, Indiana. U.S. Route 60 passes through the southwest part of Hawesville, leading southeast 10 miles (16 km) to Cloverport and southwest 25 miles (40 km) to Owensboro.

According to the United States Census Bureau, Hawesville has a total area of 1.2 square miles (3.2 km^{2}), all land.

== History ==
Upon the establishment of Hancock County in 1829, local landowner Richard Hawes Sr. (father of Rep. Richard Hawes Jr.) donated land for a county seat, free to any homesteaders who settled there. The Hawesville post office was established later that year. The city was formally established in 1836 and incorporated by the state assembly in 1847.

Despite the Immaculate Conception Church's listing on the National Register of Historic Places, it was demolished and replaced with a modern structure.

== Economy ==
In 1969 an aluminum smelter was built in the area. As of 2024 Century Aluminum owns the smelter, which the company describes as the largest in North America, but it was idled in 2022, resulting in layoffs affecting 550 employees.

=== Justified Data Campus ===
In February 2026, TeraWulf Inc. announced it will purchase and redevelop the former Century Aluminum Company's smelter site, with more than 250 buildable acres, into a digital infrastructure campus supporting high-performance computing and artificial intelligence workloads. Century Aluminum will retain a non-controlling minority equity stake in the development.

In July 2026, TeraWulh announced Anthropic the California-based artificial intelligence company known for its Claude platform, signed a 20-year lease for a data center in development, in a campus called, Justified Data, in Hawesville, according to TeraWulf, the project owner. The data center will be developed in phases, scheduled to go online in the second half of 2027, with full operations targeted for 2028. The lease is expected to generate approximately $19 billion of contracted revenue over the initial lease term. The data center campus is currently estimated to cost between $3 and $4 billion. In August 2026, the Kentucky Public Service Commission approved a 482-megawatt power agreement for TeraWulf's Justified Data Campus.

== Demographics ==
Historical population
Census	Pop.	Note	%±
1860	1,128		—
1870	855		−24.2%
1880	872		2.0%
1890	1,013		16.2%
1900	1,041		2.8%
1910	1,002		−3.7%
1920	829		−17.3%
1930	790		−4.7%
1940	896		13.4%
1950	925		3.2%
1960	882		−4.6%
1970	1,262		43.1%
1980	1,036		−17.9%
1990	998		−3.7%
2000	971		−2.7%
2010	945		−2.7%
2020	1,023		8.3%
U.S. Decennial Census

As of the census of 2000, there were 971 people, 409 households, and 271 families residing in the city. The population density was 747.3 inhabitants per square mile (288.5/km^{2}). There were 441 housing units at an average density of 339.4 per square mile (131.0/km^{2}). The racial makeup of the city was 98.25% White, 1.44% African American, 0.10% Native American, and 0.21% from two or more races. Hispanic or Latino of any race were 0.21% of the population.

There were 409 households, out of which 34.7% had children under the age of 18 living with them, 51.3% were married couples living together, 12.2% had a female householder with no husband present, and 33.7% were non-families. 32.3% of all households were made up of individuals, and 17.4% had someone living alone who was 65 years of age or older. The average household size was 2.35 and the average family size was 2.98.

In the city, the population was spread out, with 26.6% under the age of 18, 8.4% from 18 to 24, 27.5% from 25 to 44, 22.0% from 45 to 64, and 15.4% who were 65 years of age or older. The median age was 36 years. For every 100 females, there were 88.5 males. For every 100 females age 18 and over, there were 83.3 males.

The median income for a household in the city was $33,929, and the median income for a family was $45,000. Males had a median income of $39,318 versus $22,750 for females. The per capita income for the city was $18,985. About 12.1% of families and 11.9% of the population were below the poverty line, including 12.6% of those under age 18 and 10.1% of those age 65 or over.

== Education ==
Hawesville has a lending library, a branch of the Hancock County Public Library.

== Notable people ==
- Ole 60, American country/alt-country band

== See also ==
- List of cities and towns along the Ohio River
