= Atlas (architecture) =

Architectural support sculpted in the form of a man

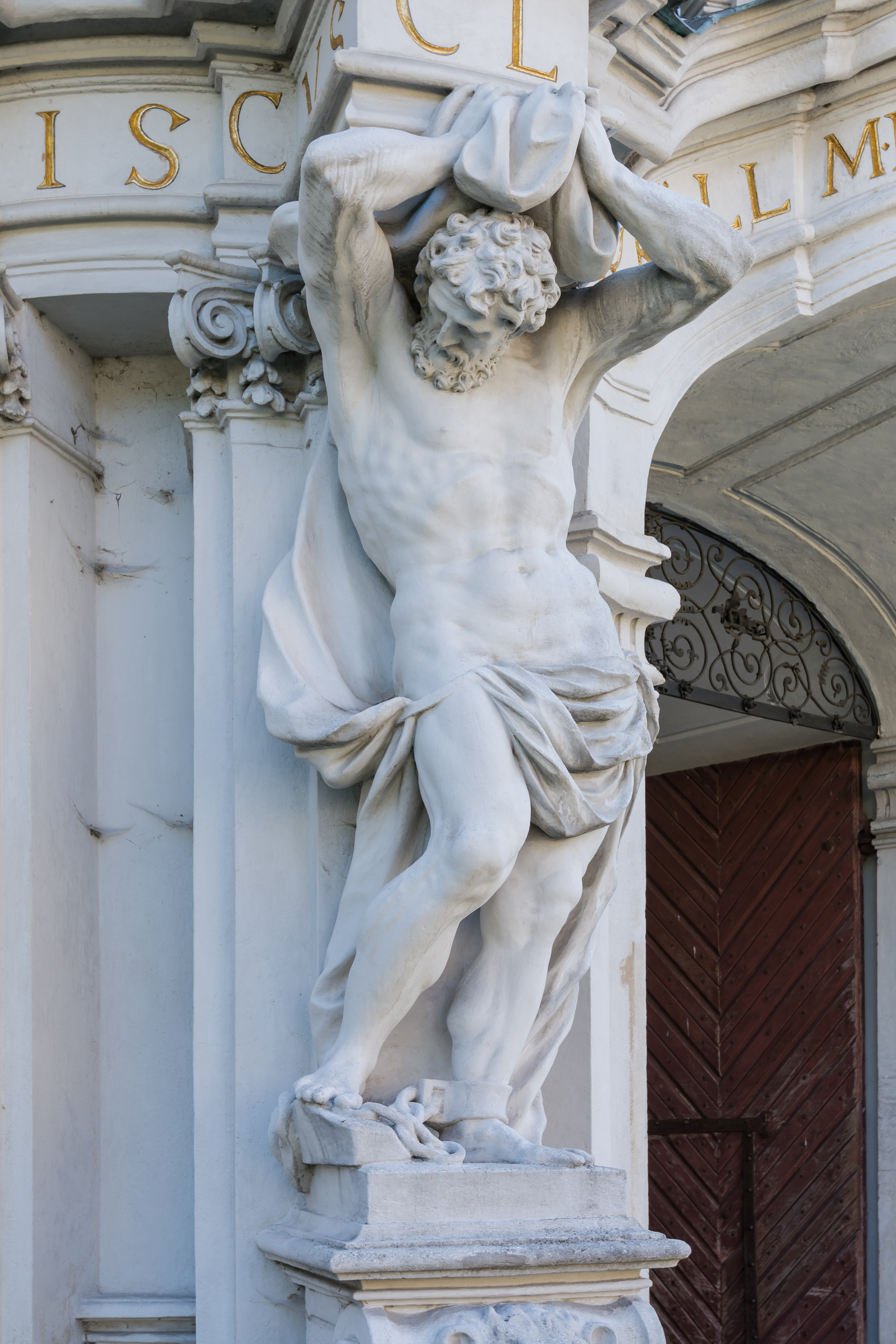
Baroque atlas at St. Florian Monastery, Austria, by Leonhard Sattler

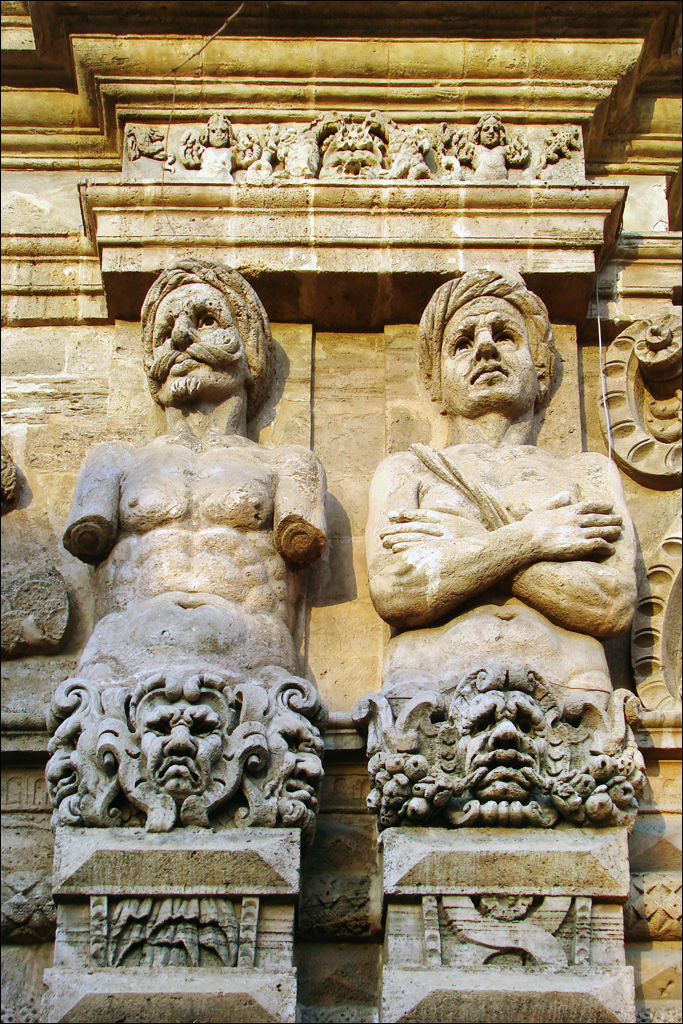
Atlantes depicting the Moors defeated by Charles V, Porta Nuova, Palermo

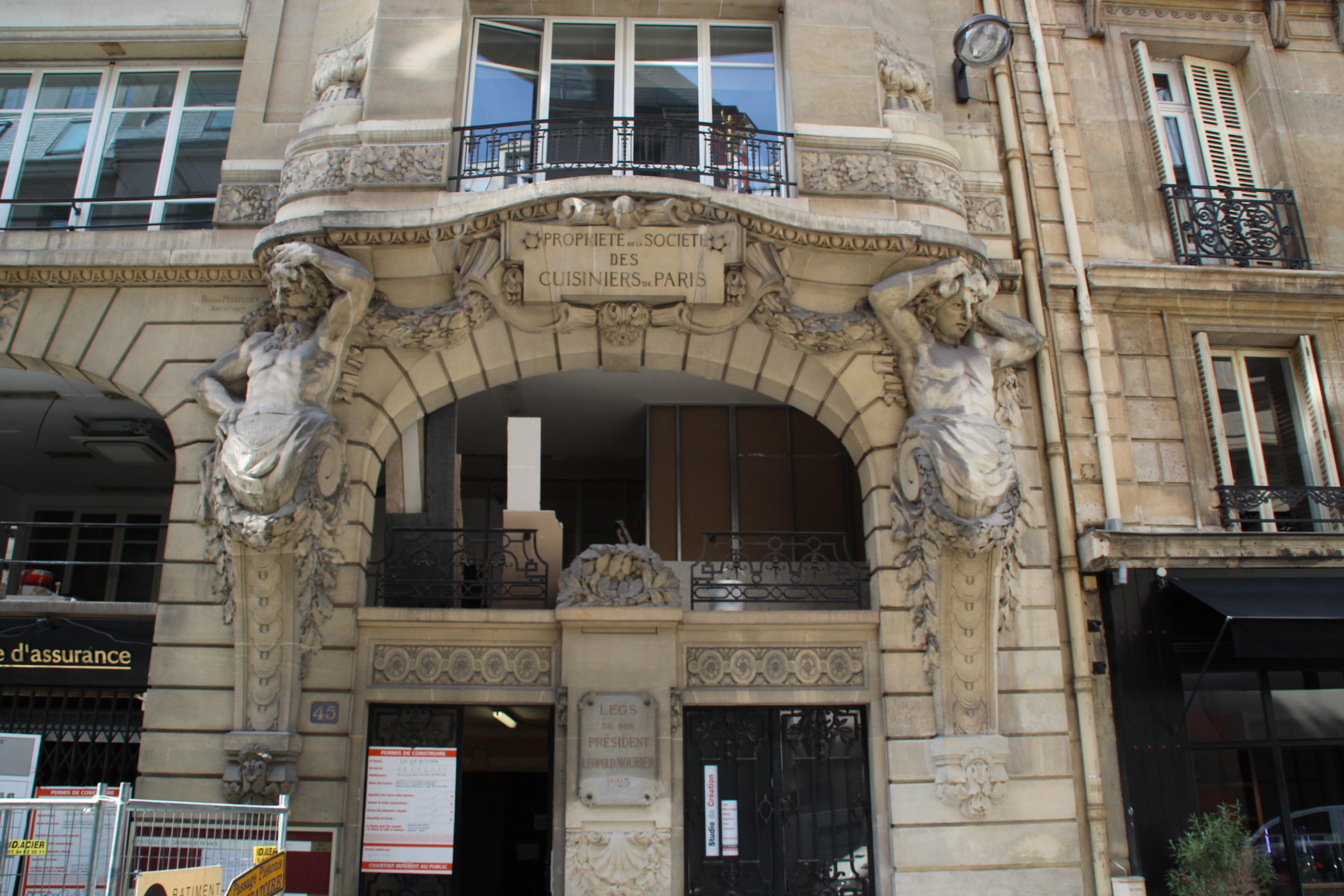
Beaux Arts atlantes on Rue Saint-Roch no. 45, Paris, by Bruno Pellissier, 1917

In European architectural sculpture, an atlas (also known as an atlant, or atlante or atlantid; plural atlantes) is a support sculpted in the form of a man, which may take the place of a column, a pier or a pilaster. Another Greek term for such a sculptural support is telamon (plural telamones or telamons).

The term atlantes is the Greek plural of the name Atlas—the Titan who was forced to hold the sky on his shoulders for eternity. The alternative term, telamones, also is derived from a later mythological hero, Telamon, one of the Argonauts, who was the father of Ajax.

The caryatid is the female precursor of this architectural form in Greece, a woman standing in the place of each column or pillar. Caryatids are found at the treasuries at Delphi and the Erechtheion on the Acropolis at Athens for Athene. They usually are in an Ionic context and represented a ritual association with the goddesses worshiped within. The Atlante is typically life-size or larger; smaller similar figures in the decorative arts are called terms. The body of many Atlantes turns into a rectangular pillar or other architectural feature around the waist level, a feature borrowed from the term. The pose and expression of Atlantes very often show their effort to bear the heavy load of the building, which is rarely the case with terms and caryatids. The herma or herm is a classical boundary marker or wayside monument to a god which is usually a square pillar with only a carved head on top, about life-size, and male genitals at the appropriate mid-point. Figures that are rightly called Atlantes may sometimes be described as herms.

Atlantes express extreme effort in their function, heads bent forward to support the weight of the structure above them across their shoulders, forearms often lifted to provide additional support, providing an architectural motif. Atlantes and caryatids were noted by the Roman late Republican architect Vitruvius, whose descriptions of the structures, rather than surviving examples, transmitted the idea of atlantes to the Renaissance architectural vocabulary.

== Origin ==
Not only did the Caryatids precede them, but similar architectural figures already had been made in ancient Egypt out of monoliths. Atlantes originated in Greek Sicily and in Magna Graecia, Southern Italy. The earliest surviving atlantes are fallen ones from the Early Classical Greek temple of Zeus, the Olympeion, in Agrigento, Sicily. Atlantes also played a significant role in Mannerist and Baroque architecture.

During the eighteenth and nineteenth centuries, the designs of many buildings featured glorious atlantes that looked much like Greek originals. Their inclusion in the final design for the portico of the Hermitage Museum in St. Petersburg that was built for Tsar Nicholas I of Russia in the 1840’s made the use of atlantes especially fashionable. The Hermitage portico incorporates ten enormous atlantes, approximately three times life-size, carved from Serdobol granite, which were designed by Johann Halbig and executed by the sculptor Alexander Terebenev.

== Mesoamerica ==
Similar carved stone columns or pillars in the shape of fierce men at some sites of Pre-Columbian Mesoamerica are typically called Atlantean figures. These figures are considered to be "massive statues of Toltec warriors".

== Examples ==
- Basilica di Santa Croce, Lecce, Italy
- Casa degli Omenoni, Milan, Italy
- Church of St. Georg, Hamburg, Germany
- Dům U Čtyř mamlasů, Brno, Czech Republic
- Hermitage Museum, St. Petersburg, Russia
- House in Kanałowa Str. 17, Poznań, Poland
- Palazzo Davia Bargellini, Bologna, Italy
- Pavilion Vendôme, Aix-en-Provence, France
- Porta Nuova, Palermo, Italy
- Sanssouci, Potsdam, Germany
- Sunshine Marketplace, Victoria, Australia
- Temple of Olympian Zeus, Valle dei Templi, Agrigento, Italy
- Tyszkiewicz Palace, Warsaw, Poland
- Zwinger Palace, Germany
- Wayne County Courthouse, Wooster, Ohio, United States

== Gallery ==
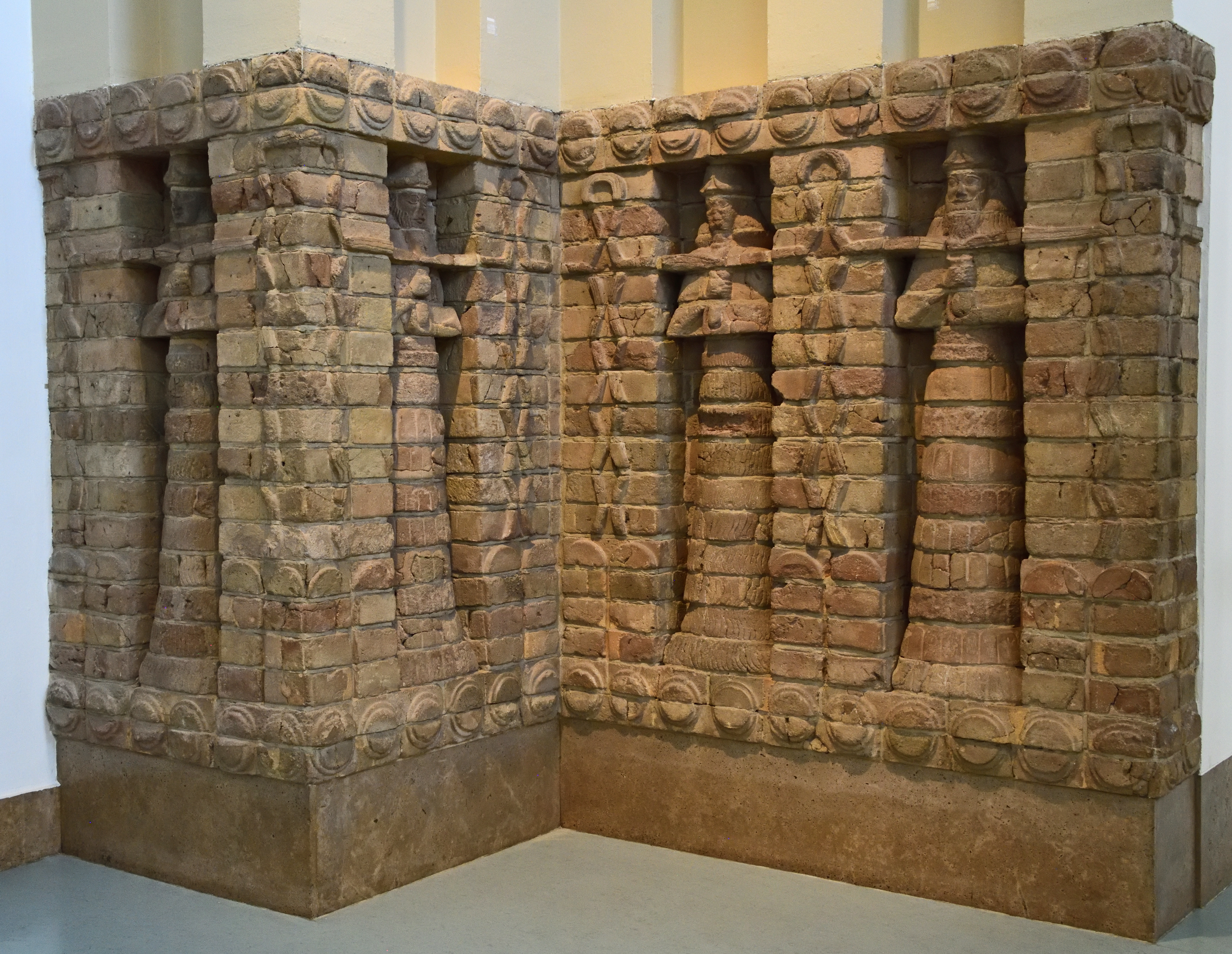
Sumerian façade of the Inanna Temple of Karaindash, Uruk, c.1413 BC, overall height: 211 cm, Vorderasiatisches Museum Berlin, Germany

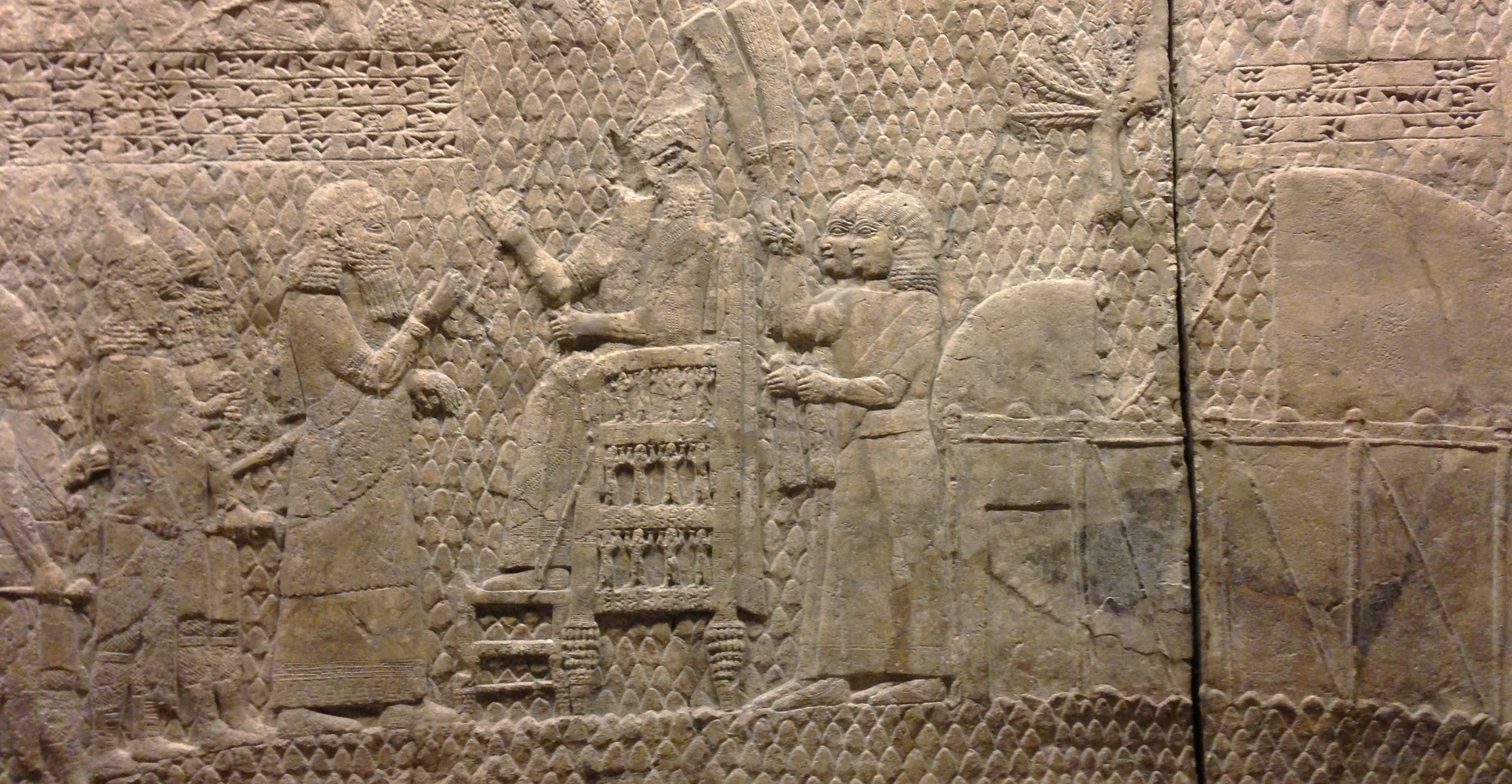
Assyrian relief with a throne with atlantes and Neo-Assyrian king Sennacherib sitting on it, 700-692 BC, gypsum, British Museum, London

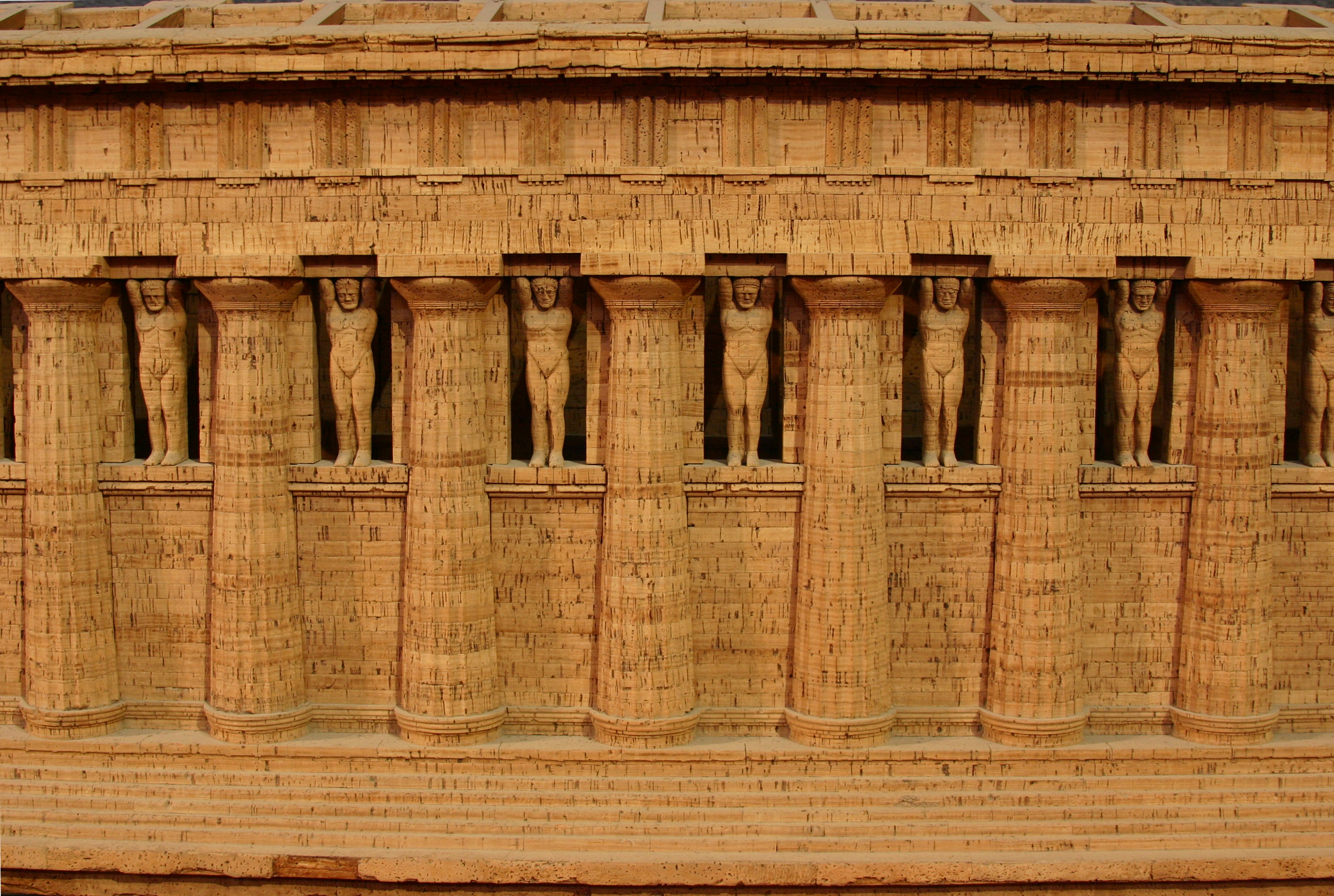
Model of Ancient Greek, Temple of Olympian Zeus, Agrigento, Sicily, original 5th century BC, Agrigento museum

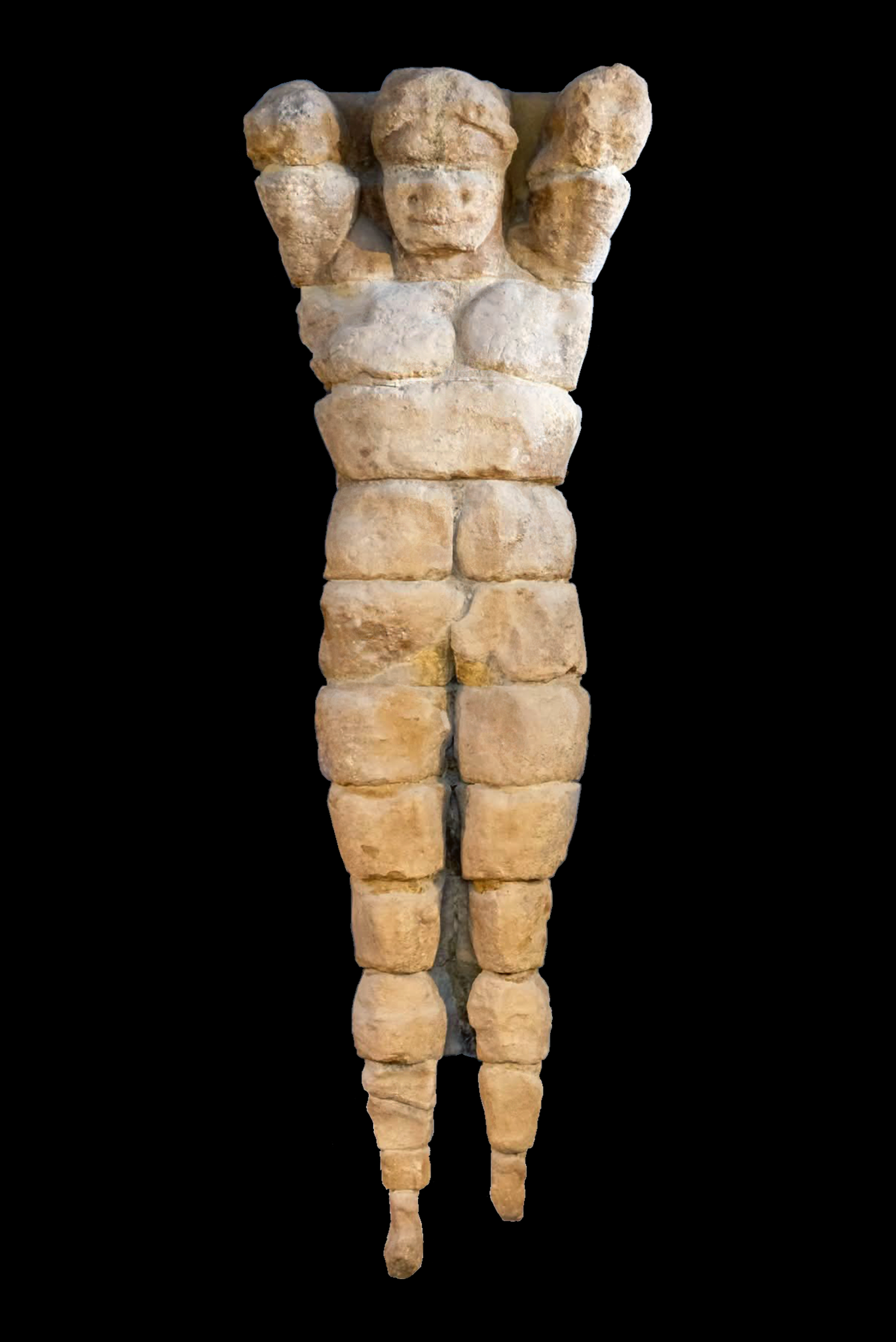
Ancient Greek atlas from the Temple of Olympian Zeus, Agrigento, 5th century BC, Agrigento Museum

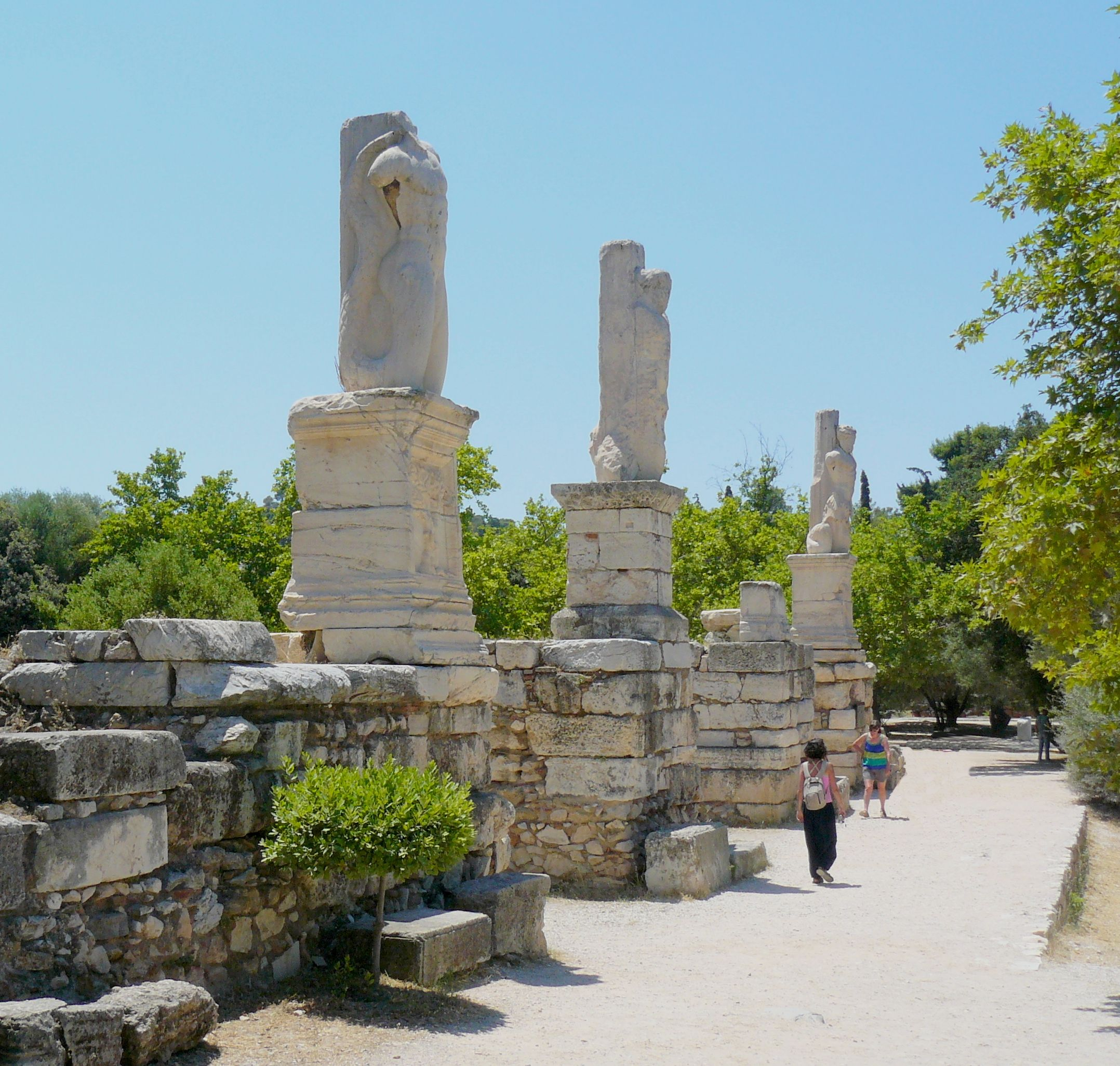
The remains of Triton-shaped atlantes from the Odeon of Agrippa, Athens, Greece

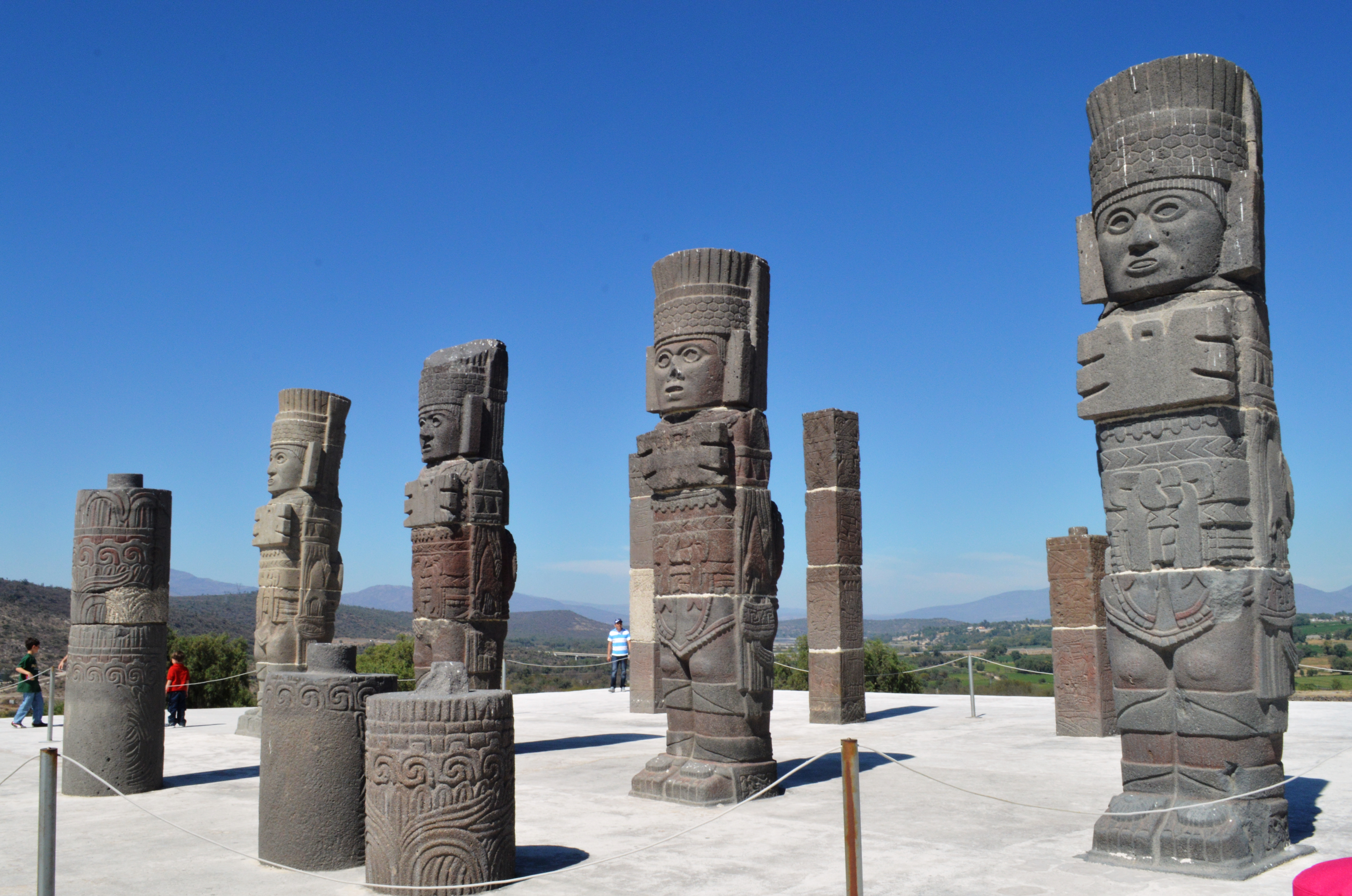
Colossal Toltec atlantes, Tula, Hidalgo, Mexico, c.900–1100 AD, approximate height: 4.88 m

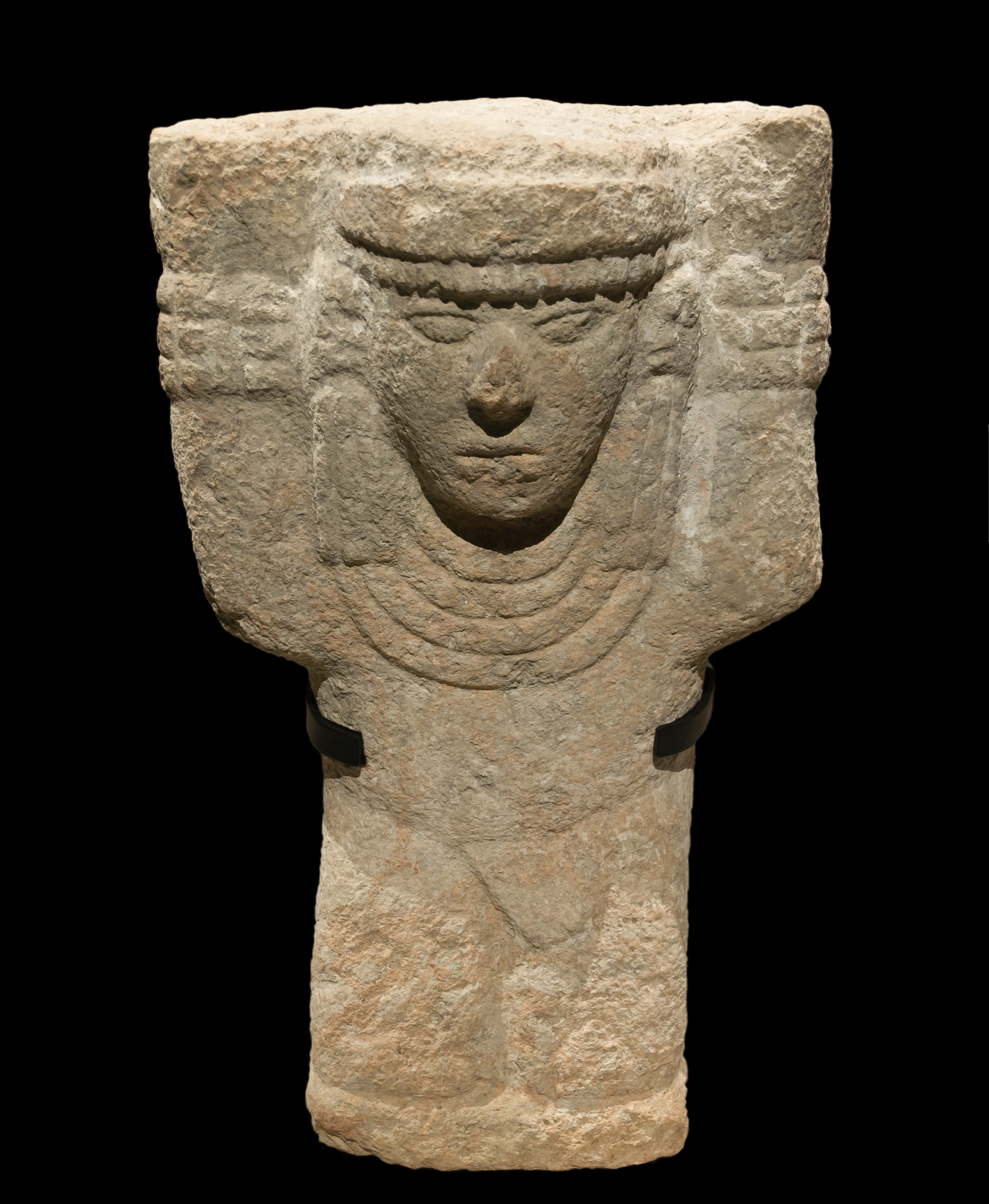
Maya kneeling atlas, 900-1250, limestone, Musée du Quai Branly, Paris

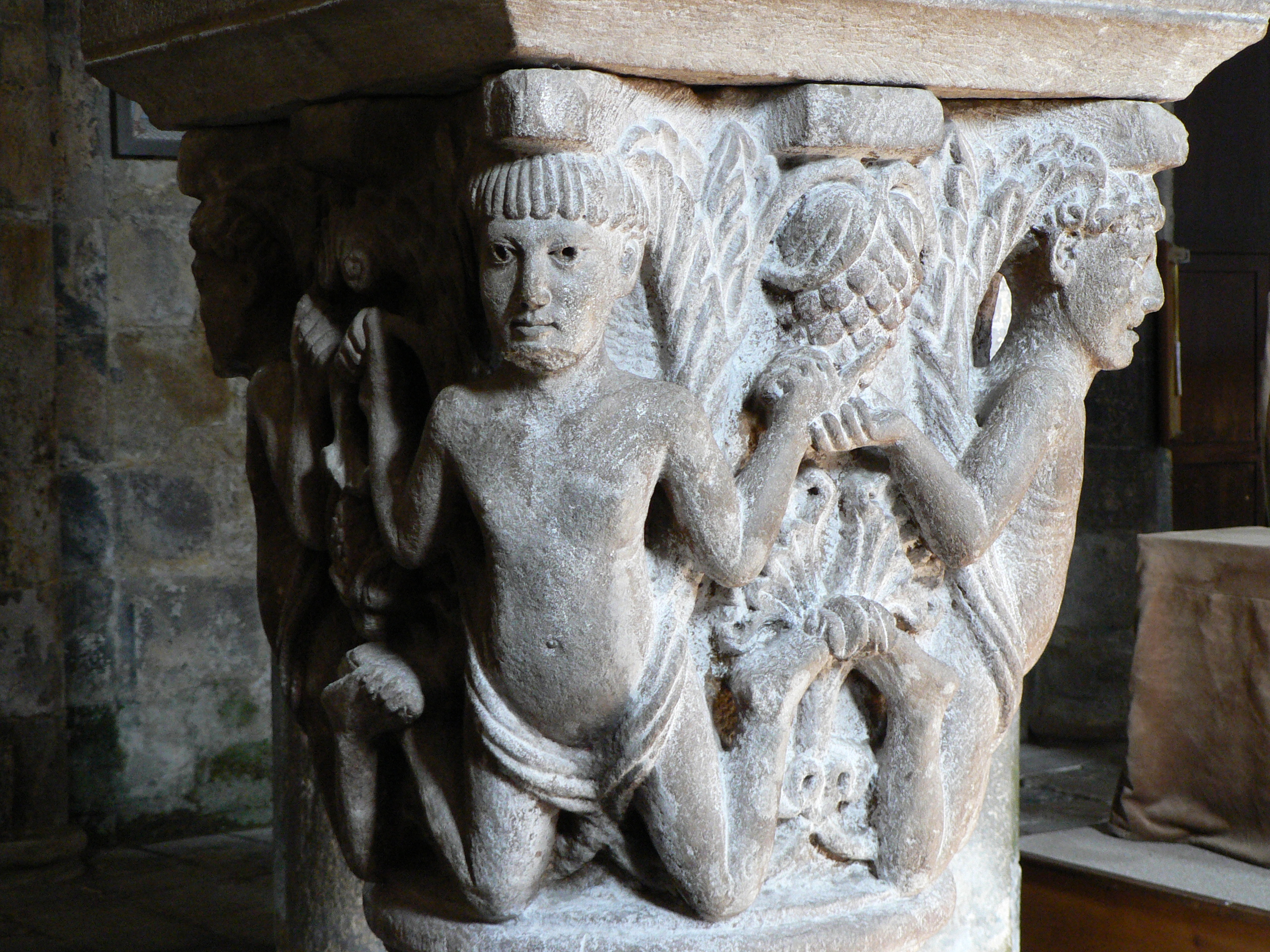
Romanesque capital with atlantes, Abbey of Saint-Pierre Mozac, Mozac, France, c.11th century

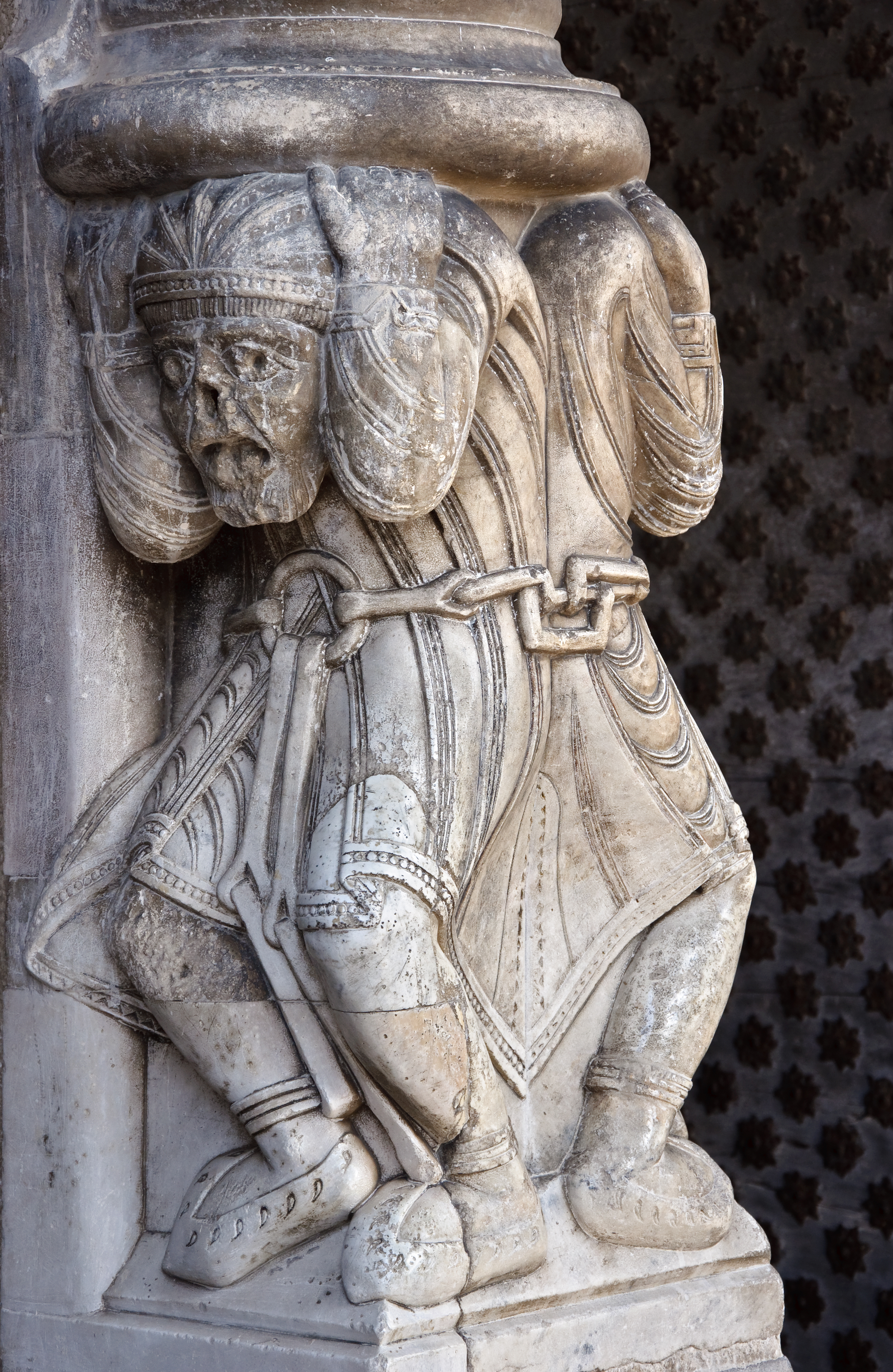
Two Romanesque Saracen atlantes in chains at Oloron Cathedral, France, early 12th century

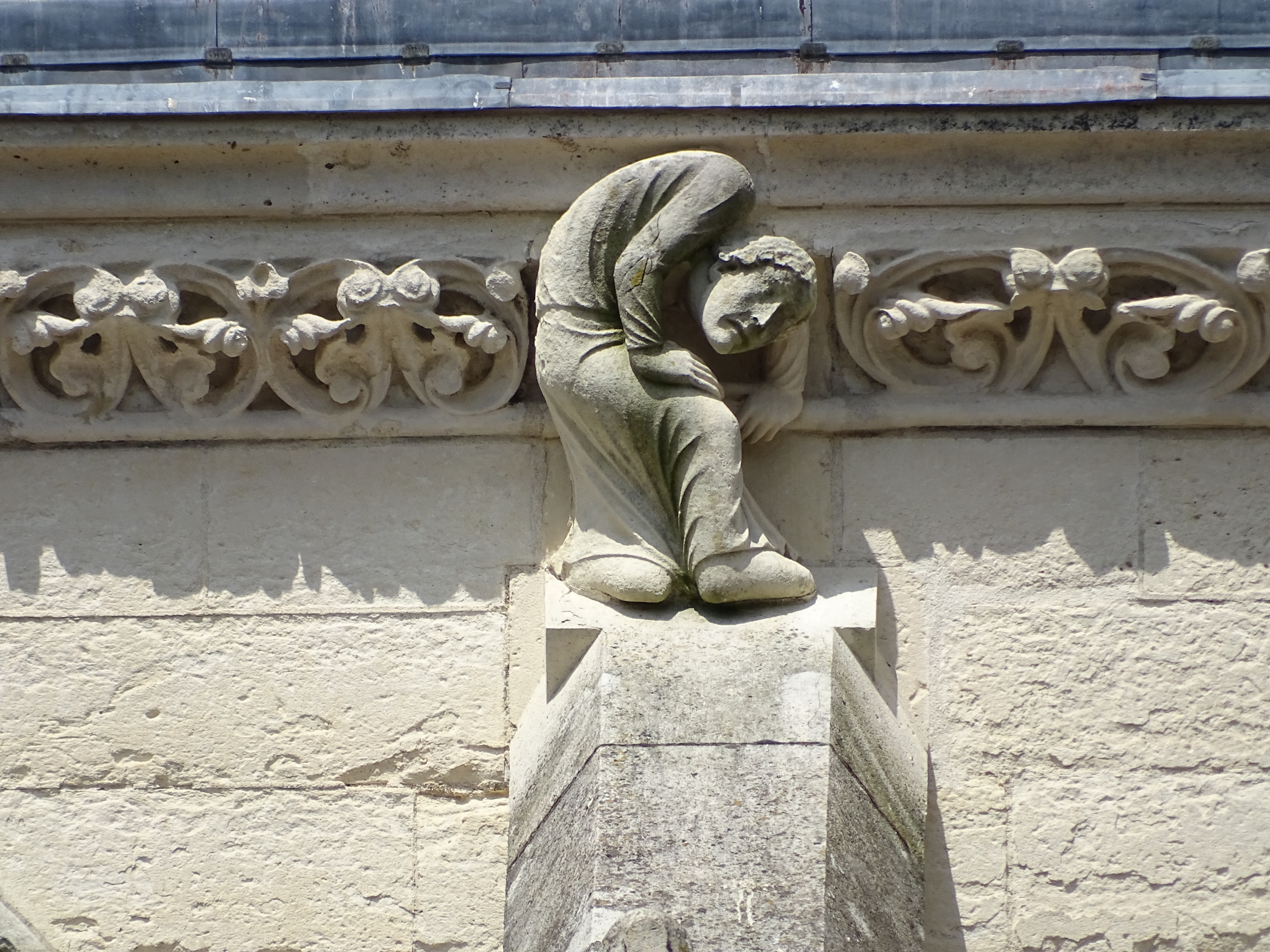
Gothic atlas on Laon Cathedral, France, 12th-13th centuries

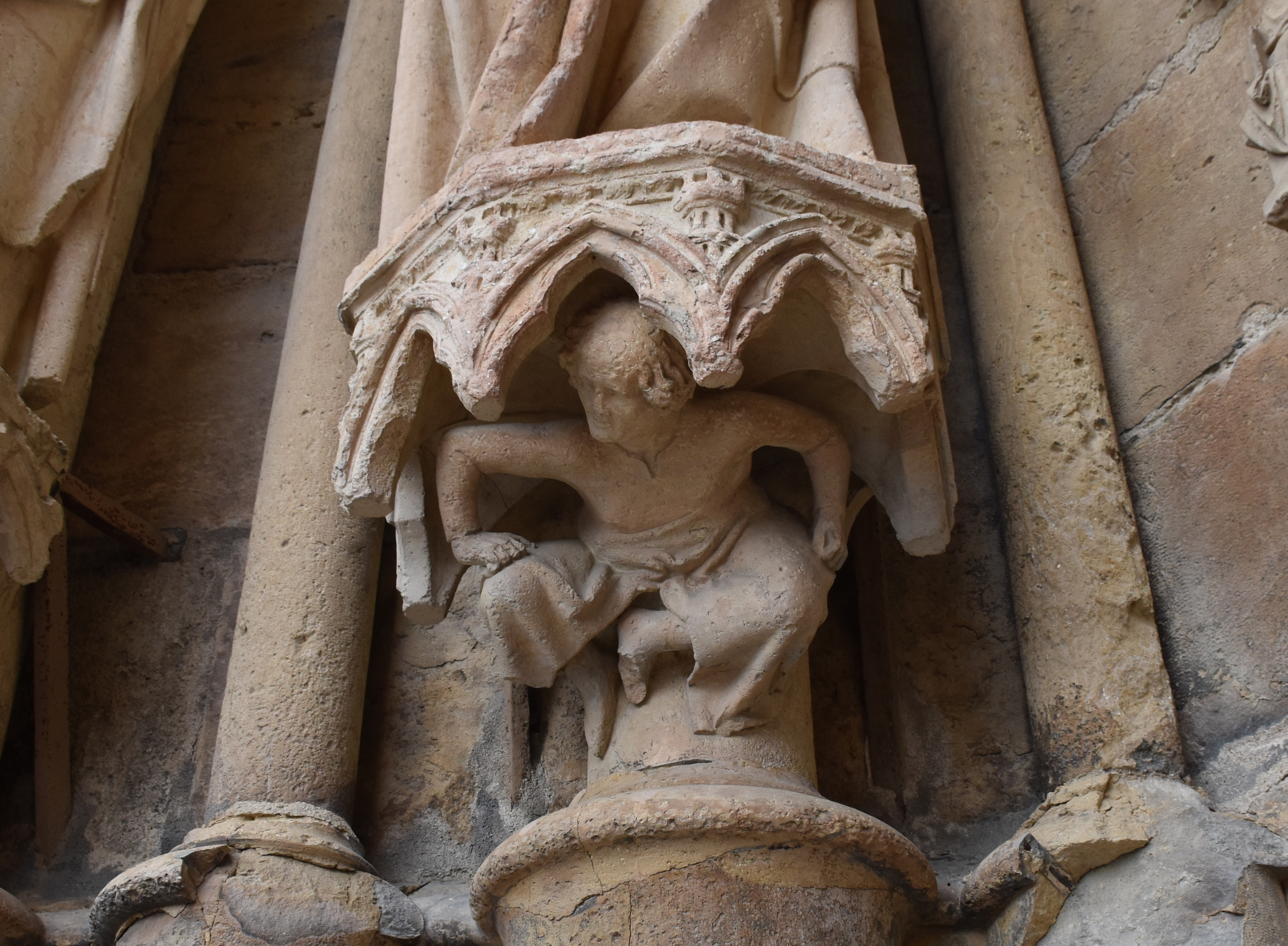
Gothic atlas supporting a statue of the west portals of the Reims Cathedral, Reims, France, 14th century

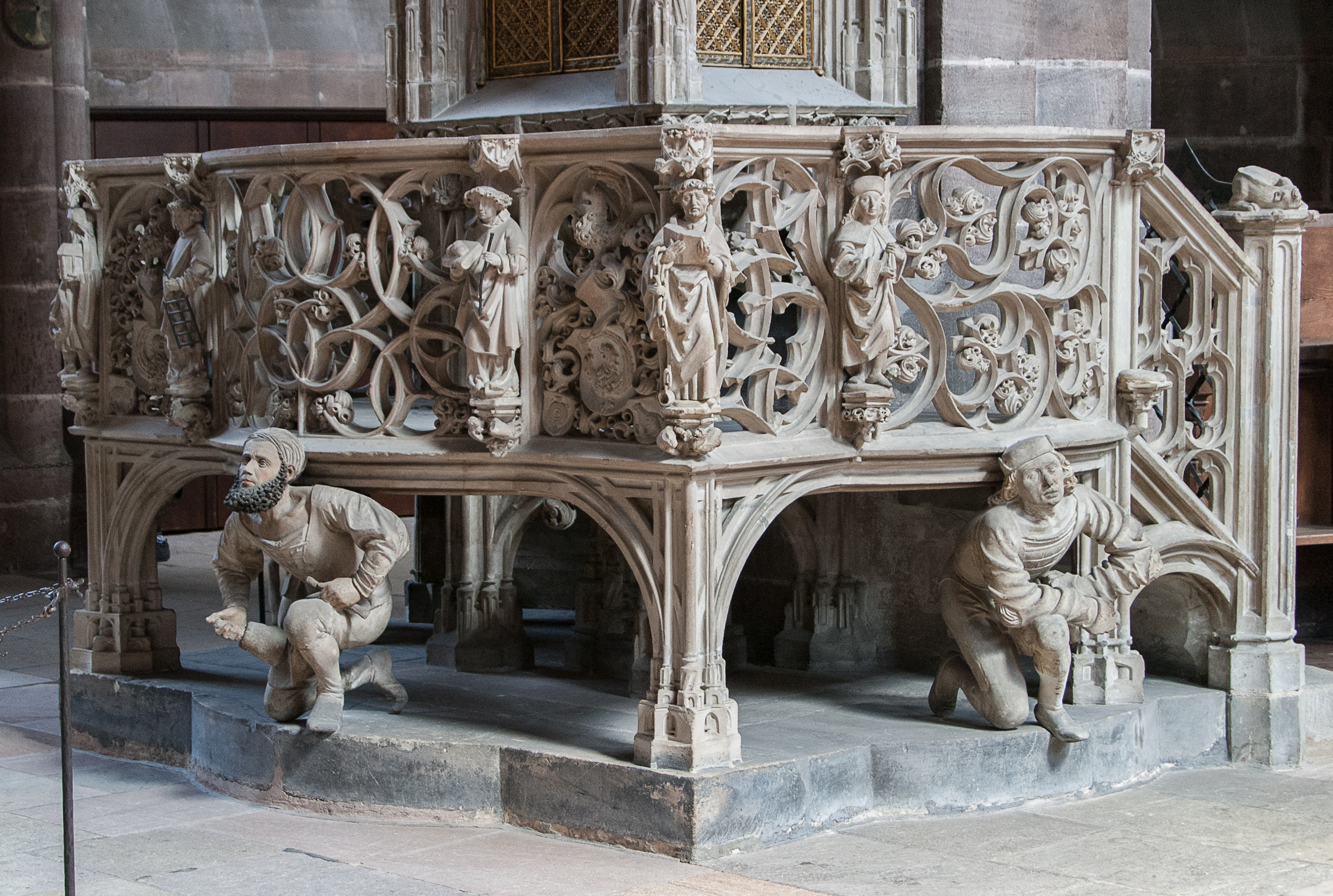
Gothic atlantes holding a church tabernacle on their back, on the left a self-portrait of its author, Adam Kraft, holding his mallet and chisel, 1493-1496, partly polychromed sandstone, St. Lorenz, Nuremberg, Germany

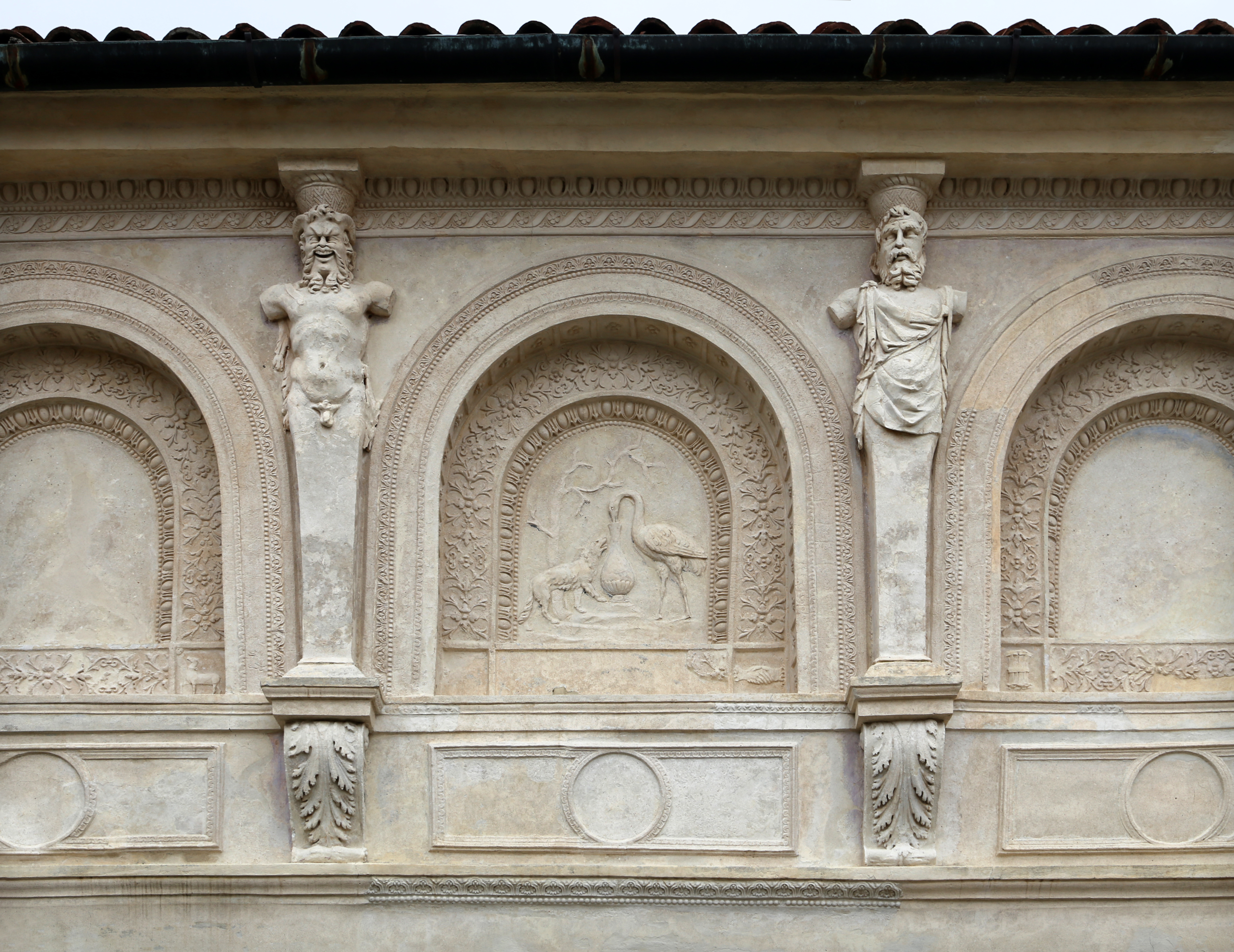
Renaissance atlantes in the courtyard of the Palazzo del Te, in the suburbs of Mantua, Italy, designed by Giulio Romano, 1524–1534

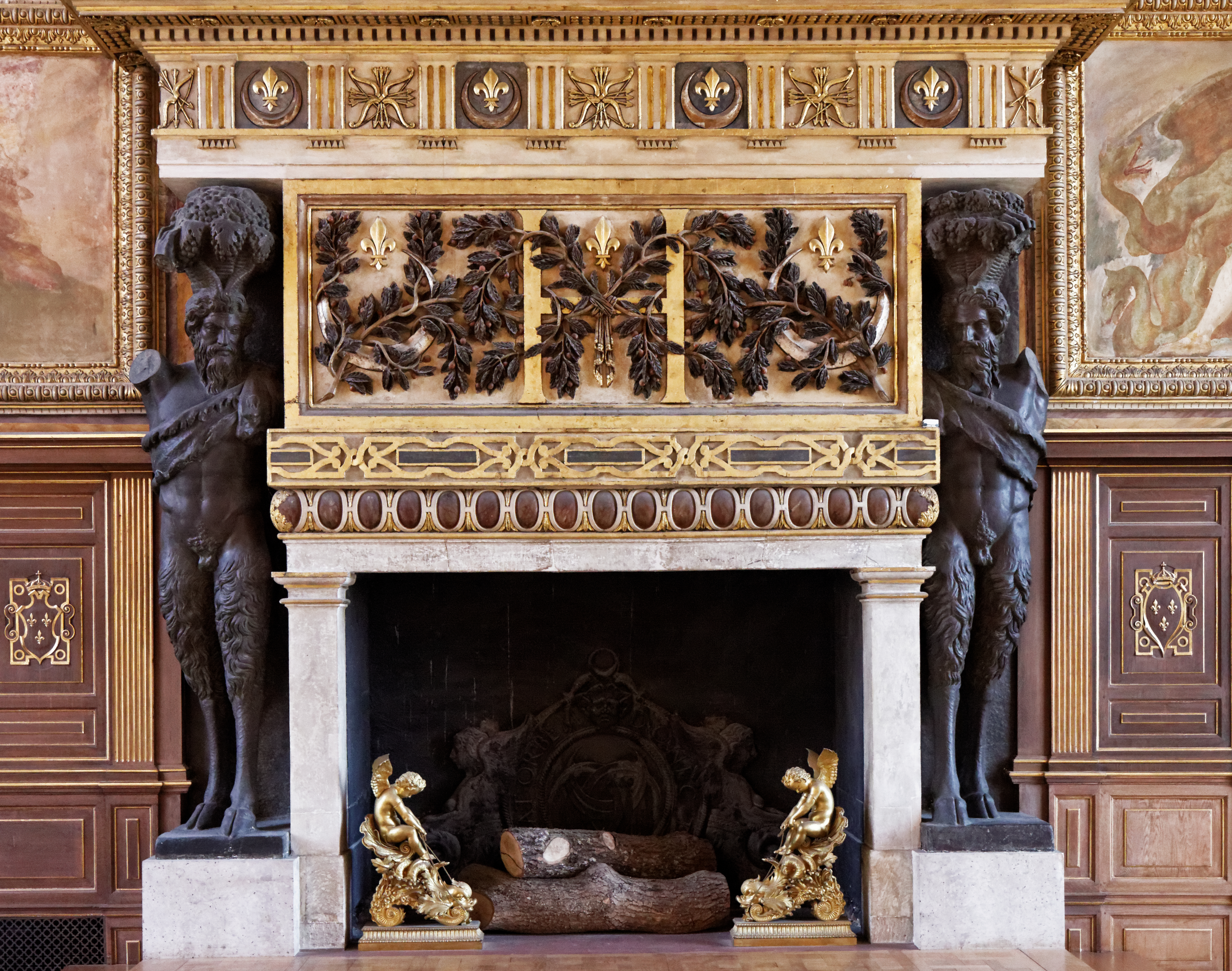
Renaissance fireplace with atlantes in the ballroom of the Palace of Fontainebleau, France, unknown architect, unknown date

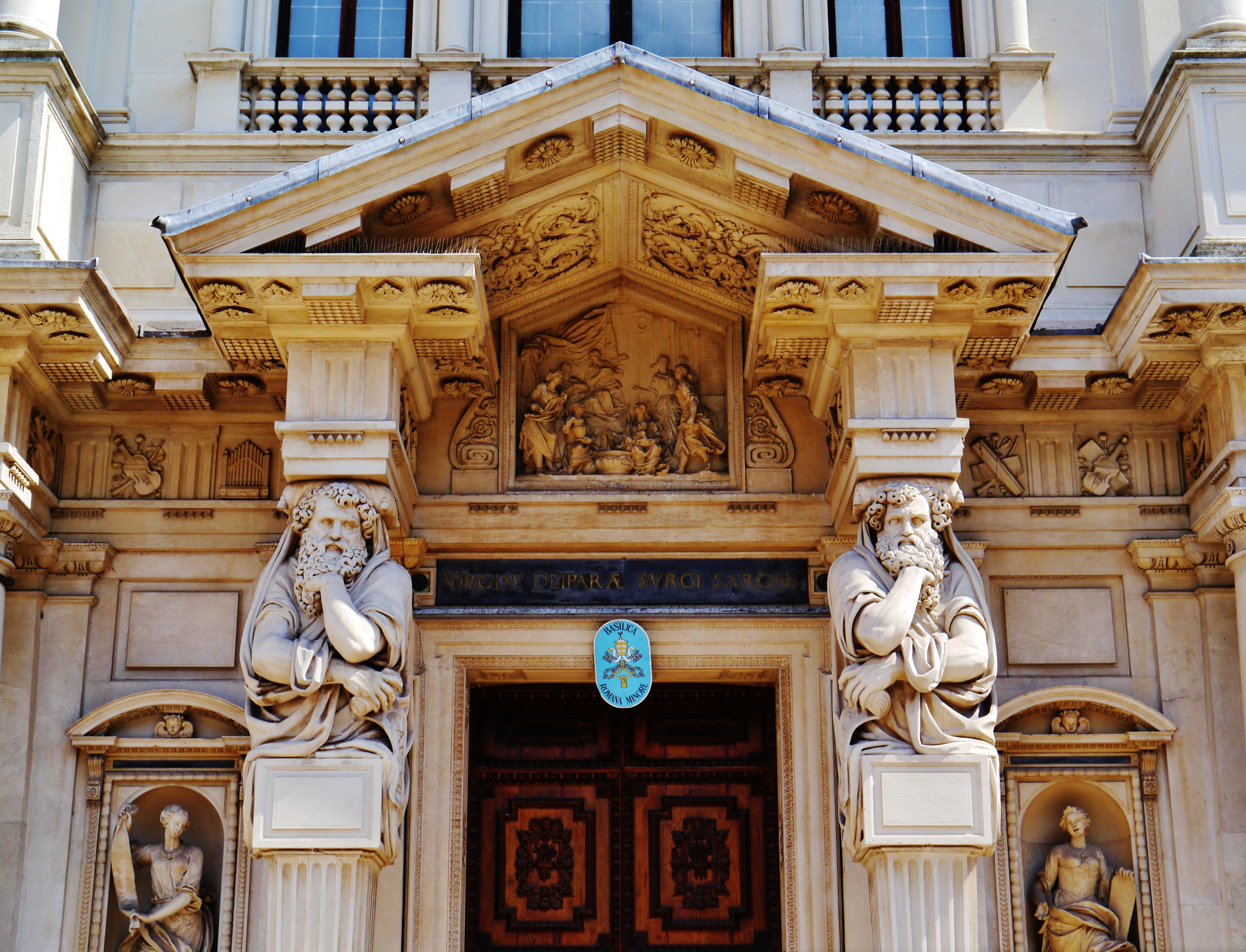
Mannerist atlantes of the Santuario della Beata Vergine dei Miracoli, Saronno, Italy, designed by Pellegrino Tibaldi, 1596-1613

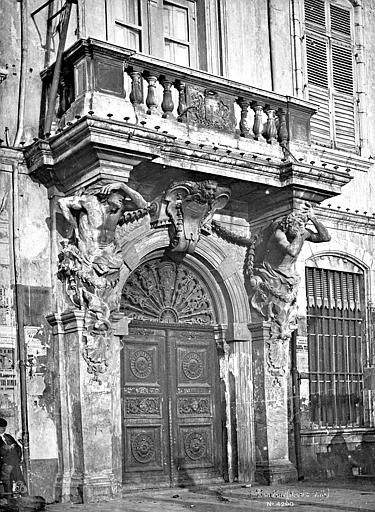
Baroque atlantes of the Hôtel de Ville doorway, Toulon, France, by Pierre Puget, 1656

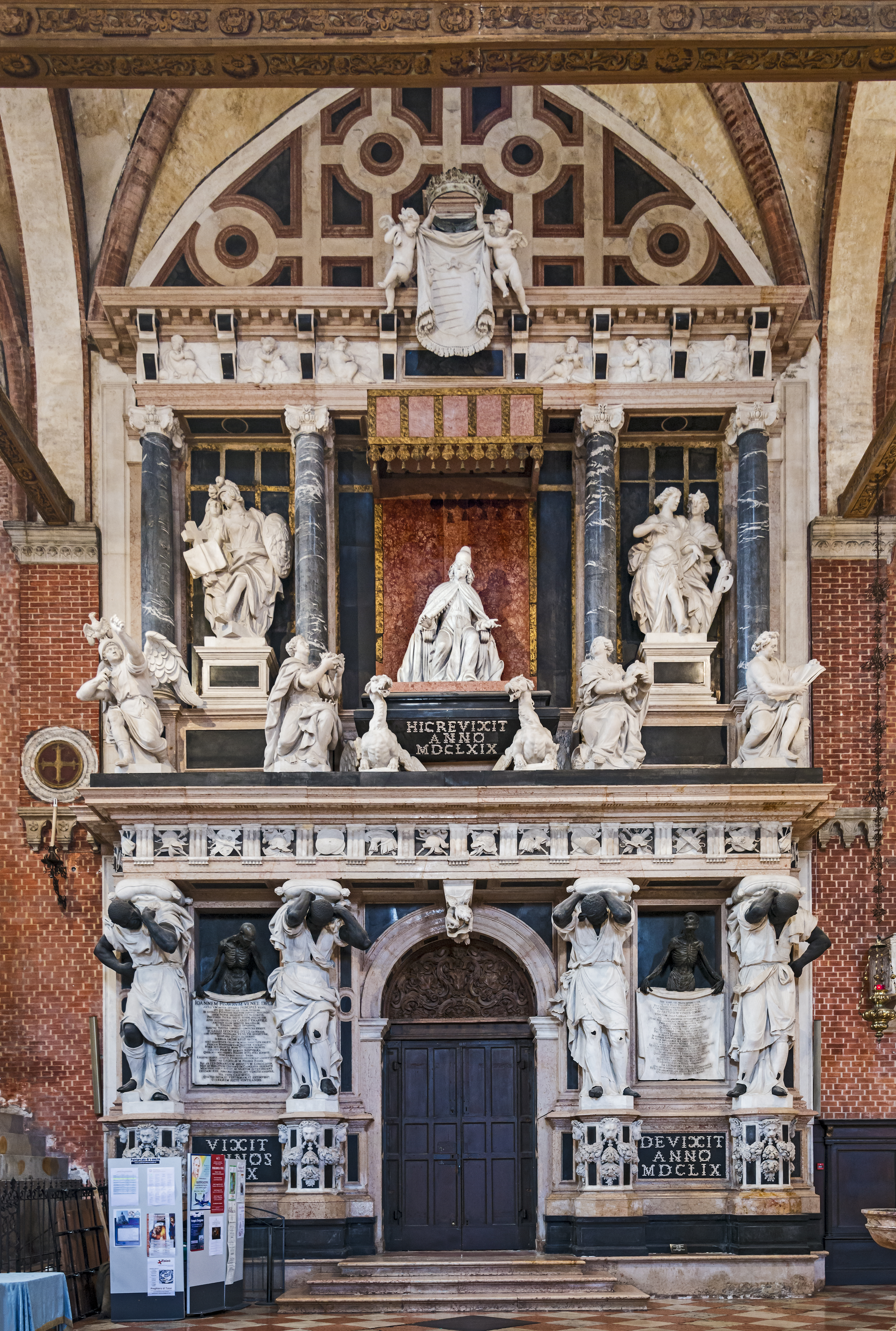
Baroque Black atlantes of the Tomb of Giovanni Pesaro, by Baldassare Longhena and Melchior Barthel, 1665-1669, marble and bronze, Santa Maria Gloriosa dei Frari, Venice

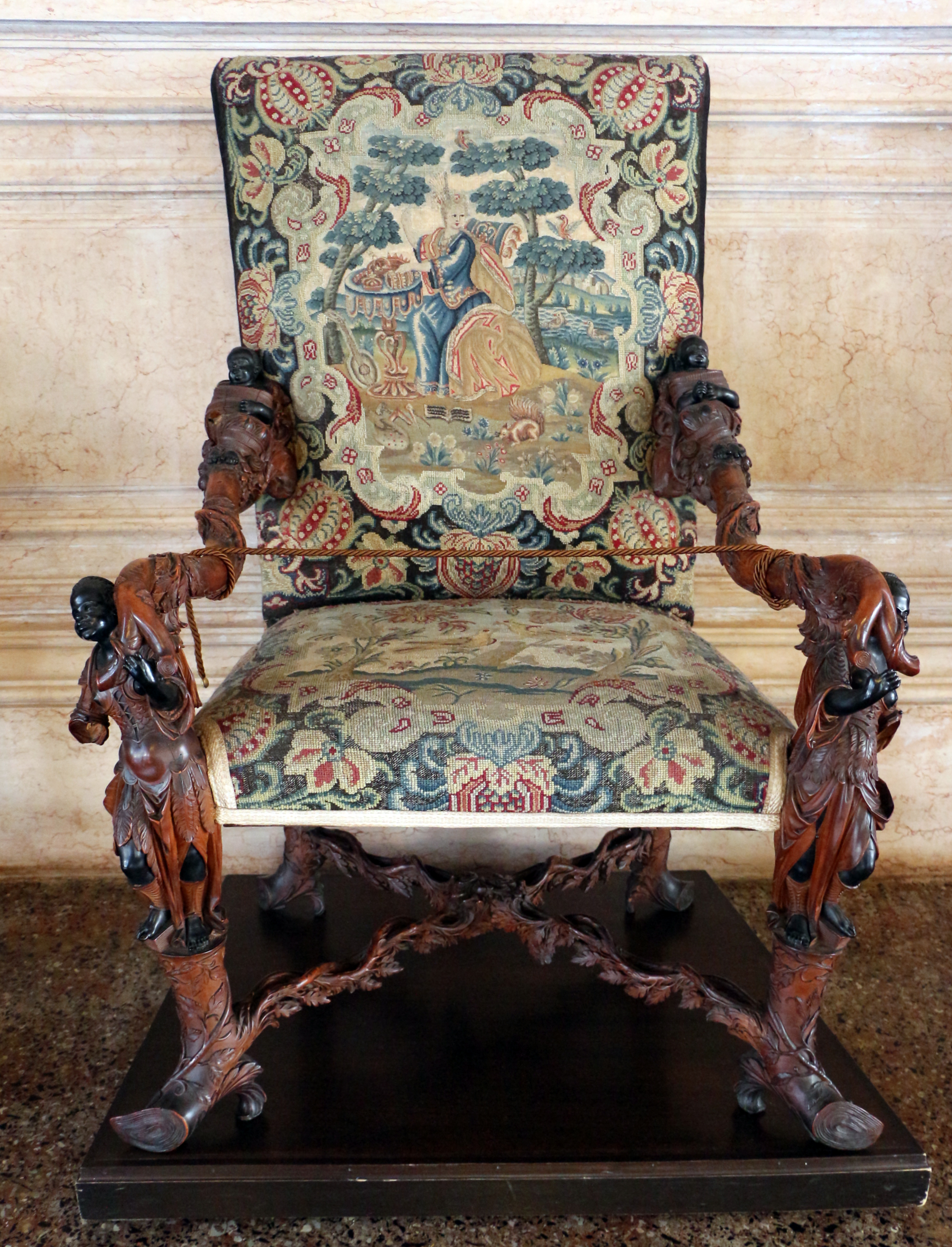
Baroque atlantes of an armchair, by Andrea Brustolon, c.1700-1715, wood and upholstery, Ca' Rezzonico, Venice

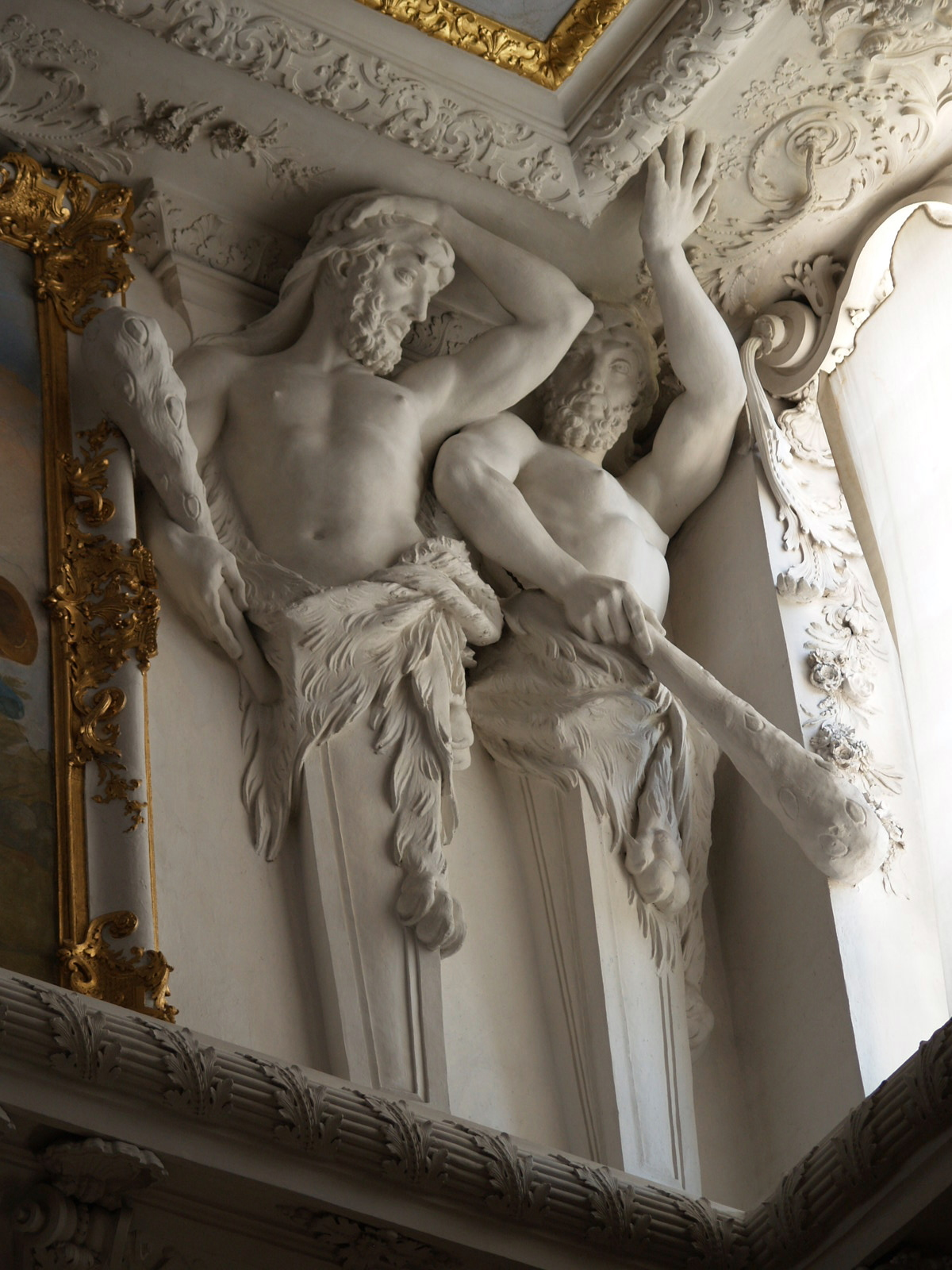
Rococo atlantes in the Schleissheim Palace, Munich, Germany, probably by Joseph Effner, early 18th century

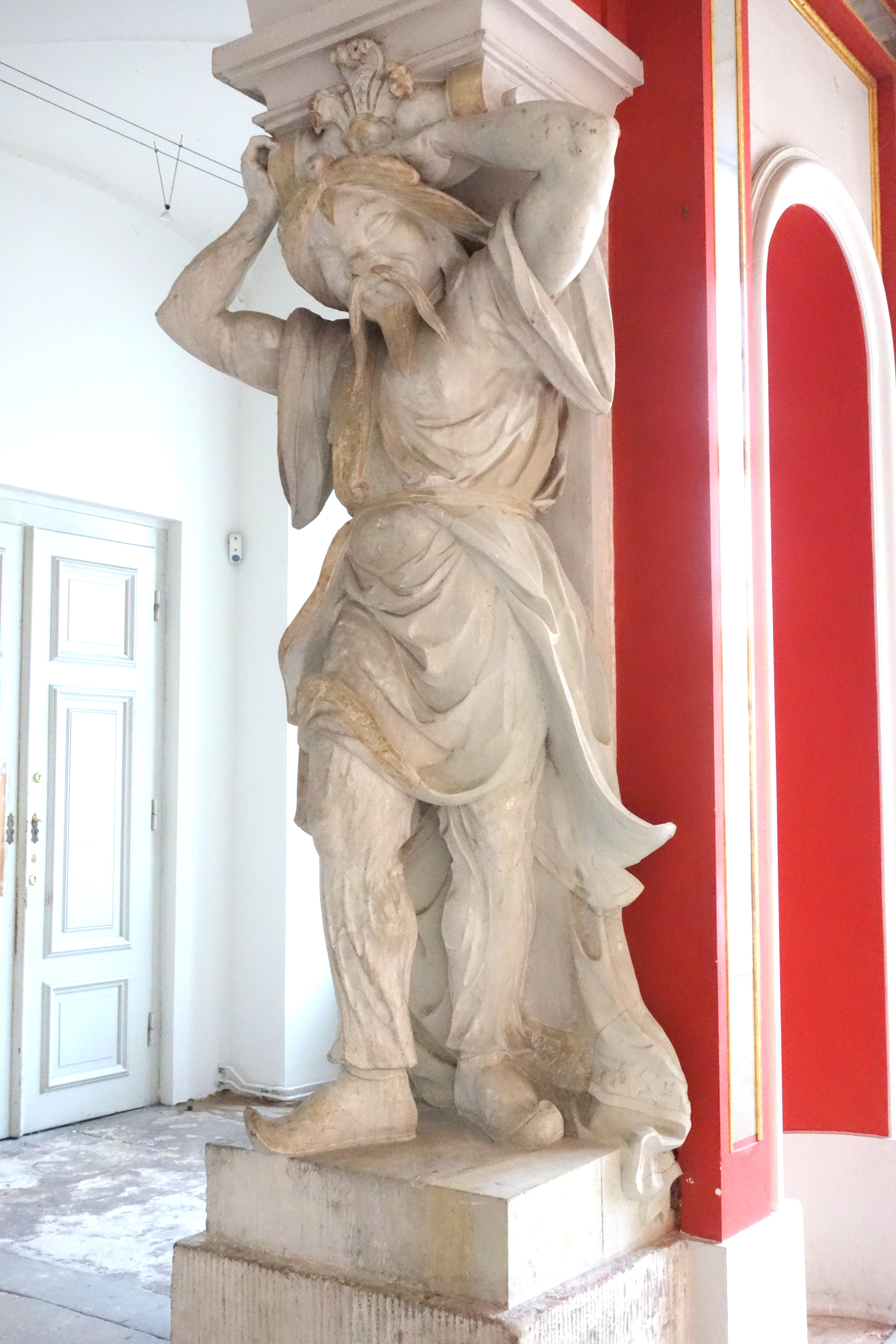
Chinoiserie atlas of the Japanese Palace, Dresden, Germany, designed by Matthäus Daniel Pöppelmann, Zacharias Longuelune or Jean de Bodt, 1715-1731

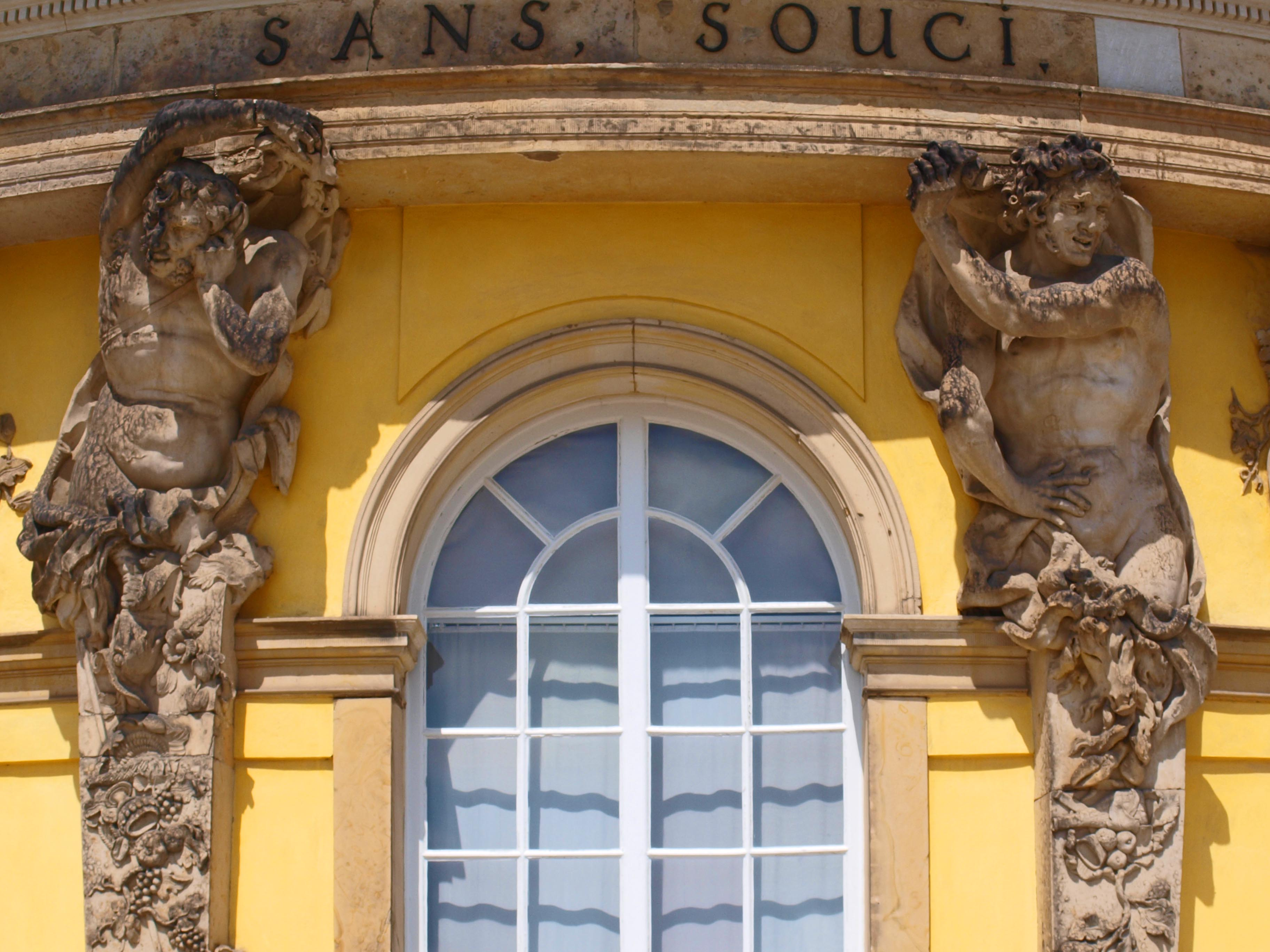
Rococo atlantes at Sanssouci, Potsdam, Germany, by Georg Wenzeslaus von Knobelsdorff, 1748

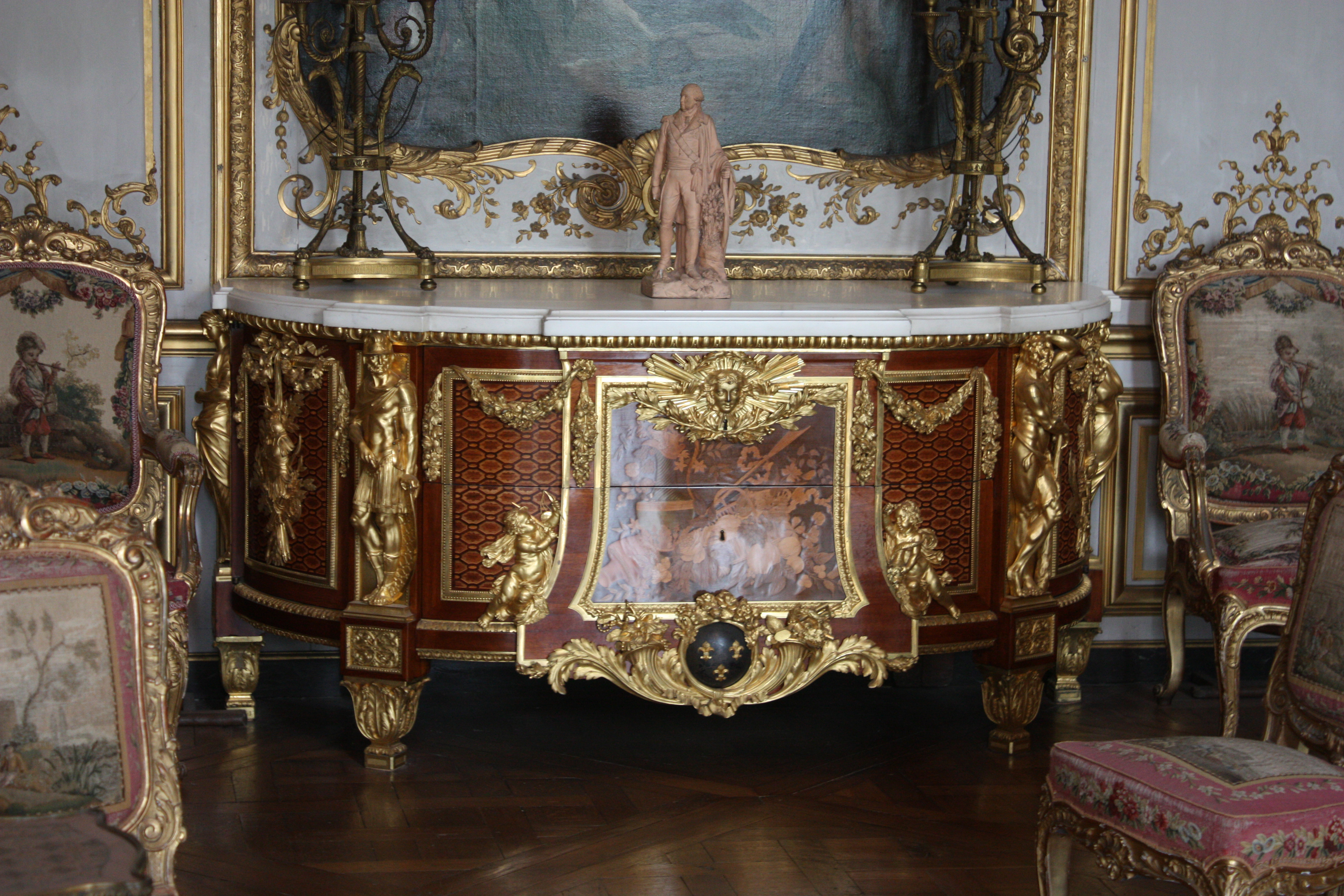
Louis XVI style altantes on a commode, by Jean-Henri Riesener, 1775, gilt brone, marble top, and various types of wood, Musée Condé, Chantilly, France

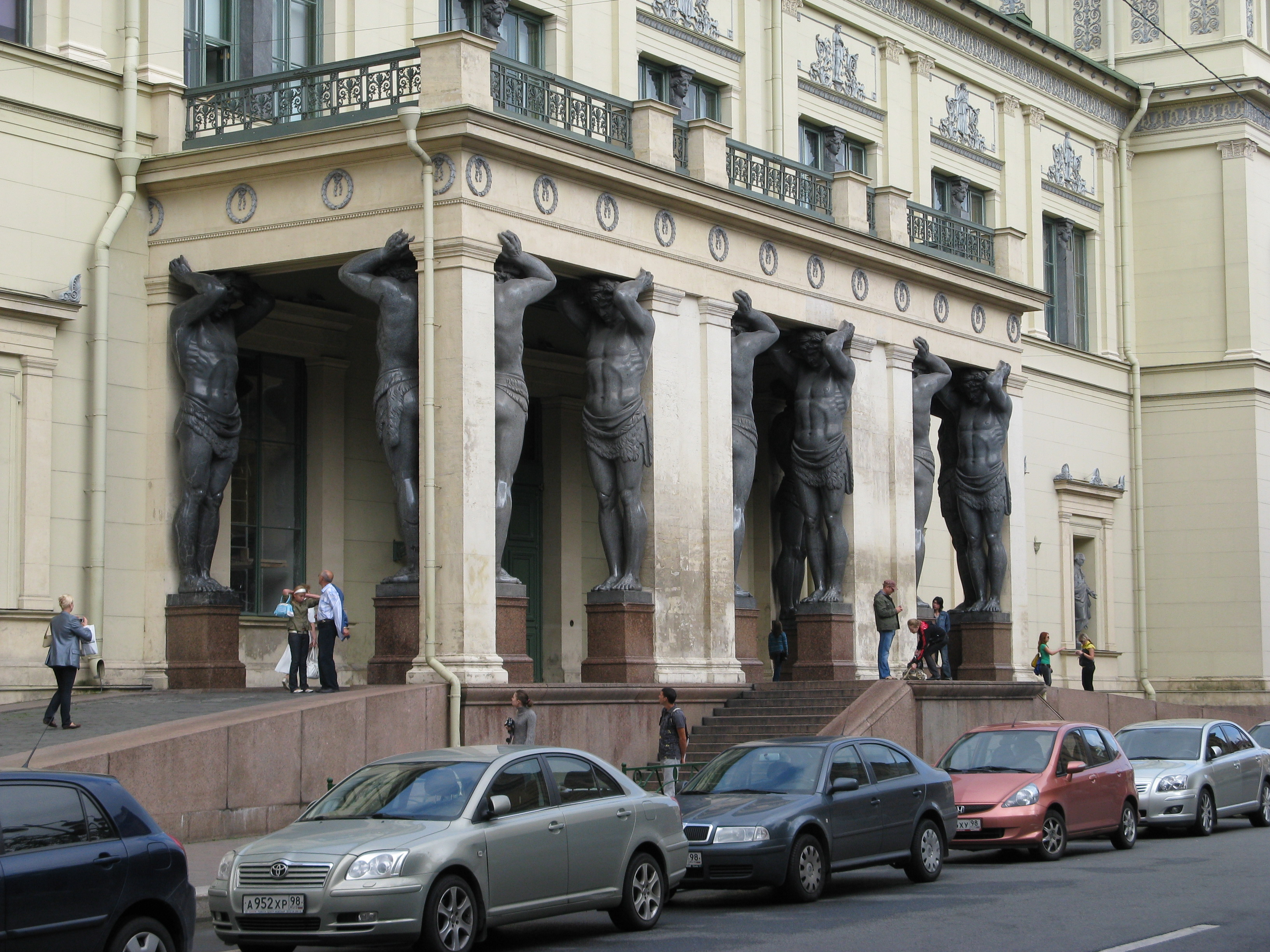
Neoclassical atlantes of the New Hermitage, Saint-Petersburg, Russia, designed by Leo von Klenze and sculpted by Alexandre Terebeniov, 1842—1851

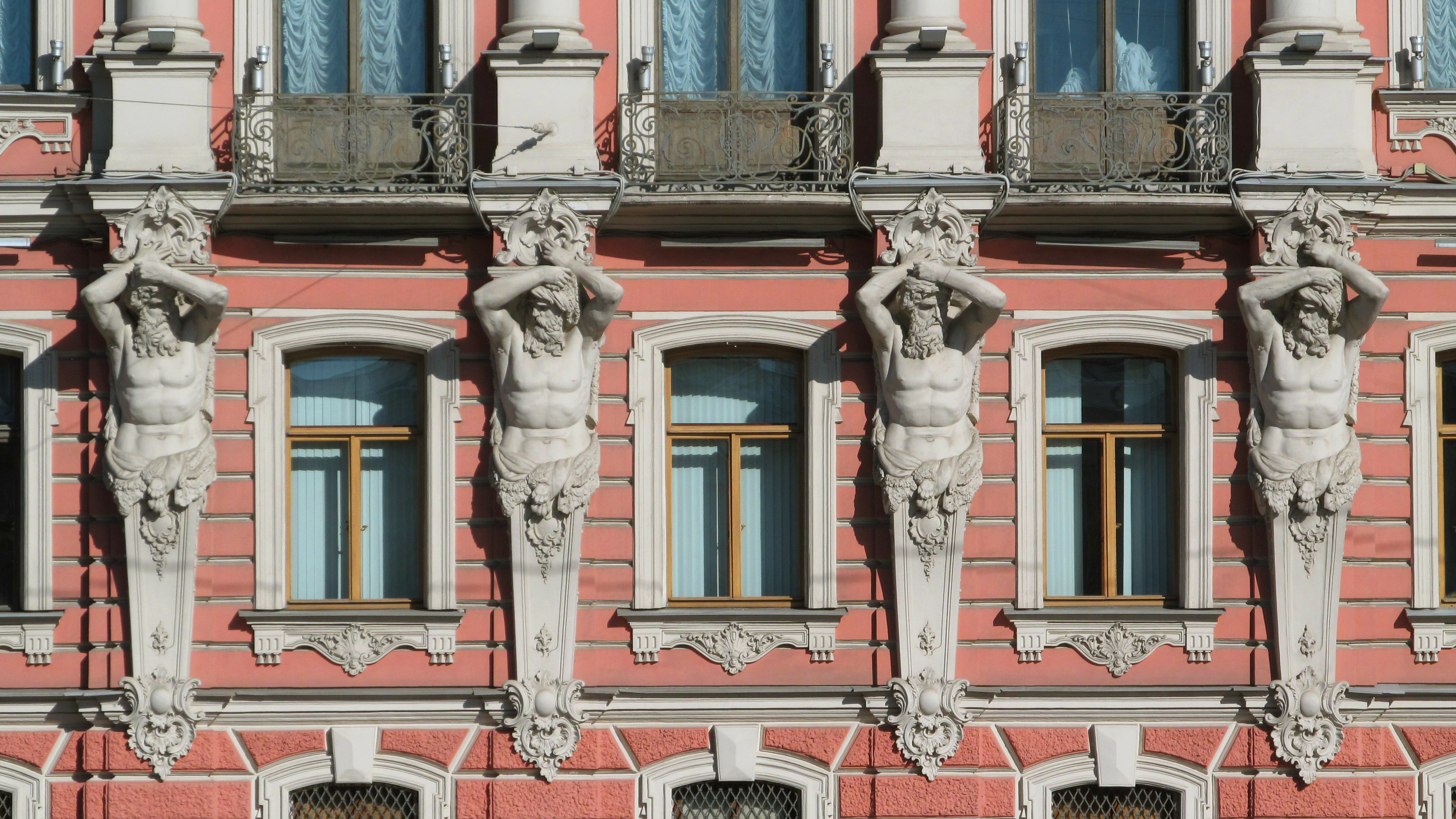
Rococo Revival atlantes on the facade of the Beloselsky-Belozersky Palace, Saint Petersburg, designed by Andrei Stackenschneider, 1847-1848

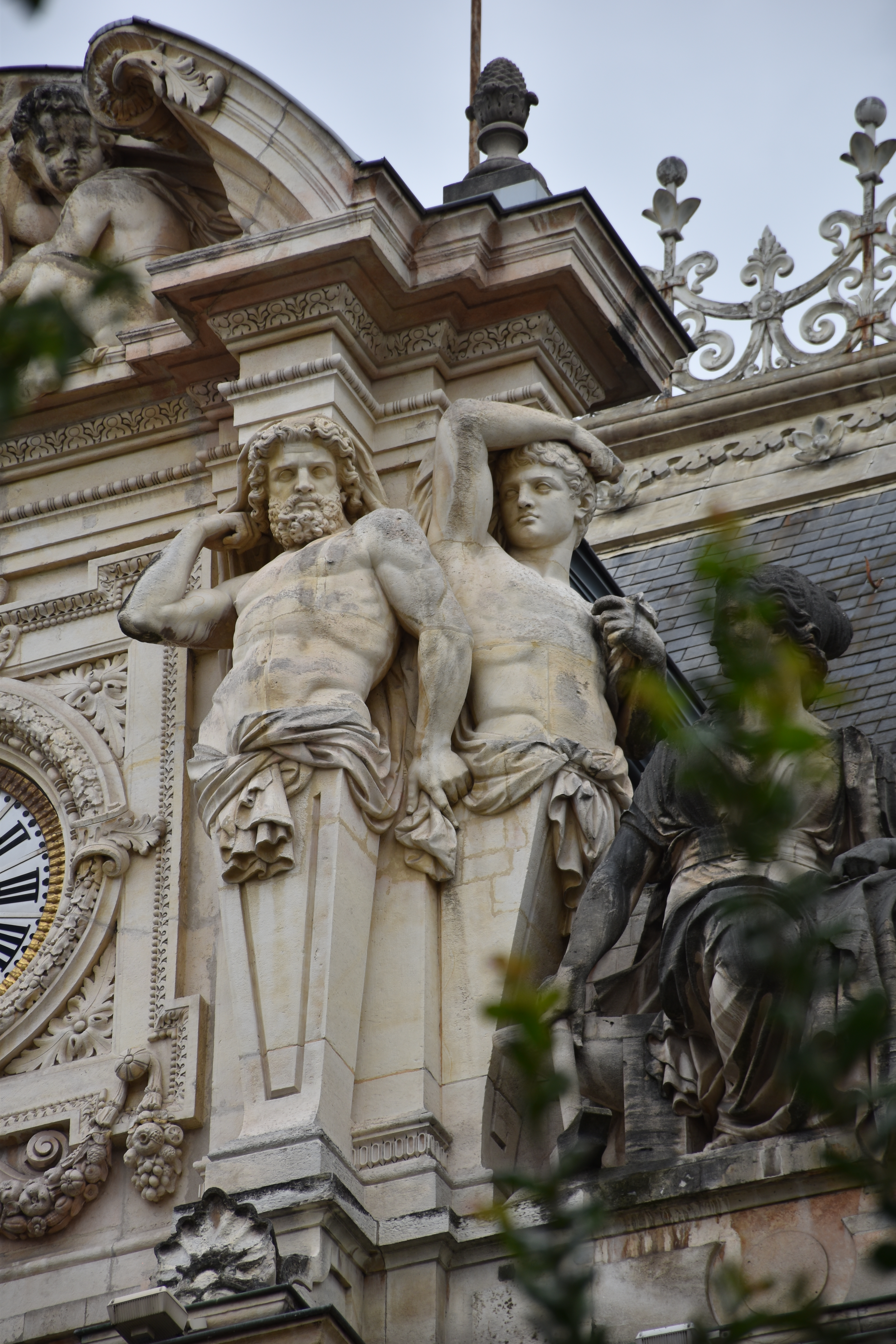
Baroque Revival atlantes of the Palais de la Bourse, Lyon, France, designed by René Dardel and sculpted by Jean-Marie Bonnassieux, 1854-1860

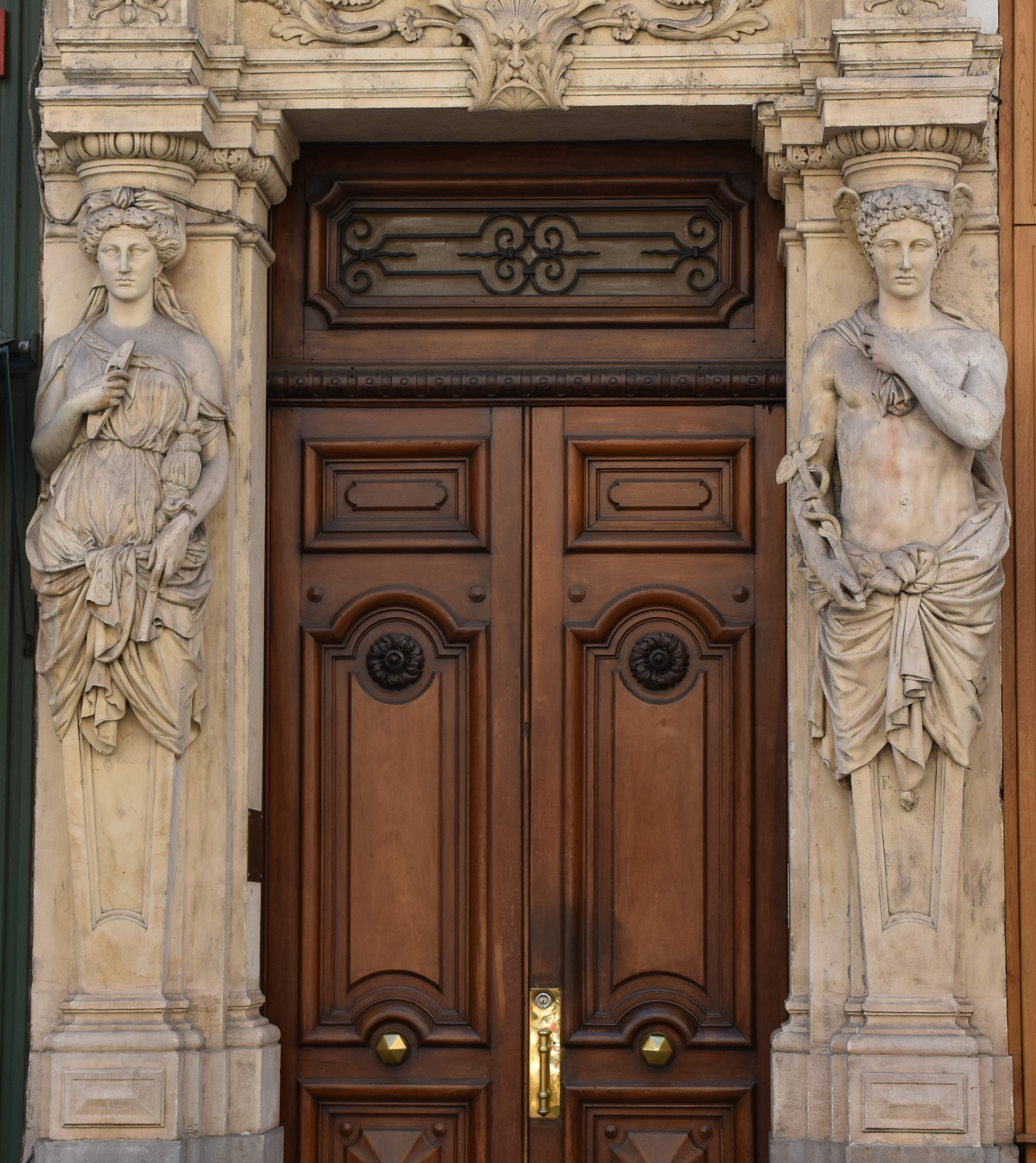
Neoclassical atlas of Mercury and a caryatid of Minerva of Rue Édouard-Herriot no. 39, Lyon, sculpted by Joseph-Hugues Fabisch, 1863

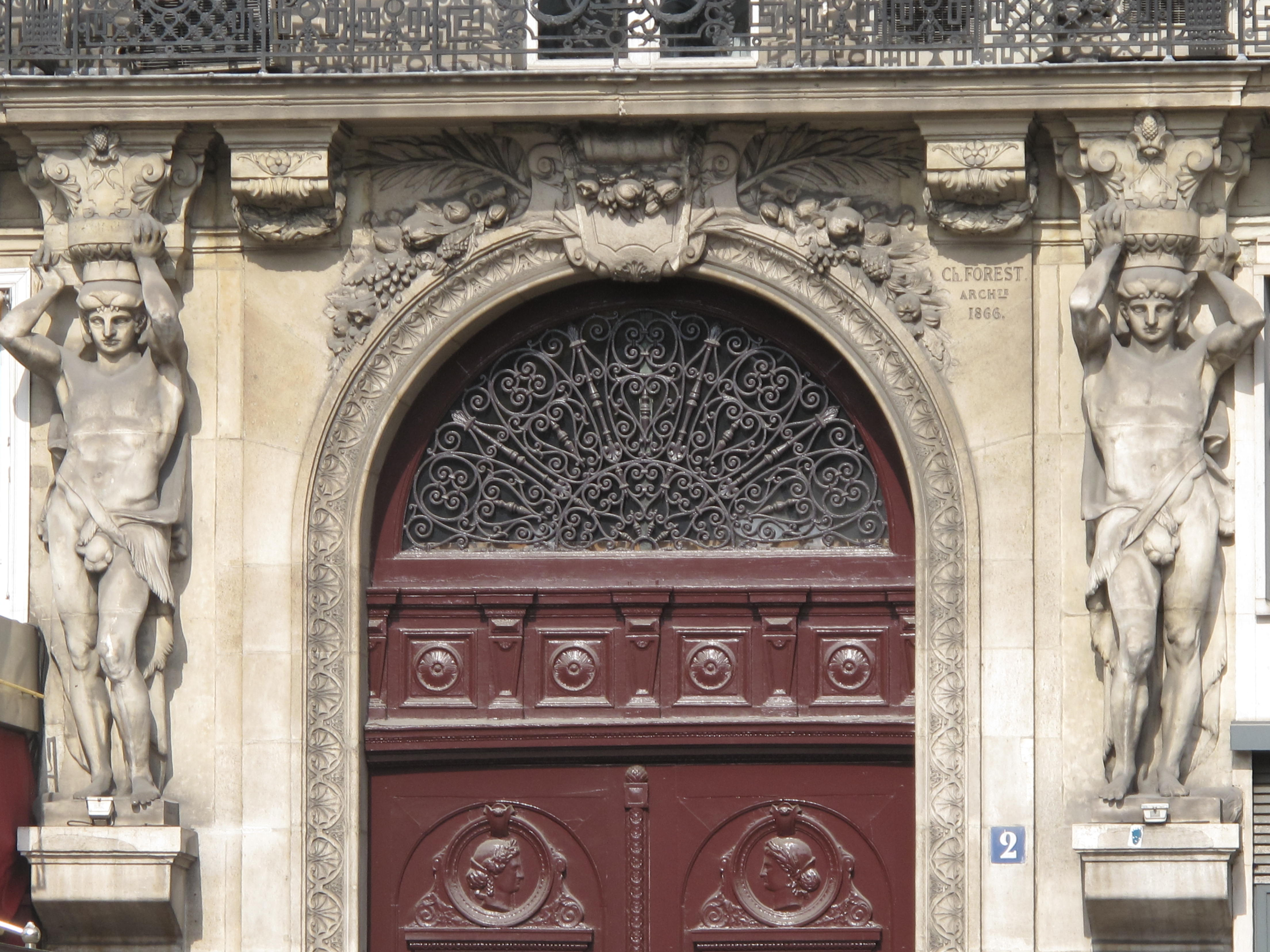
Neoclassical atlantes of Place d'Estienne-d'Orves no. 2, Paris, sculptor Joseph Caillé and architect Ch. Forest, 1866

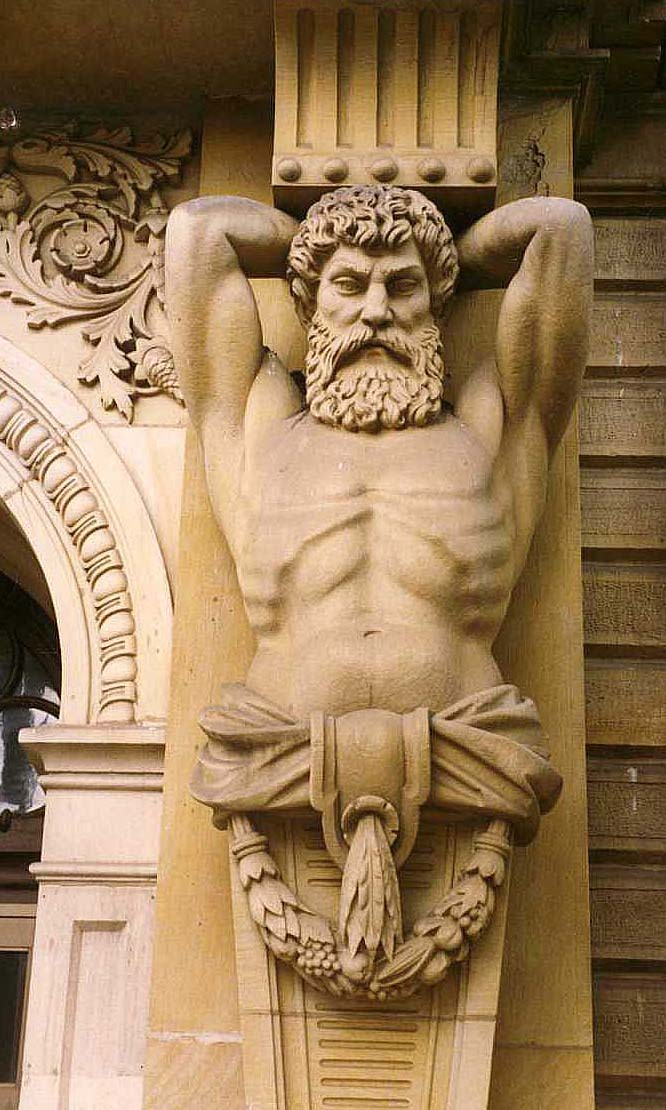
Second Empire style Atlantid at the Wayne County Courthouse, Wooster, Ohio, United States. Unknown sculptor, architect Thomas Boyd, circa 1887-89.

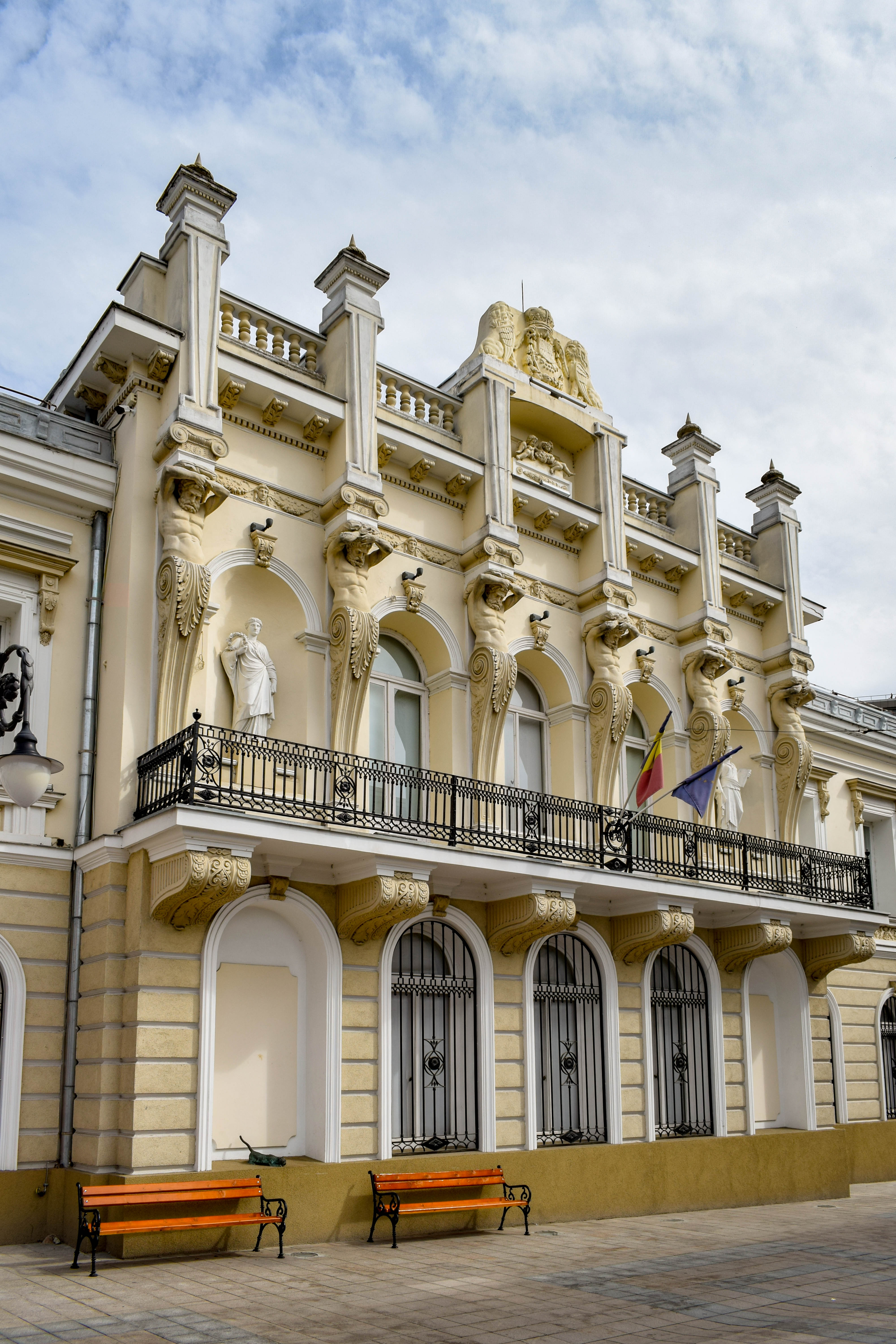
Baroque Revival atlases on the Catargiu House, today the Union Museum, Iași, Romania, unknown architect, c.1880

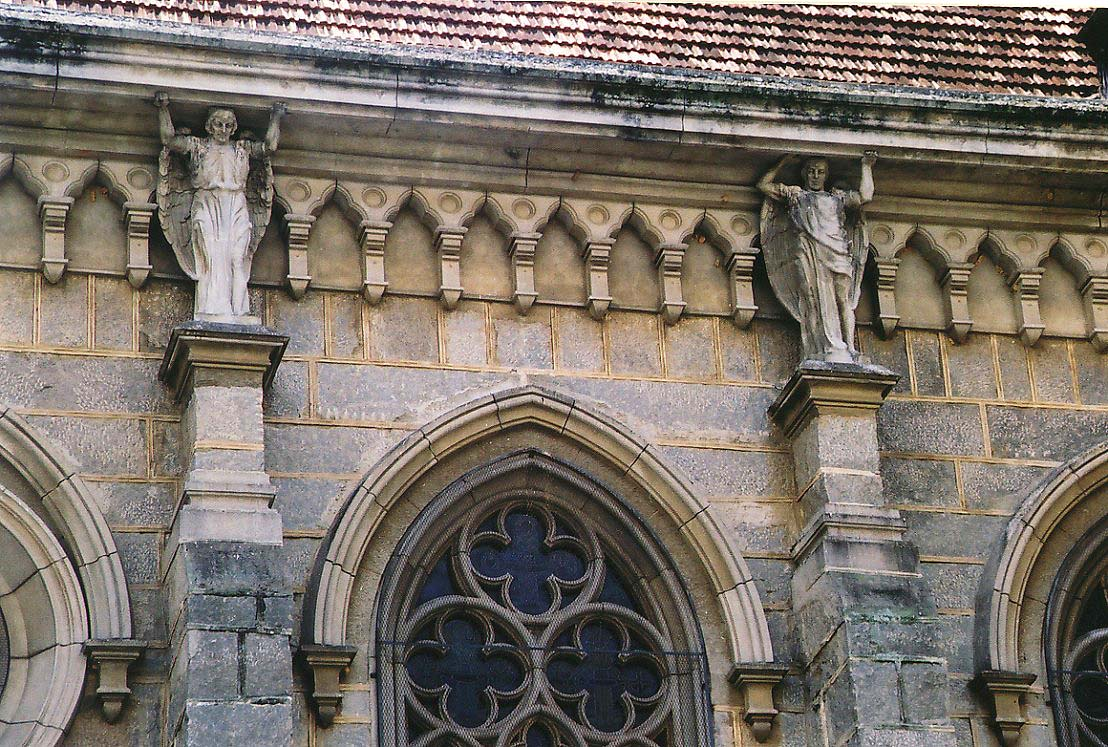
Gothic Revival angel atlantes on the Cathedral of Saint Peter of Alcantara, Petrópolis, Brazil, designed by Francisco Caminhoá, 1884–1925

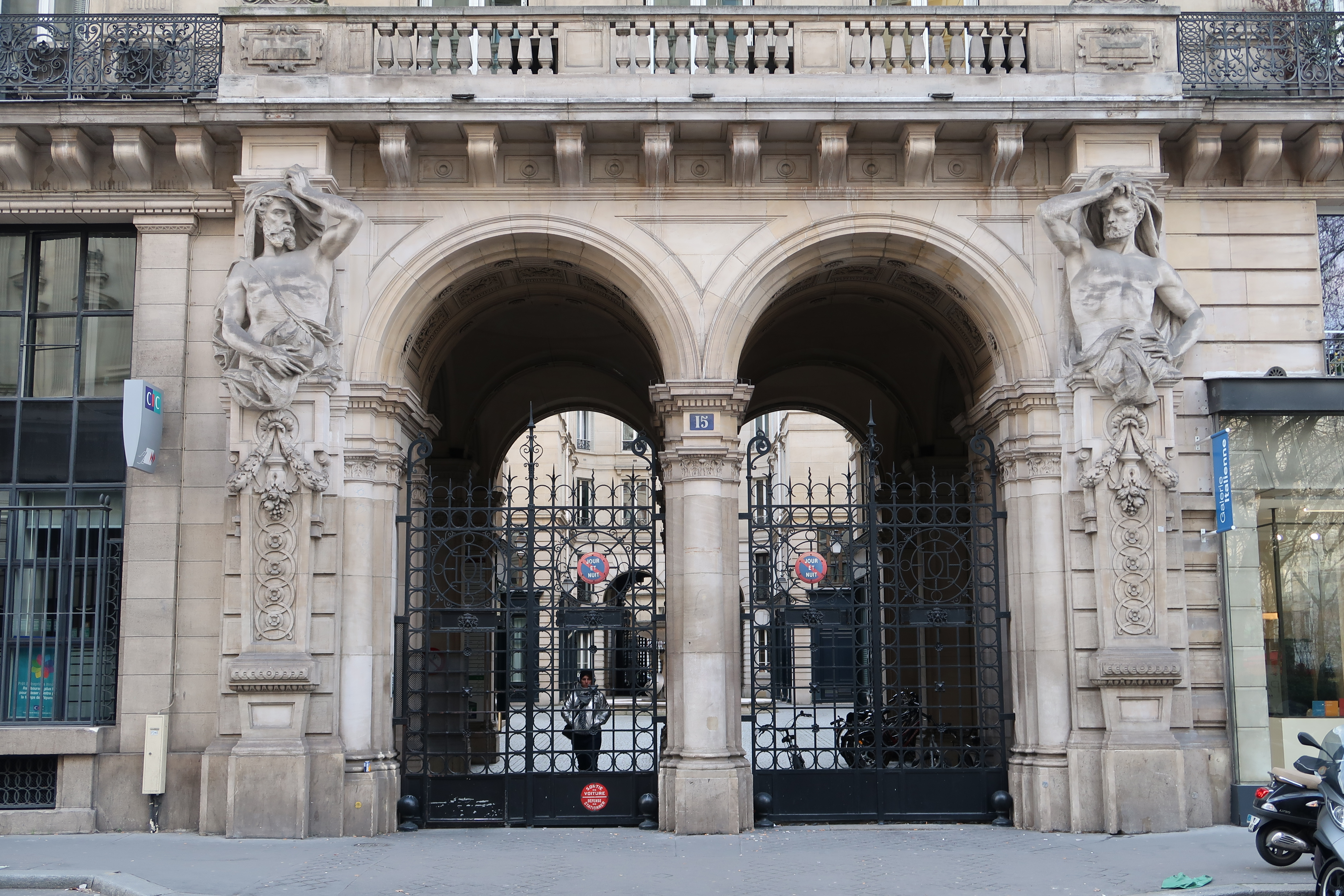
Beaux Arts atlantes at a monumental entrance in Paris, unknown architect and sculptor, c.1900

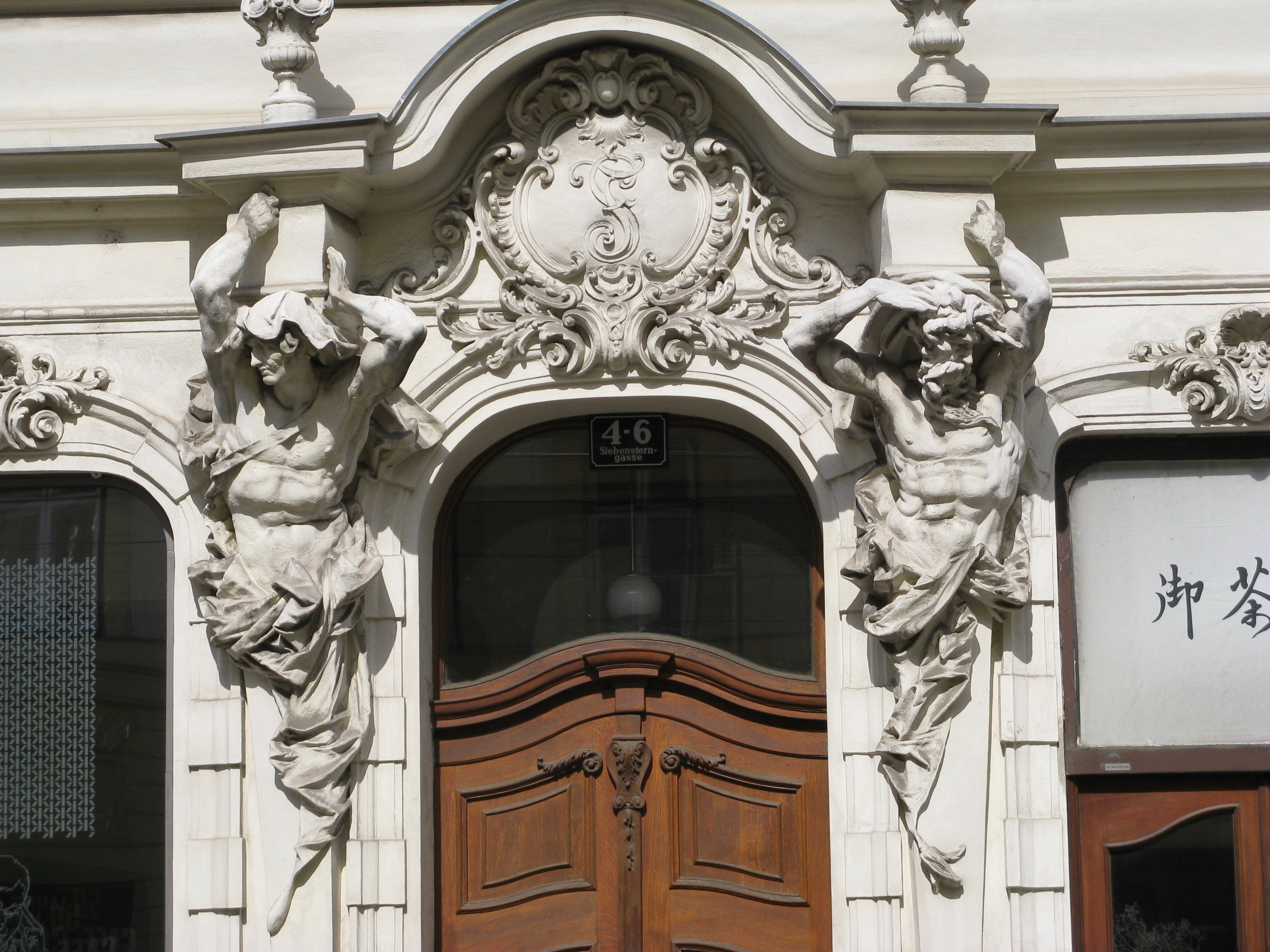
Rococo Revival atlantes of Siebensterngasse no. 4-6, Vienna, Austria, unknown architect and sculptor, c.1900

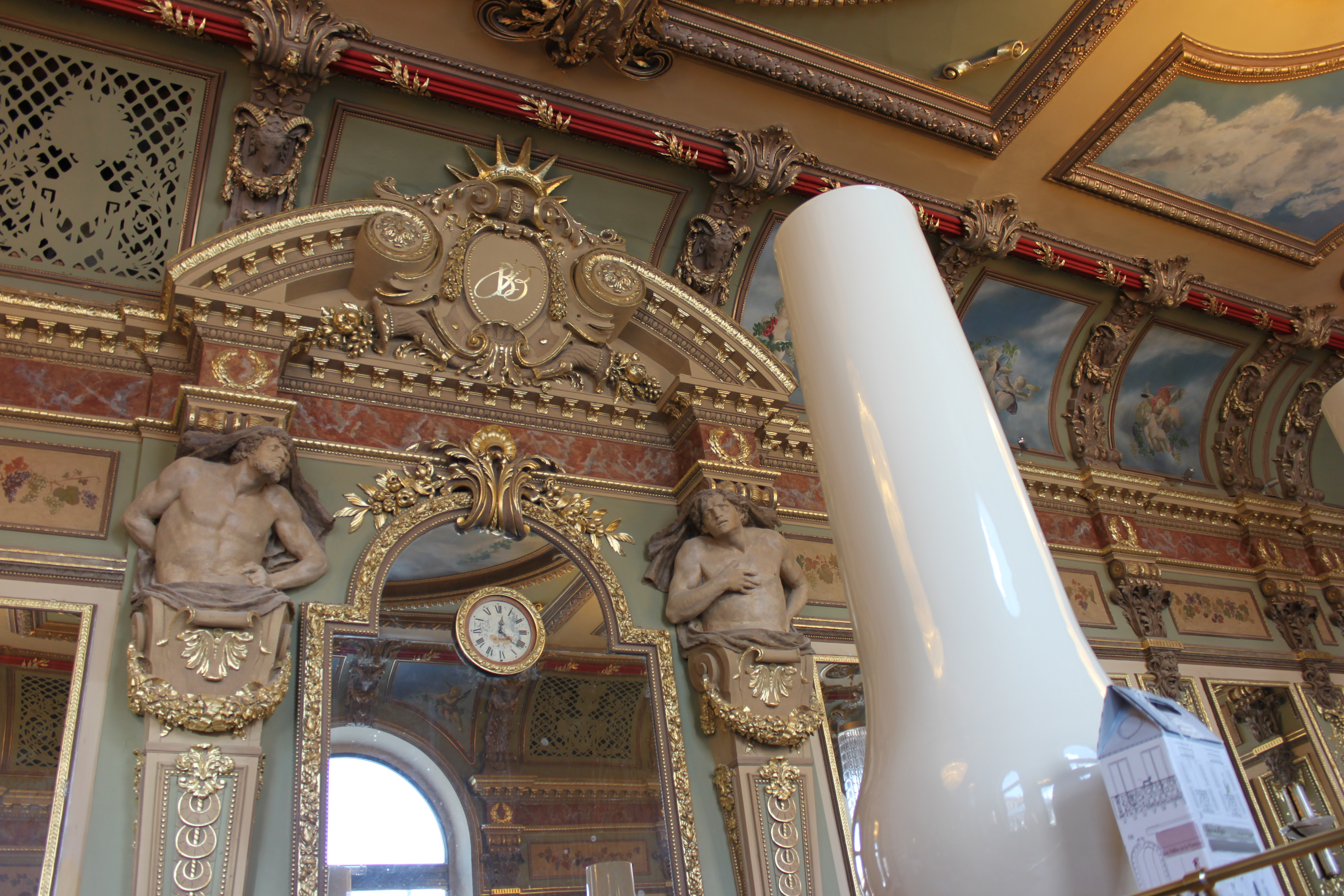
Beaux Arts atlantes in the Café Bibent (Place du Capitole no. 5), Toulouse, France, 1900-1910

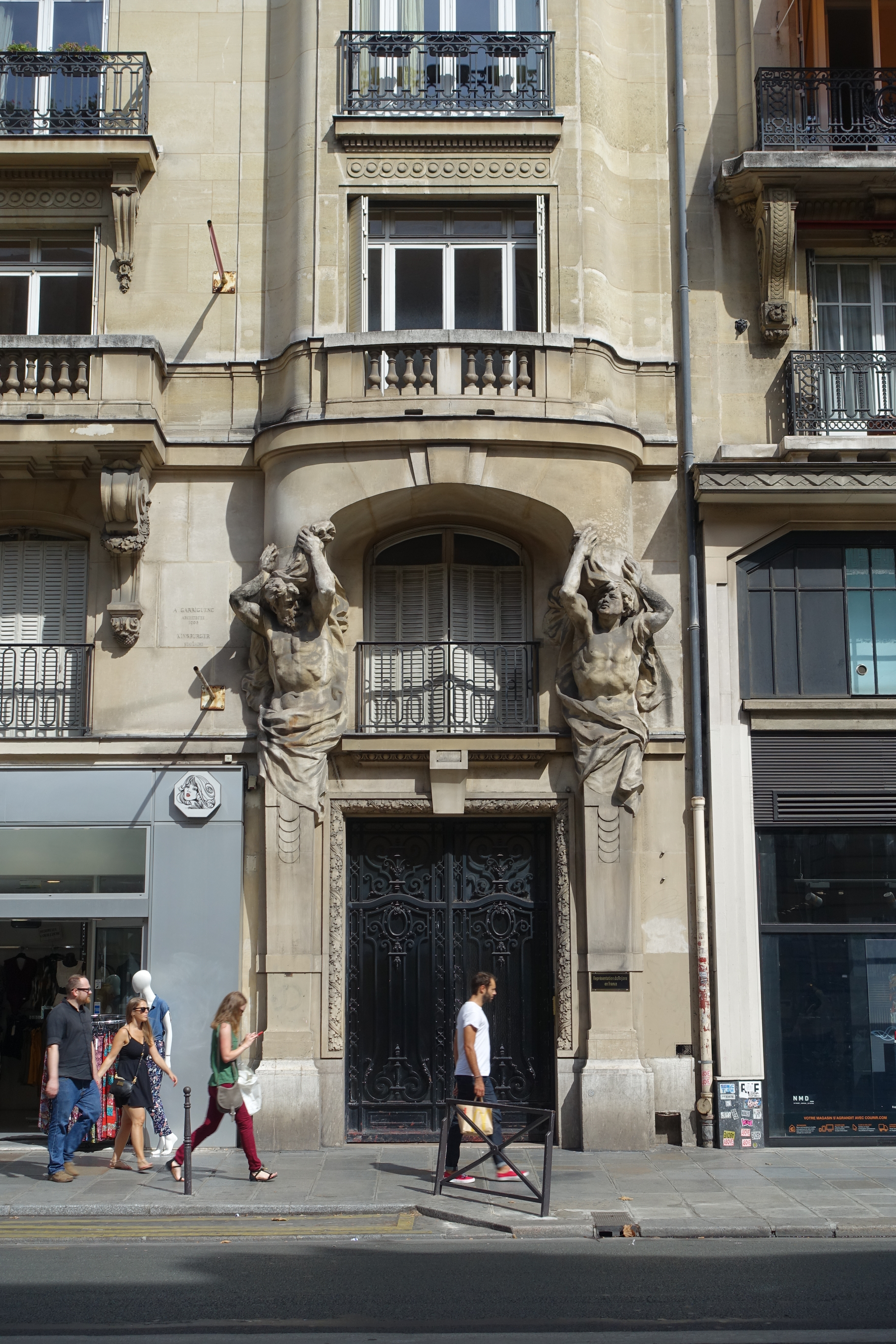
Beaux Arts atlantes of Rue de Rivoli no. 45, Paris, designed by A. Garriguenc, 1905

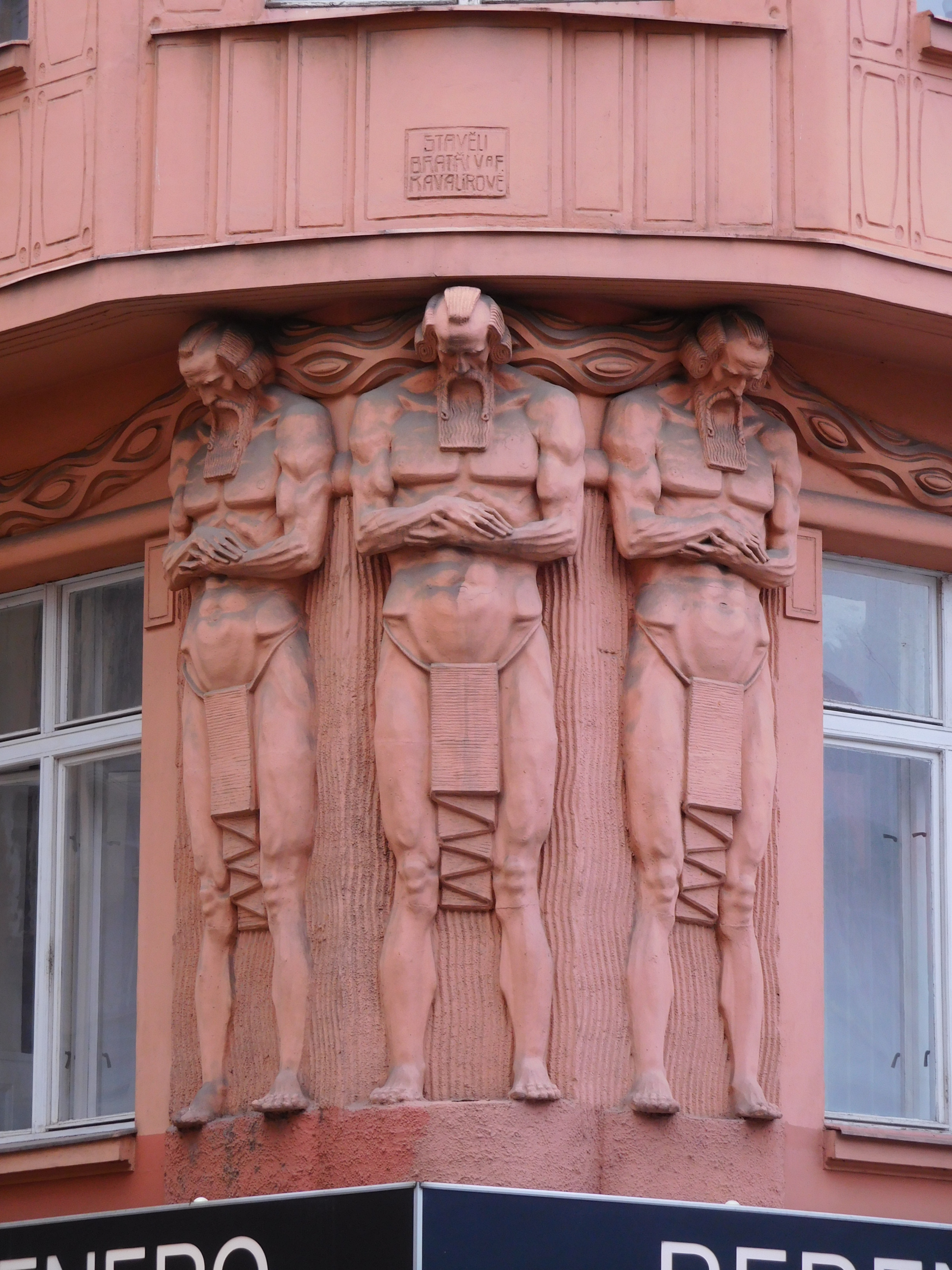
Vienna Secession atlantes on Bílkova Street no. 4, Prague, Czech Republic, holding both a bay window and a stylized festoon with their backs, designed by František Kavalír, 1913

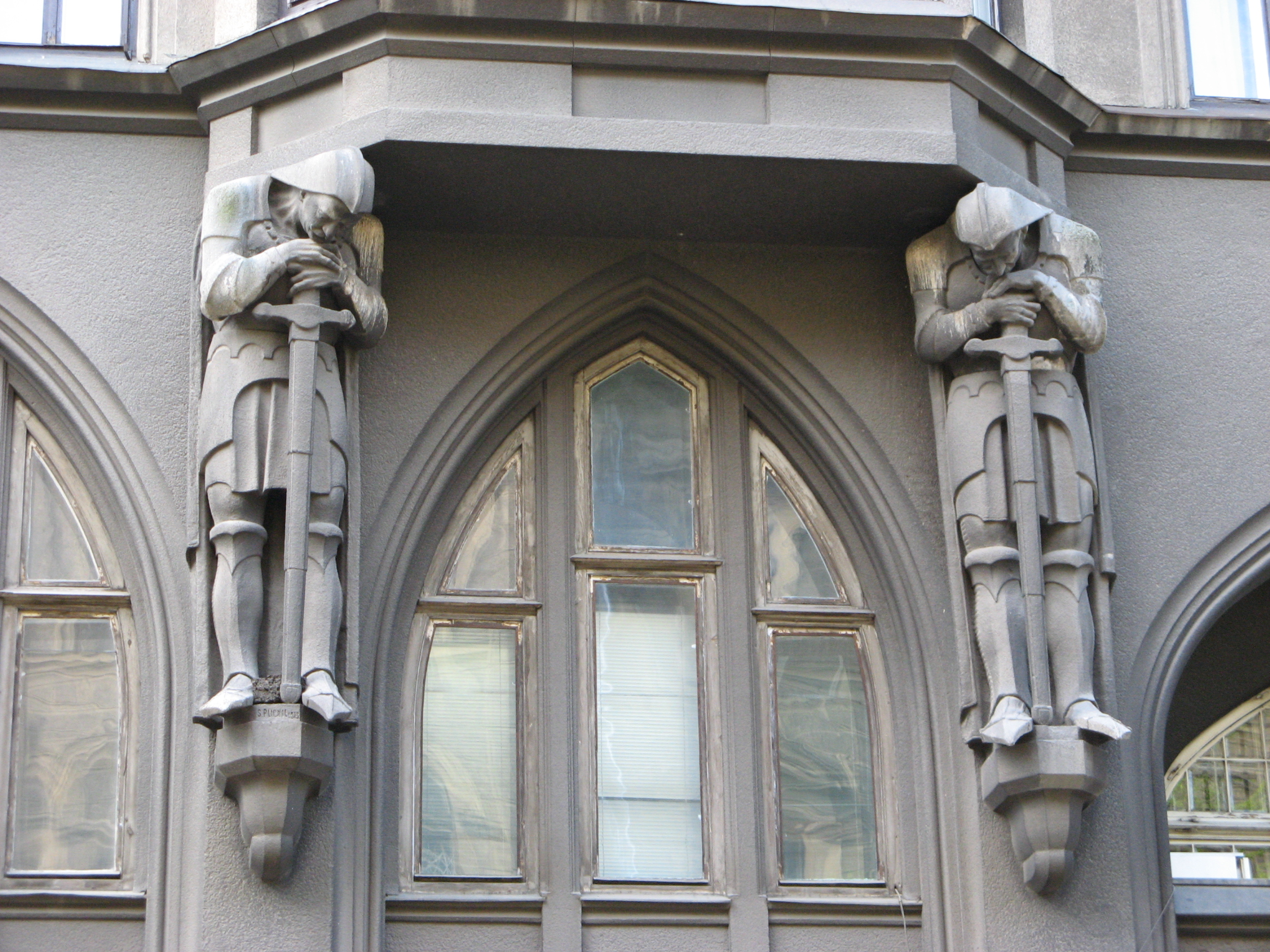
Gothic Revival atlantes on Kniazia Romana Street no. 6, Lviv, Ukraine, designed by Adolf Piller and Roman Völpel, 1912-1913

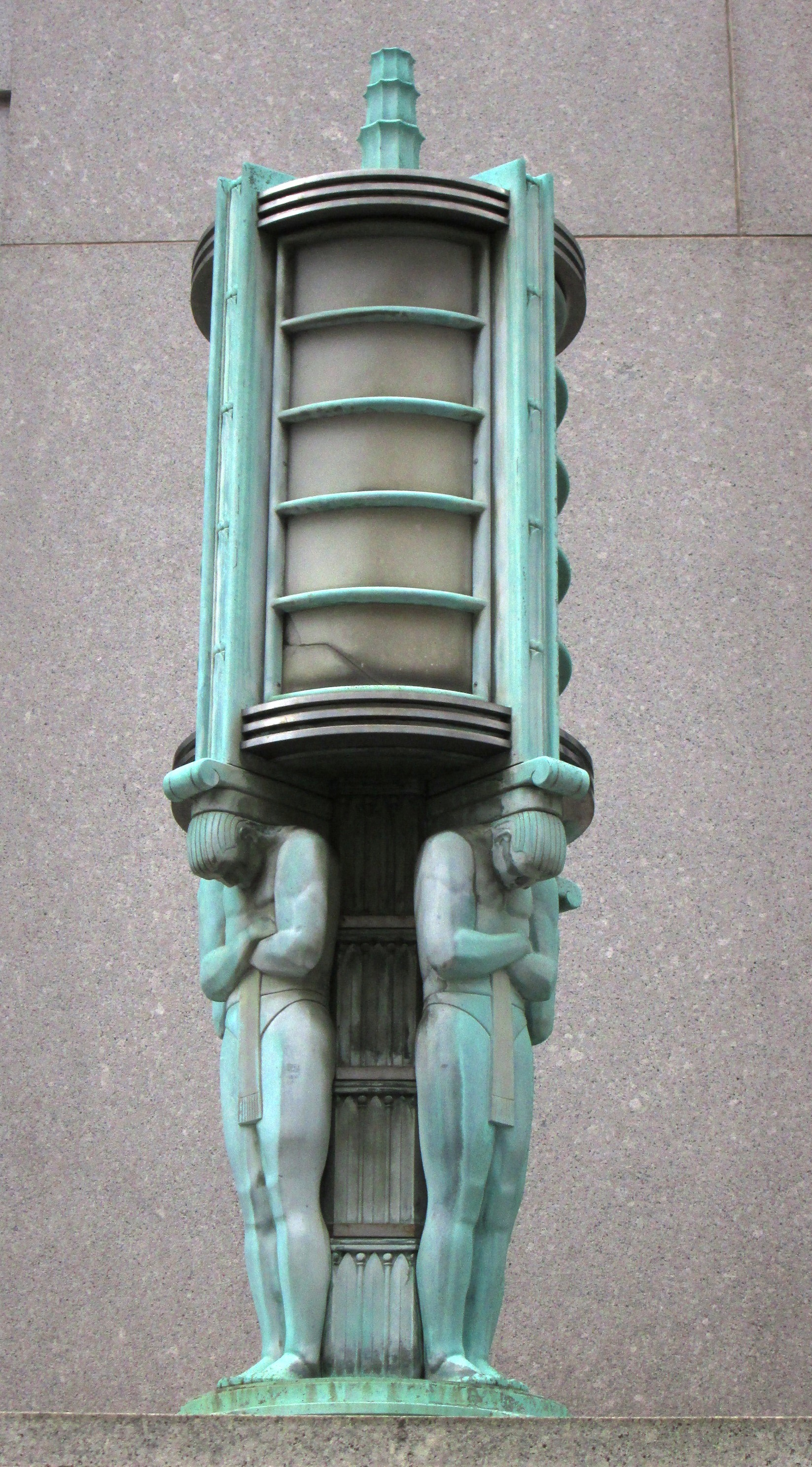
Art Deco atlantes of a torchiere of the Health Department Building, New York City, designed by Oscar Bach, 1932-1935

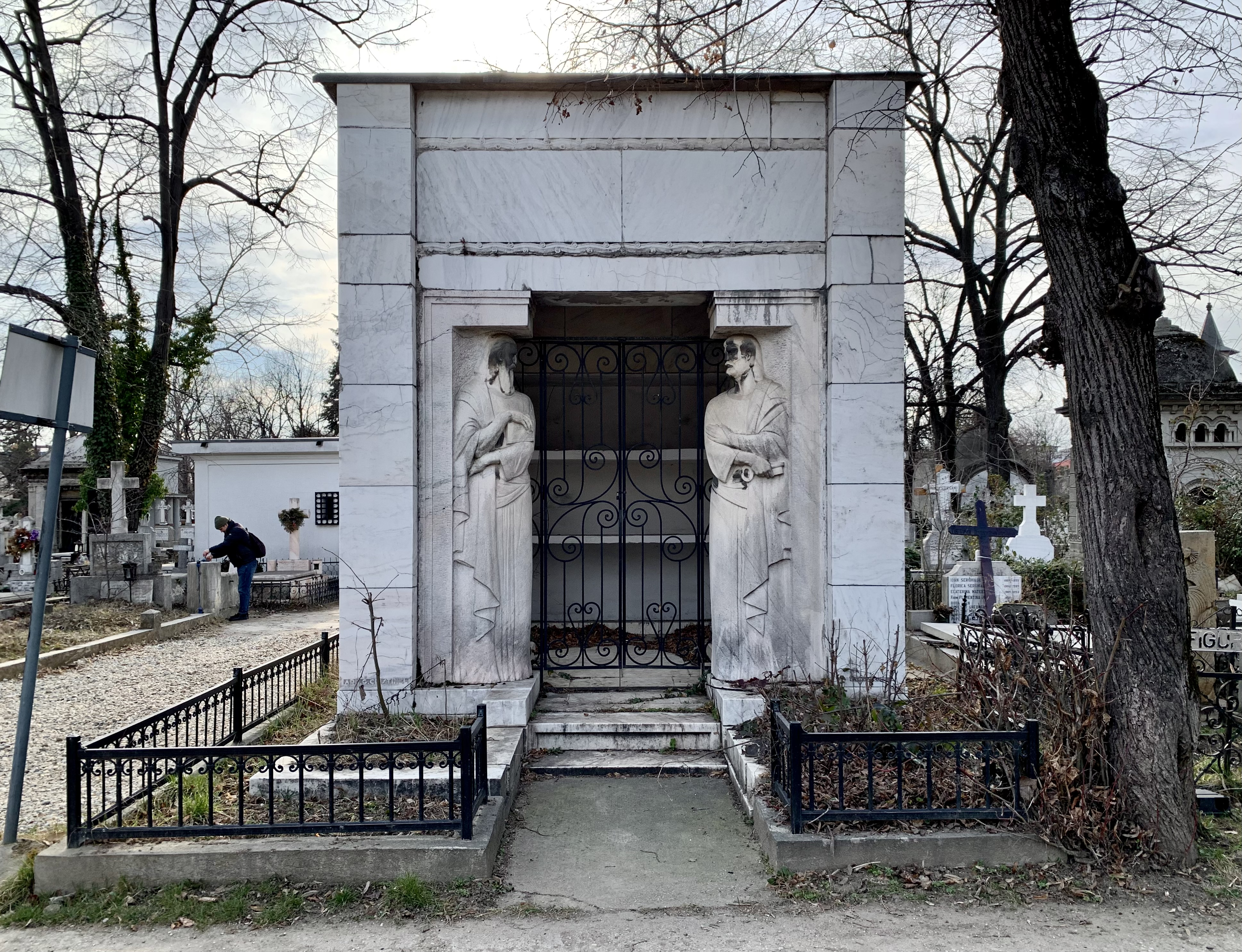
Art Deco atlantes of the Grave of the Străjescu Family in the Bellu Cemetery, Bucharest, Romania, by George Cristinel, 1934

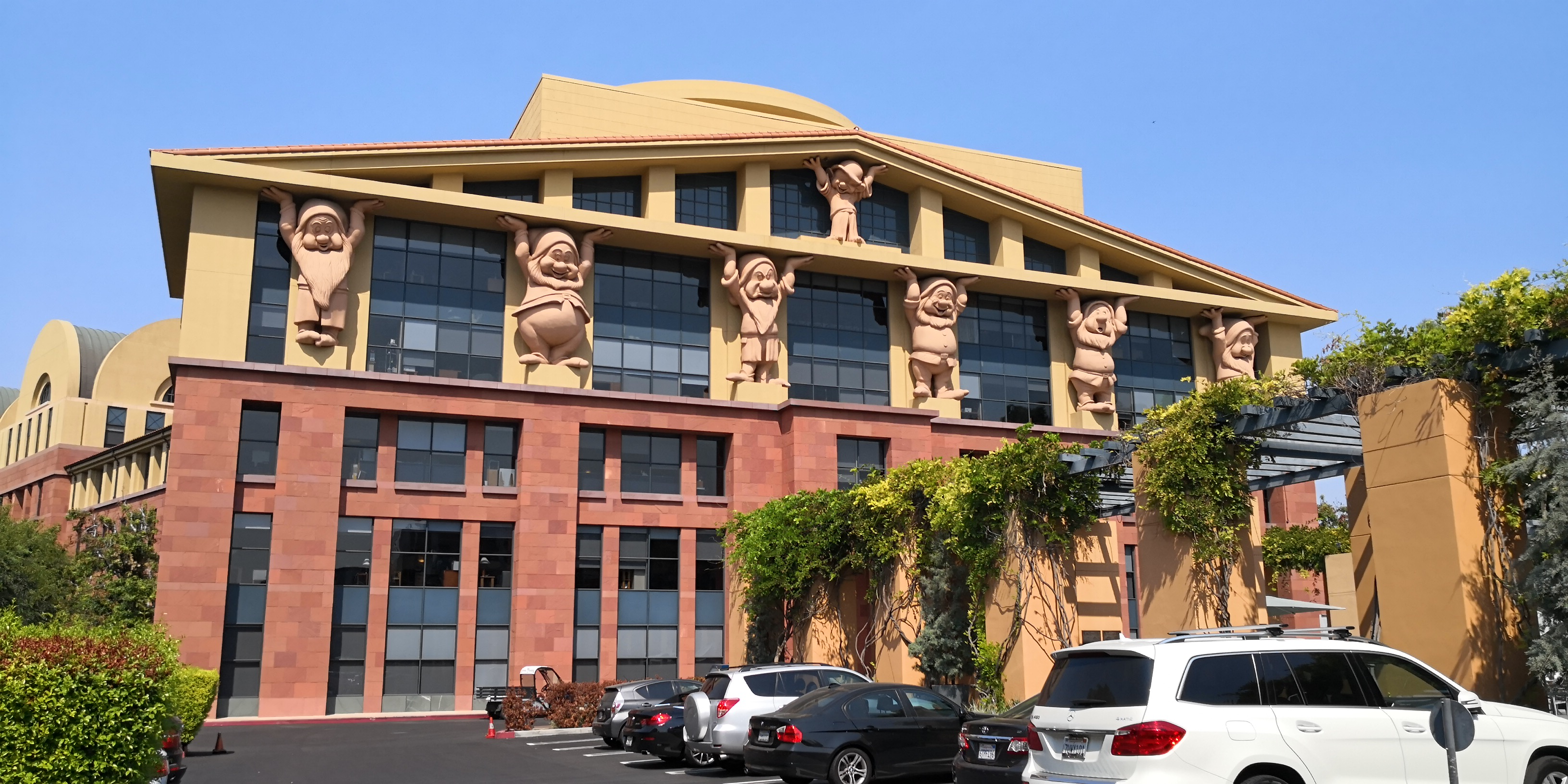
Postmodern Seven Dwarfs atlantes on the Team Disney – The Michael D. Eisner Building, Walt Disney Studios, Burbank, California, by Michael Graves, 1990

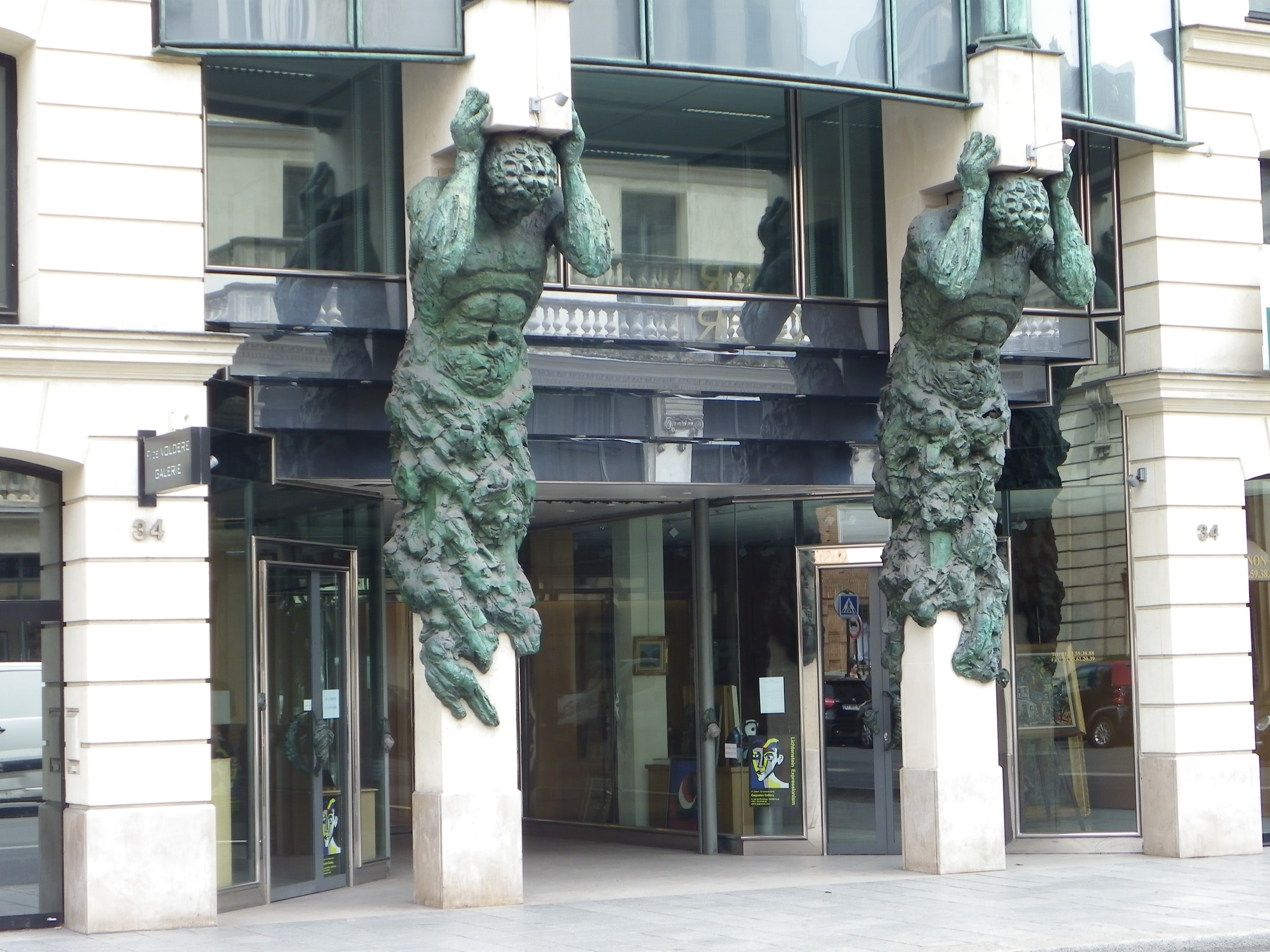
Postmodern atlantes of the Florence de Voldère art gallery (Avenue Matignon no. 34), Paris, by Jean-Jacques Fernier, 1998

== See also ==
- Telamon
