= List of courthouses in the United States =

This is a list of courthouses in the United States. Many American courthouses have hosted historically significant trials, or are significant for their architecture, and thus many have been designated as historic sites.

This list includes state, county, city, town and other municipalities' courthouses, as well as subsuming U.S. Federal courthouses (which are also listed at List of United States federal courthouses). There are no courthouses of international scope located in the U.S.

== County courthouses ==
There exist current or former county courthouses corresponding to the county seats (or shire towns) of most of the United States' 3,144 counties or county-equivalents, and also to a number of former counties.

Variations on county seats include:

- Currently 36 U.S. counties have dual county seats
- Louisiana has parishes and parish seats rather than counties and county seats; this list includes its notable parish courthouses.
- Connecticut no longer has county governments; this list includes its historic county courthouses and also the state's currently functioning courthouses serving 20 geographical areas that do not correspond to the current counties.
- Massachusetts
- Alaska has boroughs and borough-equivalents, and borough seats. It has 39 trial court locations and has appellate courts in Anchorage and Fairbanks.
- Some counties have branch courthouses, including Pinellas County, Florida (county seat Clearwater, branch in St. Petersburg) and Marion County, Missouri (county seat Palmyra for District 1, Hannibal for District 2).

== Alabama ==
Federal courthouses in Alabama are listed here.

County courthouses in Alabama are listed here.

== Alaska ==
Federal courthouses in Alaska are listed here.

Alaska has boroughs and non-borough census areas. Its equivalent to a county seat is a borough seat. It has 39 trial court locations and appellate courts in at least Fairbanks and Anchorage.

Selected non-Federal courthouses in Alaska include:

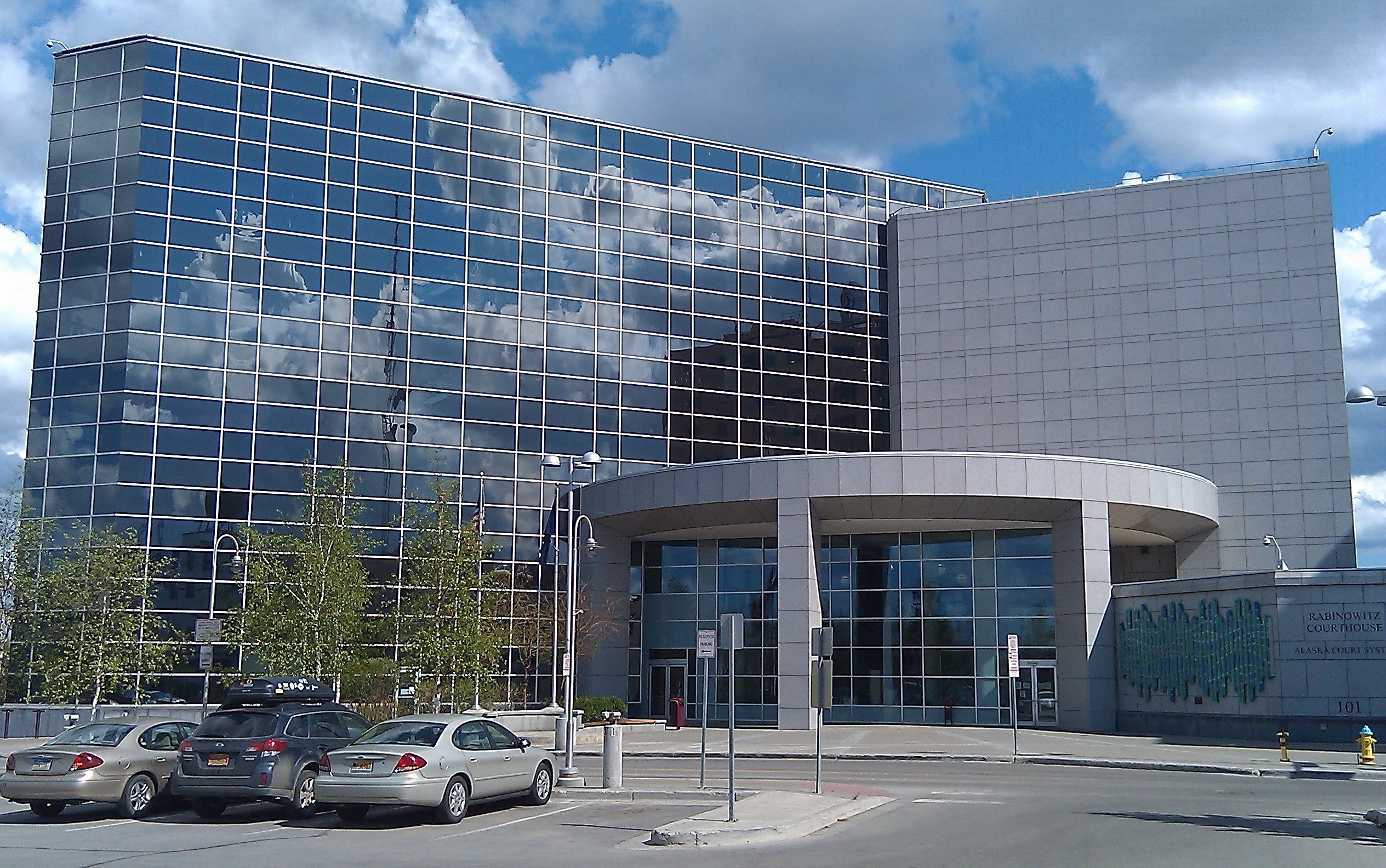
Rabinowitz Courthouse

- Rabinowitz Courthouse, 101 Lacey St., Fairbanks (64.8447°N 147.7178°W), is an Alaska state's Alaska Court of Appeals courthouse and a trial courthouse.
- Chevak Courthouse, 136 Lakeside Rd., Chevak, also serves Fairbanks-North Star
- Nesbett Courthouse, 825 W. 4th St., Anchorage
- Boney Courthouse, 303 K St., Anchorage
- Sitka Courthouse, 304 Lake Street, Sitka
- Valdez Courthouse, 213 Meals Ave., Valdez

== Arizona ==
Federal courthouses in Arizona are listed here.

Notable current and former county courthouses include:

Courthouse	Image	County	Location	Dates	Notes
Tombstone Courthouse State Historic Park		Cochise	Tombstone, Arizona; 31°42′38.99″N 110°4′10.01″W	1882 built 1972 NRHP-listed	Original Cochise County Courthouse.
Gila County Courthouse		Gila	Oak and Broad Sts. Globe; 33°23′46″N 110°47′11″W	1906 built 1975 NRHP	
Graham County Courthouse		Graham	800 Main St., Safford; 32°49′59″N 109°42′57″W	1916 built 1982 NRHP	Classical Revival architecture
Maricopa County Courthouse		Maricopa	125 W. Washington St., Phoenix; 33°26′53″N 112°4′29″W	1988 NRHP	
Mohave County Courthouse and Jail		Mohave	Kingman; 35°11′31″N 114°3′7″W	1915 built 1983 NRHP	Neo-Classical architecture, designed by Lescher & Kibbey.
Navajo County Courthouse		Navajo	Courthouse Sq., Holbrook; 34°54′12″N 110°09′24″W	1978 NRHP	
Pima County Courthouse		Pima	115 N. Church St., Tucson; 32°13′23″N 110°58′21″W	1930 built 1978 NRHP	Mission Revival former courthouse designed by Roy Place.
Second Pinal County Courthouse		Pinal	Pinal and 12th Sts., Florence; 33°1′56″N 111°23′6″W	1891 built 1978 NRHP	Late Victorian-style brick building, replaced as courthouse in 1961, closed in 2005.
Santa Cruz County Courthouse		Santa Cruz	Court Street and Morley Avenue, Nogales; 31°20′11″N 110°56′16″W	1977 NRHP-listed	
Yavapai County Courthouse		Yavapai	Courthouse Sq., Prescott; 34°32′27″N 112°28′06″W	1918 built 1977 NRHP	Greek Revival architecture.
Yuma County Courthouse		Yuma	168 S. 2nd Ave., Yuma; 32°43′26″N 114°37′18″W	1982 NRHP-listed	

== Arkansas ==
Federal courthouses in Arkansas are listed here.

County courthouses in Arkansas are listed here.

== California ==
Federal courthouses in California are listed here.

County courthouses in California are partially listed here.

== Colorado ==
See also the List of county seats in Colorado, the List of National Register of Historic Places in Colorado, and the List of United States federal courthouses in Colorado.

Colorado county courthouses include:

Courthouse	Image	County	Location	Built	Notes
Adams County Courthouse		Adams	22 S. 4th Ave., Brighton; 39°59′11″N 104°49′02″W		NRHP-listed (refnum 6000916).
Alamosa County Courthouse		Alamosa	702 4th St., Alamosa; 37°28′08″N 105°52′02″W		NRHP-listed (refnum 95001149).
Arapahoe County Justice Center		Arapahoe	7325 South Potomac St., Dove Valley; 38°34′58″N 104°49′51″W		
Archuleta County Courthouse		Archuleta	449 San Juan Drive, Pagosa Springs; 37°15′58.41″N 107°00′41.57″W	1929	
Baca County Courthouse		Baca County	741 Main Street, Springfield; 37°24′24″N 102°37′01″W		
Bent County Courthouse and Jail		Bent	725 Carson Ave., Las Animas; 38°3′51″N 103°13′12″W	1887	NRHP-listed (refnum 76000546).
Boulder County Courthouse		Boulder	1300 Pearl St., Boulder; 40°1′5.52″N 105°16′41.16″W	1933	NRHP-listed (refnum 80000878).
Chaffee County Courthouse and Jail Buildings		Chaffee	501 E. Main St., Buena Vista; 38°50′37″N 106°07′37″W		NRHP-listed (refnum 79000575).
Cheyenne County Courthouse		Cheyenne	51 S. 1st St., Cheyenne Wells; 38°49′15″N 102°20′55″W	1908	NRHP-listed (refnum 89000997).
Conejos County Courthouse		Conejos	6883 County Road 13, Conejos; 37°05′20″N 106°01′13″W	1981	
Costilla County Courthouse		Costilla	304 Main Street, San Luis; 37°11′55″N 105°25′34″W	1883	
Crowley County Justice Center		Crowley	110 E. 6th St., Ordway; 38°13′19″N 103°45′22″W	1915	
Custer County Courthouse		Custer	205 South 6th Street, Westcliffe; 38°08′07″N 105°27′34″W	1929	
Delta County Courthouse		Delta	501 Palmer Street, Delta; 38°44′24″N 108°04′21″W	1958	
Old El Paso County Courthouse		El Paso	Colorado Springs	1903	NRHP-listed (refnum 72000272).
Fremont County Judicial Center		Fremont	136 Justice Center Road, Cañon City; 38°26′44″N 105°10′55″W	1999	
Gilpin Combined Court		Gilpin	2960 Dory Hill Road, Black Hawk; 39°50′23″N 105°28′56″W		
Grand County Judicial Center		Grand	307 Moffat Avenue, Hot Sulphur Springs; 40°04′19″N 106°06′14″W		
Gunnison County Courthouse		Gunnison	200 E. Virginia Avenue, Gunnison; 38°32′46″N 106°55′30″W	2015	
Hinsdale County Court House		Hinsdale	317 Henson Street, Lake City; 38°01′44.5″N 107°18′53.06″W	1877	
Huerfano County Courthouse and Jail		Huerfano	400 Main St., Walsenburg; 37°37′29″N 104°46′53″W	1904	NRHP-listed (refnum 73000476).
Kit Carson County Courthouse		Kit Carson	251 16th Street, Burlington; 39°18′10.46″N 102°16′16.38″W	1950	
La Plata County Courthouse		La Plata	1060 East 2nd Avenue, Durango; 37°16′28.4″N 107°52′43.33″W	1964	
Las Animas County Court House		Las Animas	200 East 1st Street, Trinidad; 37°10′07″N 104°30′12″W	1913	
Logan County Courthouse		Logan	Main St., Sterling; 40°37′25″N 103°12′32″W	1910	Designed by John J. Huddart in Classical Revival style. NRHP-listed.
Mineral County Courthouse		Mineral	1201 North Main Street, Creede; 37°51′14″N 106°55′38″W		
Montezuma County Combined Courts		Montezuma	865 North Park Street, Cortez; 37°21′28.21″N 108°34′33.9″W	2017	
Montrose County Courthouse		Montrose	Montrose		NRHP-listed (refnum 94000040).
Morgan County Courthouse and Jail		Morgan	Fort Morgan		NRHP-listed (refnum 2000289).
Ouray County Courthouse		Ouray County	6th Avenue and 4th St., Ouray; 38°1′20.8″N 107°40′10.7″W		Appeared in True Grit.
Park County Courthouse and Jail		Park	418 Main St., Fairplay; 39°13′32″N 106°00′06″W	1874	In 1979 at least, this was the oldest courthouse in Colorado still being used as a courthouse. NRHP-listed.
Phillips County Courthouse		Phillips	Holyoke		NRHP-listed (refnum 7001306).
Pitkin County Courthouse		Pitkin	Aspen; 39°11′25″N 106°49′2″W	1890	NRHP-listed.
Prowers County Courthouse		Prowers County	301 S. Main St., Lamar; 38°5′12″N 102°37′7″W	1928	Classical Revival style. NRHP-listed (refnum 81000186)
Pueblo County Courthouse		Pueblo	10th St. and Main St., Pueblo; 38°16′36″N 104°36′33″W	1908–12	Beaux Arts-style, designed by Albert Ross. NRHP-listed.
Rio Blanco County Justice Center		Rio Blanco	Meeker	2016	
Rio Grande County Courthouse		Rio Grande	965 6th Street, Del Norte; 37°40′37.47″N 106°21′01.13″W	1954	
Saguache County Courthouse		Saguache	501 4th Street, Saguache; 38°5′7.18″N 106°8′14.56″W	1910	
San Miguel County Courthouse		San Miguel	305 West Colorado Avenue, Telluride; 37°56′16.29″N 107°48′46.41″W	1887	
Sedgwick County Courthouse		Sedgwick	Julesburg; 40°59′18″N 102°15′52″W	1938–39	Built as a Works Progress Administration project in the Great Depression. NRHP-listed.
Weld County Courthouse		Weld	9th St. and 9th Ave., Greeley; 40°25′25″N 104°41′33″W		NRHP-listed (refnum 78000886).
Yuma County Courthouse		Yuma	310 Ash Street, Wray; 40°04′44″N 102°13′13″W		
Washington County Courthouse		Washington	150 Ash Avenue, Akron; 40°09′35.5″N 103°12′39.12″W	1910	

== Connecticut ==
Federal courthouses in Connecticut are listed here.

County courthouses include:

Courthouse	Image	County	Location	Built	Notes
Fairfield County Courthouse (Bridgeport)		Fairfield	172 Golden Hill St., Bridgeport; 41°10′50″N 73°11′28″W	1888	Designed by Warren R. Briggs. NRHP-listed (refnum 82004376).
Fairfield County Courthouse (Danbury)		Fairfield	Danbury, Connecticut; 41.3905°N 73.4475°W		Also designed by Warren R. Briggs
New Haven County Courthouse		New Haven	121 Elm Street, New Haven; 41°18′38″N 72°55′27″W	1917	NRHP-listed (refnum 3000404).
New Haven City Hall and County Courthouse		New Haven	161 Church Street, New Haven; 41°18′26″N 72°55′29″W	1861	High Victorian Gothic. NRHP-listed (refnum 75001940).
New London County Courthouse		New London	70 Huntington St., New London; 41°21′18″N 72°6′1″W	1784–86	Oldest courthouse in Connecticut. NRHP-listed (refnum 70000705).
Tolland County Courthouse		Tolland	53 Tolland Green, Tolland	1822	Used as courthouse until 1892, now a museum. NRHP-listed (refnum 9000084).

== Delaware ==
Federal courthouses in Delaware are listed here.

County courthouses include:

Courthouse	Image	County	Location	Built	Notes
New Castle County Court House		New Castle	211 Delaware St., New Castle; 39°39′35″N 75°33′49″W	1730	Georgian-style courthouse, now a museum, that is center of a 12-mile (19 km) circle defining Northern area of the state of Delaware. NRHP-listed.
Old Sussex County Courthouse		Sussex	S. Bedford St., Georgetown; 38°41′23″N 75°23′08″W	1793	Cypress-sheathed. Georgian. NRHP-listed.
Sussex County Courthouse		Sussex	The Circle, Georgetown; 38°41′32″N 75°23′5″W	1837–1840, 1914, 1970	William Strickland-designed Georgian building, NRHP-listed.

== Florida ==
Federal courthouses in Florida are listed here.

County and any other courthouses include:

Courthouse	Image	County	Location	Built	Notes
Old Baker County Courthouse		Baker	Macclenny; 30°16′48″N 82°7′20″W	1908	NRHP-listed (refnum 86001729).
Old Bradford County Courthouse		Bradford	Starke; 29°56′41″N 82°06′40″W	1902	Now part of Santa Fe College. NRHP-listed (refnum 74000611).
Old Brevard County Courthouse		Brevard	Titusville; 28°36′33″N 80°48′33″W	1912	
Old Calhoun County Courthouse		Calhoun	Blountstown; 30°26′35.65″N 85°2′35.39″W	1904	NRHP-listed (refnum 80000943).
Old Citrus County Courthouse		Citrus	Inverness; 28°50′8″N 82°19′49″W	1912	NRHP-listed (refnum 92000340).
Clay County Courthouse		Clay	Green Cove Springs; 29°59′28″N 81°41′6″W	1874	NRHP-listed (refnum 75000546).
Columbia County Courthouse (Florida)		Columbia	Lake City; 30°11′25″N 82°38′8″W	1905	
Dade County Courthouse		Dade	Miami; 25°46′28.74″N 80°11′42.6″W	1928	28 stories high, was the tallest building in Florida. NRHP-listed (refnum 88002983).
Old Hendry County Courthouse		Hendry	LaBelle; 26°45′42″N 81°26′16″W	1926	NRHP-listed (refnum 90001744).
Highlands County Courthouse		Highlands	Sebring; 27°29′33″N 81°26′14″W	1927	NRHP-listed (refnum 89001013).
Indian River County Courthouse		Indian River	Vero Beach		NRHP-listed (refnum 99000768).
Jefferson County Courthouse		Jefferson	Monticello	1909	NRHP-listed (refnum D77000405).
Lake County Courthouse		Lake	Tavares		NRHP-listed (refnum 98001199).
Lee County Courthouse		Lee	Fort Myers		NRHP-listed (refnum 89000196).
Leon County Courthouse		Leon	Tallahassee		NRHP-listed (refnum ?).
Manatee County Courthouse		Manatee	Bradenton	1913	NRHP-listed (refnum 98000676).
Old Manatee County Courthouse		Manatee	Bradenton	1859–60	NRHP-listed (refnum 76000601).
Old Martin County Court House		Martin	Stuart		NRHP-listed (refnum 97001329).
Orange County Courthouse		Orange	Orlando	1997	
Osceola County Courthouse		Osceola	Kissimmee		NRHP-listed (refnum 77000406).
Pasco County Courthouse		Pasco	Dade City		NRHP-listed (refnum 6000843).
Old Pinellas County Courthouse		Pinellas	Clearwater; 27°57′44″N 82°48′3″W	1917	Classical Revival. NRHP-listed (refnum 92000828).
Old Polk County Courthouse		Polk	Bartow; 27°53′48″N 81°50′35″W	1909	NRHP-listed (refnum 89001055).
Putnam County Courthouse		Putnam	Palatka; 29.64747°N 81.63326°W	1927	Classical Revival. Has been extensively renovated.
Sarasota County Courthouse		Sarasota	Sarasota		NRHP-listed (refnum 84003842).
Seminole County Courthouse		Seminole	Sanford	1972	
Suwannee County Courthouse		Suwannee	Live Oak		NRHP-listed (refnum 98001349).
Volusia County Courthouse		Volusia	DeLand; 29°01′44″N 81°18′01″W	2001	
Old Wakulla County Courthouse		Wakulla	Crawfordville		NRHP-listed (refnum 76000607).
Walton County Courthouse (DeFuniak Springs, Florida)		Walton County, Florida	DeFuniak Springs, Florida		Contributing property in DeFuniak Springs Historic District

== Georgia ==
Federal courthouses in Georgia are listed here

County courthouses in Georgia are listed here.

== Hawaii ==
Federal courthouses in Hawaii are listed here.

== Idaho ==
Federal courthouses in Idaho are listed here.

County and any other non-Federal courthouses include:

Courthouse	Image	County	Location	Built	Notes
Adams County Courthouse		Adams	Council; 44°43′47″N 116°25′52″W	1915	Colonial Revival. NRHP-listed (refnum 87001599).
Bear Lake County Courthouse		Bear Lake	Paris; 42.2272°N 111.4006°W	1885	One of Idaho's oldest courthouses. NRHP-listed (refnum 77000454).
Benewah County Courthouse		Benewah	St. Maries	1924	NRHP-listed (refnum 87001580).
Blaine County Courthouse		Blaine	Hailey		NRHP-listed (refnum 78001050).
Bonneville County Courthouse		Bonneville	Idaho Falls	1921	NRHP-listed (refnum 79000781).
Boundary County Courthouse		Boundary	Bonners Ferry	1941	NRHP-listed (refnum 87001581).
Caribou County Courthouse		Caribou	Soda Springs	1919	NRHP-listed (refnum 87001582).
Cassia County Courthouse		Cassia	Burley	1939	NRHP-listed (refnum 87001583).
Elmore County Courthouse		Elmore	Mountain Home	1916	NRHP-listed (refnum 87001584).
Franklin County Courthouse		Franklin	Preston	1939	NRHP-listed (refnum 87001585).
Fremont County Courthouse		Fremont	St. Anthony	1909	NRHP-listed (refnum 79000789).
Gem County Courthouse		Gem	Emmett	1938 (current building)	NRHP-listed (refnum 82000347).
Jefferson County Courthouse		Jefferson	Rigby		NRHP-listed (refnum 87001586). Demolished in 2016
Jerome County Courthouse		Jerome	Jerome	1938	NRHP-listed (refnum 87001600).
Kootenai County Courthouse		Kootenai	Coeur d'Alene	1925-1926	NRHP-listed (refnum 77000462).
Latah County Courthouse		Latah	Moscow	1911	Currently serves as Moscow City Hall. NRHP-listed (refnum 73000686)
Lemhi County Courthouse		Lemhi	Salmon	1909-1910	NRHP-listed (refnum 78001078).
Madison County Courthouse		Madison	Rexburg		NRHP-listed (refnum 87001587).
Oneida County Courthouse		Oneida	Malad	1920	NRHP-listed (refnum 87001588).
Owyhee County Courthouse		Owyhee	Murphy	1936	NRHP-listed (refnum 82000357).
Teton County Courthouse		Teton	Driggs	1924	NRHP-listed (refnum 87001589).
Washington County Courthouse		Washington	Weiser	1939	NRHP-listed (refnum 87001602).

== Illinois ==
Federal courthouses in Illinois are listed here.

For current county courthouses, including some that are historic, see List of county courthouses in Illinois#Current. For former county courthouses that are notable, see List of county courthouses in Illinois#Former.

== Indiana ==
Federal courthouses in Indiana are listed here.

County and any other courthouses include:

Courthouse	Image	County	Location	Built	Notes
Adams County Courthouse		Adams	Decatur; 40°49′47″N 84°55′29″W	1872–73	Second Empire style. NRHP-listed (refnum 8000914).
Allen County Courthouse		Allen	Fort Wayne; 41°4′47″N 85°8′21″W	1902	Beaux-Arts style. A National Historic Landmark, and NRHP-listed (refnum 76000031).
Bartholomew County Courthouse		Bartholomew	Columbus; 39°12′4″N 85°55′17″W	1871–1874	Second Empire, designed by Issac Hodgson. NRHP-listed (refnum 79000031).
Benton County Courthouse		Benton	Fowler; 40°37′2″N 87°18′57″W	1874	Second Empire, designed by Gurdon P. Randall. NRHP-listed (refnum 8000741).
Blackford County Courthouse		Blackford	Hartford City; 40°27′6″N 85°22′5″W	1894	Richardsonian Romanesque. NRHP-listed (refnum 80000053) and included in Hartford City Courthouse Square Historic District
Boone County Courthouse		Boone	Lebanon; 40°2′52″N 86°28′7″W	1909–11	Classical Revival. NRHP-listed (refnum 86002703).
Brown County Courthouse Historic District		Brown	Nashville	1873-1874	NRHP-listed (refnum 83000050).
Carroll County Courthouse		Carroll	Delphi	1916 (current building)	NRHP-listed (refnum 3001317).
Clay County Courthouse		Clay	Brazil	1914	NRHP-listed (refnum 99001109).
Clinton County Courthouse		Clinton	Frankfort	1882	NRHP-listed (refnum 78000027).
Daviess County Courthouse		Daviess	Washington	1927-1928	NRHP-listed (refnum 8000916).
Dearborn County Courthouse		Dearborn	Lawrenceburg	1870-1871	NRHP-listed (refnum 81000008).
Decatur County Courthouse		Decatur	Greensburg	1854	NRHP-listed (refnum 73000014).
Dubois County Courthouse		Dubois	Jasper	1909-1911	NRHP-listed (refnum 95001538).
Elkhart County Courthouse		Elkhart	Goshen	1860-1868	NRHP-listed (refnum 80000034).
Fayette County Courthouse		Fayette	Connersville	1890	NRHP-listed (refnum 6000518).
Fountain County Courthouse		Fountain	Covington		NRHP-listed (refnum 8000191).
Fulton County Courthouse		Fulton	Rochester	1937	NRHP-listed (refnum 1138).
Gibson County Courthouse		Gibson	Princeton	1883	NRHP-listed (refnum 84001038).
Greene County Courthouse		Greene	Bloomfield	1885-1886	NRHP-listed (refnum 8000912).
Hamilton County Courthouse (Indiana)		County	Noblesville	1875-1876	NRHP-listed (refnum 78000033).
Henry County Courthouse		Henry	New Castle	1866	NRHP-listed (refnum 81000013).
Jasper County Courthouse		Jasper	Rensselaer	1898	NRHP-listed (refnum 83000126).
Jay County Courthouse		Jay	Portland	1915-1919	NRHP-listed (refnum 81000016).
Johnson County Courthouse Square		Johnson	Franklin	1879-1881	NRHP-listed (refnum 81000017).
La Grange County Courthouse		La Grange	LaGrange; 41°38′40″N 85°25′7″W	1878–79	NRHP-listed (refnum 80000042).
Lake County Courthouse		Lake	Crown Point	1878-1880	NRHP-listed (refnum 73000073).
Marshall County Court House		County	Plymouth	1870-1882	NRHP-listed (refnum).
Martin County Courthouse		Martin	Shoals	1876	NRHP-listed (refnum 5000604).
Miami County Courthouse		Miami	Peru		NRHP-listed (refnum 8000194).
Monroe County Courthouse		Monroe	Bloomington	1908	NRHP-listed (refnum 76000012).
Morgan County Courthouse		Morgan	Martinsville		NRHP-listed (refnum 95001531).
Newton County Courthouse		Newton	Kentland	1906	NRHP-listed (refnum 8000742).
Noble County Courthouse		Noble	Albion	1887	NRHP-listed (refnum 81000005).
Orange County Courthouse		Orange	Paoli	1847	NRHP-listed (refnum 75000009).
Owen County Courthouse		Owen	Spencer	1910-1911	NRHP-listed (refnum 94001351).
Old Perry County Courthouse		Perry	Rome	1818	NRHP-listed (refnum 81000006).
Pike County Courthouse		Pike	Petersburg	1922	NRHP-listed (refnum 8000913).
Posey County Courthouse Square		County	Mount Vernon	1874-1876	NRHP-listed (refnum 88003042).
Pulaski County Courthouse		Pulaski	Winamac	1894-1895	NRHP-listed (refnum 7001282).
Ripley County Courthouse (Indiana)		Ripley	Versailles	1860-1863	NRHP-listed (refnum 9000762).
Rush County Courthouse		Rush	Rushville	1896	NRHP-listed (refnum 75000048).
Old Courthouse (Second St. Joseph County Courthouse)		St. Joseph	South Bend	1853	NRHP-listed (refnum 70000007).
Third St. Joseph County Courthouse		St. Joseph	South Bend; 41°40′33″N 86°15′8″W	1897	NRHP-listed (refnum 85001230).
Spencer County Courthouse		Spencer	Rockport; 37°52′57″N 87°2′47″W	1921	NRHP-listed (refnum 99000304).
Starke County Courthouse		Starke	Knox	1887	NRHP-listed (refnum 86003170).
Steuben County Courthouse		Steuben	Angola	1867-1868	NRHP-listed (refnum 75000051).
Sullivan County Courthouse		Sullivan	Sullivan	1926-1928	NRHP-listed (refnum 8001213).
Switzerland County Courthouse		Switzerland	Vevay		NRHP-listed (refnum 9000435).
Tippecanoe County Courthouse		Tippecanoe	Lafayette	1881-1882	NRHP-listed (refnum 72000013).
Tipton County Courthouse		Tipton	Tipton		NRHP-listed (refnum 84001665).
Union County Courthouse		Union	Liberty		NRHP-listed (refnum 87000103).
Old Vanderburgh County Courthouse		Vanderburgh	Evansville		NRHP-listed (refnum 70000010).
Vermillion County Courthouse		Vermillion	Newport	1923-1925	NRHP-listed (refnum 7001283).
Vigo County Courthouse		Vigo	Terre Haute		NRHP-listed (refnum 83000160).
Warren County Courthouse		Warren	Williamsport		NRHP-listed (refnum 8000195).
Washington County Courthouse		Washington	Salem	1908	NRHP-listed (refnum 80000047).
Wayne County Courthouse		Wayne	Richmond	1893	NRHP-listed (refnum 78000042).
Wells County Courthouse		Wells	Bluffton	1889	NRHP-listed (refnum 79000028).
Whitley County Courthouse		Whitley	Columbia City	1888	NRHP-listed (refnum 79000029).

== Iowa ==
Federal courthouses in Iowa are listed here.

County courthouses in Iowa are listed here.

== Kansas ==
Federal courthouses in Kansas are listed here.

County courthouses in Kansas are listed here.

== Kentucky ==
Federal courthouses in Kentucky are listed here.

However, the Old U.S. Customshouse and Post Office and Fireproof Storage Company Warehouse, in Louisville, Kentucky, also served as a Federal district courthouse.

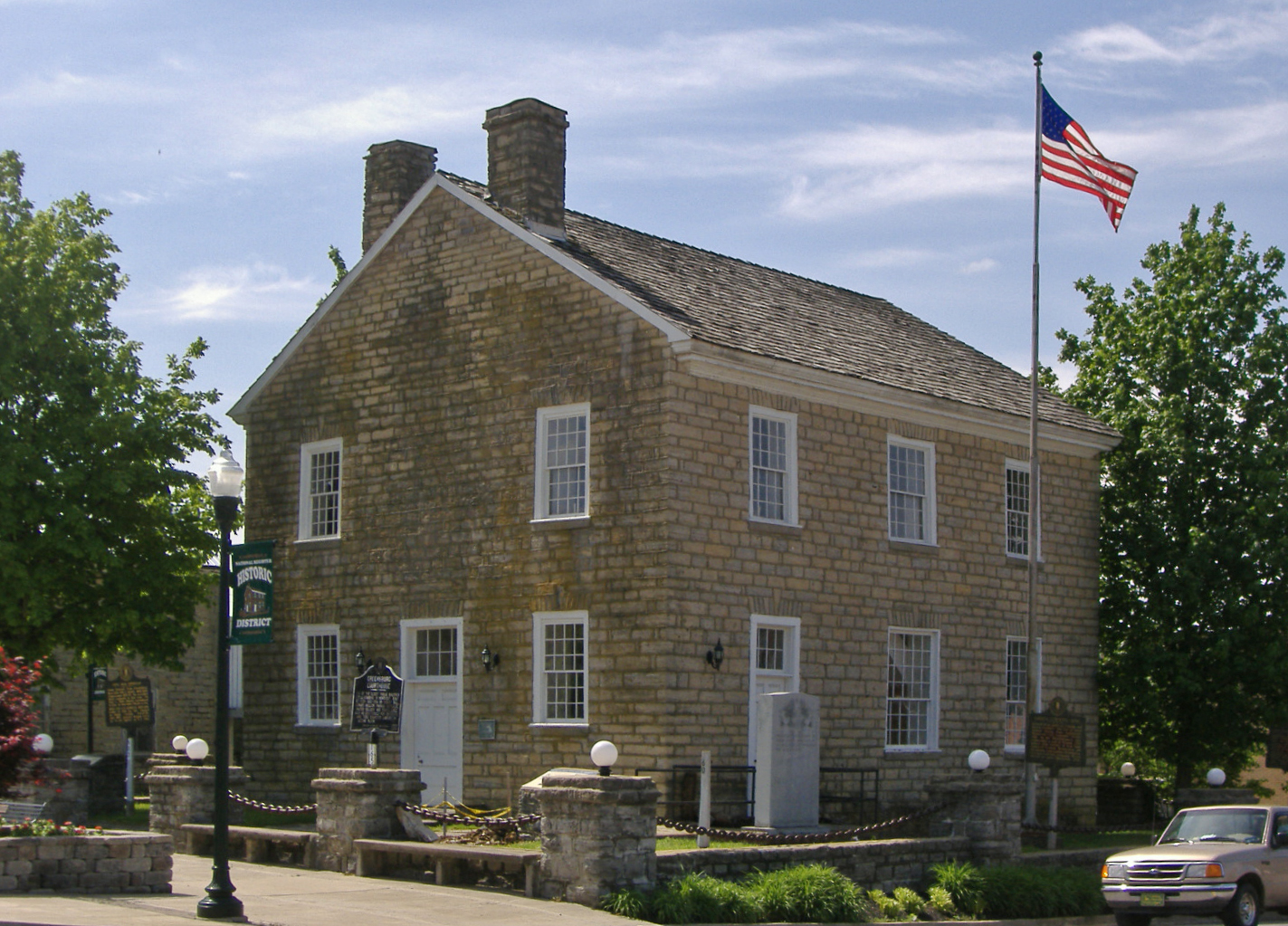
Old Courthouse, Greensburg, KY

The "Old Courthouse", or "Greensburg Courthouse" in Greensburg, Kentucky, built during 1802–04, is the oldest courthouse west of the Alleghenies. Future Kentucky governor Thomas Metcalfe was one of the builders. It is included in the Downtown Greensburg Historic District.

County courthouses include:

Courthouse	Image	County	Location	Built	Notes
Adair County Courthouse		Adair	Columbia; 37.102778°N 85.306111°W		NRHP-listed (refnum 74000847).
Ballard County Courthouse		Ballard	Wickliffe; 36.965278°N 89.088611°W	1900–1905	First permanent courthouse in the county. NRHP-listed (refnum 80001480).
Barren County Courthouse		Barren	Glasgow; 36.995844°N 85.912562°W		Glasgow Central Business District. NRHP-listed (refnum 93000051).
Bourbon County Courthouse		Bourbon	Paris; 38.213333°N 84.25°W		NRHP-listed (refnum 74000851).
Boyle County Courthouse		Boyle	Danville; 37°38′47″N 84°46′24″W	1862	Replaced courthouse destroyed in 1860 fire. Was immediately commandeered to serve as a hospital following the Battle of Perryville.
Calloway County Courthouse		Calloway	Murray		NRHP-listed (refnum 86000287).
Campbell County Courthouse		Campbell	Alexandria; 38.9597°N 84.3867°W		
Campbell County Courthouse		Campbell	Newport; 39.0922°N 84.4970°W		NRHP-listed (refnum 88000181).
Carroll County Courthouse		Carroll	Carrollton, Kentucky		Designed by McDonald Brothers. Included in NRHP-listed Carrollton Historic District
Casey County Courthouse		Casey	Liberty		NRHP-listed (refnum 77000607).
Clark County Courthouse		Clark	Winchester		NRHP-listed (refnum 74000858).
Fulton County Courthouse		Fulton	Hickman		NRHP-listed (refnum 76000887).
Franklin County Courthouse		Franklin	Frankfort		Included in NRHP-listed Frankfort Commercial Historic District.
Garrard County Courthouse		Garrard	Lancaster		Included in NRHP-listed Lancaster Commercial Historic District
Graves County Courthouse		Graves	Mayfield		Included in NRHP-listed Mayfield Downtown Commercial District
Grayson County Courthouse		Grayson	Leitchfield		Included in NRHP-listed Court Square Historic District
Hancock County Courthouse		Hancock	Hawesville		NRHP-listed (refnum 75000765).
Elizabethtown Courthouse Square and Commercial District		Hardin	Elizabethtown		NRHP-listed (refnum).
Harrison County Courthouse		Harrison	Cynthiana		NRHP-listed (refnum 74000880).
Hart County Courthouse		Hart	Munfordville		NRHP-listed (refnum 80001542).
Henry County Courthouse, Jail, and Warden's House		Henry	New Castle		NRHP-listed (refnum 77000621).
Hickman County Courthouse		Hickman	Clinton		NRHP-listed (refnum 75000767).
Jefferson County Courthouse		Jefferson	Louisville		NRHP-listed (refnum 72000537).
Jefferson County Courthouse Annex		Jefferson	Louisville		NRHP-listed (refnum 80001607).
Knox County Courthouse		Knox	Barbourville		Contributing building in Barbourville Commercial District.
Lincoln County Courthouse		Lincoln	Stanford		NRHP-listed (refnum 76000915).
Logan County Courthouse		Logan	Russellville	1904	Part of Russellville Historic District. NRHP-listed (refnum 76000919).
Madison County Courthouse		Madison	Richmond		NRHP-listed (refnum 75000800).
Marion County Courthouse		Marion	Lebanon		Contributing building in NRHP-listed Lebanon Historic Commercial District
Martin County Courthouse		Martin	Inez		NRHP-listed (refnum 6000811).
Metcalfe County Kentucky Courthouse		Metcalfe	Edmonton; 36°58′45″N 85°36′41″W		Built 1868–69, NRHP-listed.
Morgan County Courthouse		Morgan	West Liberty		NRHP-listed (refnum 76000929).
Muhlenberg County Courthouse		Muhlenberg	Greenville		NRHP-listed (refnum 78001390).
Ohio County Courthouse		Ohio	Hartford		Built during 1940–43. Contributing building in Downtown Hartford Historic District.
Owen County Courthouse and Jail		Owen	Owenton		NRHP-listed (refnum 76000937).
Robertson County Courthouse		Robertson	Mount Olivet		NRHP-listed (refnum 78001394).
Rowan County Courthouse		Rowan	Morehead		NRHP-listed (refnum 83002862).
Scott County Courthouse		Scott	Georgetown		NRHP-listed (refnum 72000542).
Shelby County Courthouse and Main Street Commercial District		Shelby	Shelbyville		NRHP-listed (refnum 78001399).
Shelby County Courthouse and Main Street Commercial District (Boundary Increase)		Shelby	Shelbyville		NRHP-listed (refnum 85000864).
Simpson County Courthouse		Simpson	Franklin		NRHP-listed (refnum 80001668).
Todd County Courthouse		Todd	Elkton		NRHP-listed (refnum 75000836).
Union County Courthouse		Union	Morganfield		NRHP-listed (refnum 78001401).
Warren County Courthouse		Warren	Bowling Green		NRHP-listed (refnum 77000657).
Washington County Courthouse		Washington	Springfield		NRHP-listed (refnum 77000660).
Webster County Courthouse		Webster	Dixon		NRHP-listed (refnum 91000924).

== Louisiana ==
Federal courthouses in Louisiana are listed here.

Parish and other courthouses include:

Courthouse name	Image	County	Location	Built	Notes
Allen Parish Courthouse		Allen	Oberlin; 30°37′13″N 92°46′04″W		NRHP-listed (refnum 81000287).
Assumption Parish Courthouse and Jail		Assumption	Napoleonville; 29°56′28″N 91°01′28″W		NRHP-listed (refnum 97000057).
Avoyelles Parish Courthouse		Avoyelles	Marksville	1927	NRHP CP
Beauregard Parish Courthouse		Beauregard	DeRidder; 30°50′46″N 93°17′20″W	1915	Beaux-Arts. NRHP-listed (refnum 83000490).
Calcasieu Parish Courthouse		Calcasieu	Lake Charles		NRHP-listed (refnum 89001938).
Catahoula Parish Courthouse		Catahoula	Harrisonburg		NRHP-listed (refnum 88002056).
Claiborne Parish Courthouse		Claiborne	Homer		NRHP-listed (refnum 81000291).
Concordia Parish Courthouse		Concordia	Vidalia; 31°34′4″N 91°25′42″W	1939	Four-story Art Deco courthouse built in "new" Vidalia after town was moved as part of a Mississippi River flood control project. NRHP-listed.
DeSoto Parish Courthouse		DeSoto	Mansfield		NRHP-listed (refnum 86003677).
East Carroll Parish Courthouse		East Carroll Parish	Lake Providence; 32°48′12″N 91°10′24″W		The new building and the Old East Carroll Parish Courthouse building, built in 1935 and 1879, are both contributing buildings in NRHP-listed Old Courthouse Square.
East Feliciana Parish Courthouse		East Feliciana	Clinton		NRHP-listed (refnum 73002232).
Iberville Parish Courthouse		Iberville	Plaquemine	1848	NRHP-listed (refnum 80001732).
Old Jefferson Parish Courthouse		Jefferson	Gretna		NRHP-listed (refnum 83000512).
Lafourche Parish Courthouse		Lafourche	Thibodaux		NRHP-listed (refnum 79001068).
Livingston Parish Courthouse, Old		Livingston	Springfield		NRHP-listed (refnum 89001040).
Madison Parish Courthouse		Madison	Tallulah		NRHP-listed (refnum 89000044).
Morehouse Parish Courthouse		Morehouse	Bastrop		NRHP-listed (refnum 2001622).
Pointe Coupee Parish Courthouse		Point Coupee	New Roads		NRHP-listed (refnum 81000710).
St. Landry Parish Courthouse		St. Landry	Opelousas; 30.53370°N 92.08338°W		Art Deco building constructed in 1939, contributing in the Opelousas Historic District
St. Martin Parish Courthouse		St. Martin	St. Martinville |		NRHP-listed (refnum 81000658).
St. Tammany Parish Courthouse		St. Tammany	Covington vicinity		Built 1818–19, its brick masonry building was converted into the Claiborne Cottage Hotel in 1880. NRHP-listed in 2019.
Tensas Parish Courthouse		Tensas	St. Joseph		NRHP-listed (refnum 79001093).
Vernon Parish Courthouse		Vernon	Leesville		NRHP-listed (refnum 83000550).

== Maine ==
Federal courthouses in Maine are listed here.

Maine's Superior Court holds court in each of Maine's 16 counties, and Aroostook County has two Superior Courts.

District court operates at many locations.

County courthouses and any other courthouses include:

Courthouse	Image	County	Location	Built	Notes
Androscoggin County Courthouse and Jail		Androscoggin	Auburn; 44°5′52″N 70°13′38″W	1857	NRHP-listed (refnum 83003633).
Aroostook County Courthouse and Jail		Aroostook	Houlton; 46°7′29″N 67°50′22″W	1859	Part of a rambling complex, whose original portion was designed by Gridley J. F. Bryant. Addition in 1895 designed by Wilfred E. Mansur moved the cupola to the new center of the building. NRHP-listed (refnum 89002340).
Franklin County Courthouse		Franklin	Farmington		NRHP-listed (refnum 83003641).
Kennebec County Courthouse		Kennebec	Augusta		NRHP-listed (refnum 74000169).
Knox County Courthouse		Knox	Rockland		NRHP-listed (refnum 77000075).
Pownalborough Courthouse		Lincoln	Dresden; 44°6′19″N 69°45′59″W	1761	Lincoln County's first courthouse, and the oldest surviving courthouse in Maine. NRHP-listed (refnum 70000052).
Lincoln County Courthouse		Lincoln	Wiscasset	1824	Contributing building in NRHP-listed Wiscasset Historic District
Somerset County Courthouse		Somerset	Skowhegan		NRHP-listed (refnum 84000332).
Washington County Courthouse		Washington	Machias		NRHP-listed (refnum 76000119).

== Maryland ==
Federal courthouses in Maryland are listed here.

County and other courthouses include:

Courthouse name	Image	County	Location	Built	Notes
Baltimore County Courthouse		Baltimore	Towson; 39°23′59″N 76°36′24″W	1855	NRHP-listed (refnum 72000569).
Dorchester County Courthouse and Jail		Dorchester	Cambridge; 38°34′18″N 76°4′34″W	1853	Designed by Richard Upjohn. NRHP-listed (refnum 82001591).
Garrett County Courthouse		Garrett	Oakland		NRHP-listed (refnum 75000899).
Montgomery County Courthouse Historic District		Montgomery	Rockville		NRHP-listed (refnum 86003352).
Washington County Courthouse		Washington	Hagerstown		NRHP-listed (refnum 74000976).

== Massachusetts ==
Federal courthouses in Massachusetts are listed here.

Courthouses in Boston are listed here.

County and other courthouses include:

Courthouse	Image	County	Location	Built	Notes
Barnstable County Courthouse		Barnstable	Barnstable; 41°42′5″N 70°18′17″W	1831	NRHP-listed (refnum 81000104).
Berkshire County Courthouse		Berkshire	Pittsfield; 42°26′51.137″N 73°15′9.032″W	1871	In NRHP-listed Park Square Historic District (refnum 91001826).
Bristol County Superior Courthouse		Bristol	Taunton		In NRHP-listed Bristol County Courthouse Complex (refnum 78000427).
Dedham District Court		Norfolk	Dedham	1938	
First District Courthouse		Bristol	Taunton		In NRHP-listed Bristol County Courthouse Complex (refnum 78000427).
Hampden County Courthouse		Hampden	Springfield; 42°6′1″N 72°35′20″W	1871	Designed by Henry Hobson Richardson. NRHP-listed (refnum 72000134).
Norfolk County Courthouse		Norfolk	Dedham	1827	NRHP-listed (refnum 72001312).
Old County Courthouse		Plymouth	Plymouth; 41°57′20″N 70°39′53″W	1749	Oldest wooden courthouse in the U.S.(?) NRHP-listed (refnum 72001297).
Suffolk County Courthouse		Suffolk	Boston; 42°21′32.75″N 71°3′40.5″W		NRHP-listed (refnum 74000391).

== Michigan ==
Federal courthouses in Michigan are listed here.

County and other courthouses include:

Courthouse	Image	County	Location	Built	Notes
Alpena County Courthouse		Alpena	Alpena; 45°4′5″N 83°26′30″W	1934	Art Deco. NRHP-listed (refnum 83003643).
Antrim County Courthouse		Antrim	Bellaire; 44°58′33″N 85°12′29″W	1904	NRHP-listed (refnum 80001846).
Second Arenac County Courthouse		Arenac	Omer; 44°2′50″N 83°51′14″W	1890	Built at cost of $2970.75, this served as a courthouse only briefly: in 1891 a vote moved the county seat to Standish. Sold to local Masonic group for $500 in 1893. Also known as "Omer Masonic Hall". NRHP-listed (refnum 82002823).
Barry County Courthouse Complex		Barry	Hastings		NRHP-listed (refnum 81000303).
Benzie County Courthouse		Benzie	Beulah		NRHP-listed (refnum 96000611).
Cheboygan County Courthouse		Cheboygan	Cheboygan		NRHP-listed (refnum 86001010).
Chippewa County Courthouse		Chippewa	Sault Ste. Marie		NRHP-listed (refnum 84001381).
Dickinson County Courthouse and Jail		Dickinson	Iron Mountain		NRHP-listed (refnum 80001852).
Eaton County Courthouse		Eaton	Charlotte		NRHP-listed (refnum 71000389)(refnum 93000712-boundary increase).
Genesee County Courthouse and Jail		Genesee	Flint		NRHP-listed (refnum 90000798).
Gogebic County Courthouse		Gogebic	Bessemer		NRHP-listed (refnum 81000306).
Gratiot County Courthouse		Gratiot	Ithaca		NRHP-listed (refnum 76002291).
Hillsdale County Courthouse		Hillsdale	Hillsdale		NRHP-listed (refnum 82002835).
Houghton County Courthouse		Houghton	Houghton		NRHP-listed (refnum 75000945).
Ingham County Courthouse		Ingham	Mason		NRHP-listed (refnum 71000397).
Ionia County Courthouse		Ionia	Ionia		NRHP-listed (refnum 79001155).
Iron County Courthouse		Iron	Crystal Falls		NRHP-listed (refnum 75000948).
Lapeer County Courthouse		Lapeer	Lapeer		NRHP-listed (refnum 71000402).
Lenawee County Courthouse		Lenawee	Adrian		NRHP-listed (refnum 91000212).
Livingston County Courthouse		Livingston	Howell		NRHP-listed (refnum 76001031).
Mackinac County Courthouse		Mackinac	St. Ignace		
Manistee County Courthouse Fountain		Manistee	Onekama		NRHP-listed (refnum 88000065).
Marquette County Courthouse		Marquette	Marquette		NRHP-listed (refnum 78001506).
Mason County Courthouse		Mason	Ludington		NRHP-listed (refnum 88000602).
Menominee County Courthouse		Menominee	Menominee		NRHP-listed (refnum 75000958).
Midland County Courthouse		Midland	Midland		NRHP-listed (refnum 86000381).
Ontonagon County Courthouse		Ontonagon	Ontonagon		NRHP-listed (refnum 80001888).
Oscoda County Courthouse		Oscoda	Mio		NRHP-listed (refnum 72000651).
Ottawa County Courthouse		Ottawa	Grand Haven		Completed in 2009. 117,710 square feet and 120 feet tall.
Presque Isle County Courthouse		Presque Isle	Onaway		NRHP-listed (refnum 80001889).
Shiawassee County Courthouse		Shiawassee	Corunna		NRHP-listed (refnum 82000546).
St. Joseph County Courthouse		St. Joseph	Centreville		NRHP-listed (refnum 93000984).
Tallahatchie County Second District Courthouse		Tallahatchie	Sumner		NRHP-listed (refnum 07000149). Part of Emmett Till and Mamie Till-Mobley National Monument
Tuscola County Courthouse		Tuscola	Caro		NRHP-listed (refnum 96001419).
Van Buren County Courthouse Complex		Van Buren	Paw Paw		NRHP-listed (refnum 79001169).
Old Wayne County Courthouse		Wayne	Detroit	1902	NRHP-listed (refnum 75000972).

== Minnesota ==
Federal courthouses in Minnesota are listed here.

County courthouses in Minnesota are listed here.

== Mississippi ==
Federal courthouses in Mississippi are listed here.

Historically Mississippi may have had a county court in each of its 82 counties but in 2016, Mississippi has just 19 county courts. There are in fact at least five distinct types of non-Federal courts in Mississippi:

- County courts are created by the state legislature to reduce the workload of circuit courts and chancery courts. Adams County Court, for example, has one County Court judge, and has "exclusive jurisdiction over matters involving eminent domain, unlawful entry and detainer, youth courts and partition of personal property." It also "shares jurisdiction with Justice Court in all matters, civil and criminal [and it] also shares jurisdiction with the Circuit and Chancery Courts in all matters of law and equity up to $200,000. The County Court Judge also hears non-capital felony criminal cases transferred by the Circuit Court."
- Circuit courts have "original jurisdiction over all civil and criminal matters not vested exclusively in another court", and most circuit court cases are handled by juries.
- Chancery courts cover "domestic/family matters, divorce, child custody, property division, adoptions, alimony, estates of descendants, land issues (titles, contracts), emancipation (declaring a minor to be 21 for work purposes), property title confirmation, property disputes (over $50,000), insurance settlements to minors, and commitments of mentally disabled."
- Justice courts covers traffic tickets, civil cases including small claims and felony cases through initial appearances and preliminary hearings.
- Youth court covers "matters involving delinquent children, children in need of supervision, and neglected and/or abused children."

County and other non-Federal courthouses, historical and current, include:

Courthouse	Image	County	Location	Built	Notes
Adams County Courthouse		Adams	Natchez	1821	Adams is one of 19 counties currently having a county court. Its historic courthouse is a designated Mississippi Landmark. Located at 201 South Wall Street in Natchez, it was built in 1821 and enlarged in 1925. It is a "pivotal" contributing building in NRHP-listed Natchez On-Top-of-the-Hill Historic District.
Amite County Courthouse		Amite	Liberty; 31°09′27″N 90°48′38″W		NRHP-listed (refnum 74001055).
Attala County Courthouse and Confederate Monument		Attala	Kosciusko; 33°03′30″N 89°35′24″W		NRHP-listed (refnum 97001299).
Chickasaw County Courthouse		Chickasaw	Houston; 33°53′50″N 88°59′58″W	1909	The neoclassical landmark is a contributing building in NRHP-listed Houston Historic District.
Clarke County Courthouse and Confederate Monument		Clarke	Quitman; 32°02′23″N 88°43′39″W		NRHP-listed (refnum 94000511).
Covington County Courthouse		Covington	Collins; 31°38′37″N 89°33′24″W	1906–07	NRHP-listed (refnum 91001894).
DeSoto County Courthouse		DeSoto	Hernando, Mississippi		Included in NRHP-listed Hernando Courthouse Square District
Franklin County Courthouse		Franklin	Meadville		NRHP-listed (refnum 81000327).
Hinds County Courthouse		Hinds	Jackson		NRHP-listed (refnum 86002125).
Hinds County Courthouse		Hinds	Raymond		NRHP-listed (refnum 86001706).
Holmes county Courthouse		Holmes	Lexington		NRHP-listed (refnum 94001301).
Jefferson Davis County Courthouse		Jefferson Davis	Prentiss		NRHP-listed (refnum 94001308).
Jones County Courthouse		Jones	Ellisville		NRHP-listed (refnum 94001307).
Lafayette County Courthouse		Lafayette	Oxford		NRHP-listed (refnum 77000791).
Lawrence County Courthouse		Lawrence	Monticello		NRHP-listed (refnum 93000146).
Lee County Courthouse		Lee	Tupelo		NRHP-listed (refnum 92000161).
Marion County Courthouse		Marion	Columbia		NRHP-listed (refnum 95000178).
Monroe County Courthouse		Monroe	Aberdeen		NRHP-listed (refnum 78001623).
Prentiss County Courthouse		Prentiss	Booneville	1925	Included in NRHP-listed Downtown Booneville Historic District. A three-story Mediterranean Revival-style hipped roof brick building with a five bay arcaded loggia and two two-story flat-roofed wings.
Rankin County Courthouse		Rankin	Brandon		NRHP-listed (refnum 97000796).
Simpson County Courthouse		Simpson	Mendenhall		NRHP-listed (refnum 85001898).
Tate County Courthouse		Tate	Senatobia		NRHP-listed (refnum 94000200).
Tishomingo County Courthouse		Tishomingo	Iuka		
Union County Courthouse		Union	New Albany		NRHP-listed (refnum 90001222).
Walthall County Courthouse and Jail		Walthall	Tylertown		NRHP-listed (refnum 94001302).

== Missouri ==
Federal courthouses in Missouri are listed here.

County courthouses in Missouri are listed here.

== Montana ==
Federal courthouses in Montana are listed here.

County and other courthouses include:

Courthouse name	Image	County	Location	Built	Notes
Cascade County Courthouse		Cascade	Great Falls; 47°30′29″N 111°17′58″W	1901–03	NRHP-listed (refnum 80002401).
Chouteau County Courthouse		Chouteau	Fort Benton; 47°49′03″N 110°39′53″W		NRHP-listed (refnum 80002404).
Daniels County Courthouse		Daniels	Scobey; 48°47′27″N 105°25′12″W	1913	Originally a hotel, the building was bought by the 1920-created new county to serve as a courthouse, in 1920. NRHP-listed (refnum 95000535).
Deer Lodge County Courthouse		Deer Lodge	Anaconda		NRHP-listed (refnum 78001681).
Fergus County Courthouse		Fergus	Lewistown	1907	Contributing building in NRHP-listed Lewistown Courthouse Historic District.
Flathead County Courthouse		Flathead	Kalispell		Contributing building in NRHP-listed Courthouse Historic District.
Gallatin County Courthouse		Gallatin	Bozeman		NRHP-listed (refnum 87001794).
Jefferson County Courthouse		Jefferson	Boulder	1889	NRHP-listed (refnum 80002422).
Madison County Courthouse		Madison	Virginia City, Montana		Contributing building in NRHP-listed Virginia City Historic District
Missoula County Courthouse		Missoula	Missoula	1908	NRHP-listed (refnum 76001125).
Pondera County Courthouse		Pondera	Conrad	1938	Art Deco building designed by A.V. McIver and built by Lease & Leigland
Ravalli County Courthouse		Ravalli	Hamilton	1900	NRHP-listed (refnum 79001424).
Rosebud County Courthouse		Rosebud	Forsyth	1913	NRHP-listed (refnum 86000807).
Teton County Courthouse		Teton	Choteau	1906	NRHP-listed (refnum 6001093).

== Nebraska ==
Federal courthouses in Nebraska are listed here.

County and other courthouses in Nebraska are listed here.

== Nevada ==
Federal courthouses in Nevada are listed here.

County and other courthouses include:

Courthouse	Image	County	Location	Built	Notes
Churchill County Courthouse		Churchill	Fallon; 39°28′30″N 118°46′51″W	1903	Classical Revival. NRHP-listed (refnum 92001258).
Douglas County Courthouse		Douglas	Minden; 38°57′20″N 119°45′48″W	1916	Classical Revival. NRHP-listed (refnum 86002266).
Elko County Courthouse		Elko	Elko		NRHP-listed (refnum 92001259).
Humboldt County Courthouse		Humboldt	Winnemucca		NRHP-listed (refnum 83001109).
Lander County Courthouse		Lander	Austin		NRHP-listed (refnum 3000750).
1938 Lincoln County Courthouse		Lincoln	Pioche; 37°56′13″N 114°27′02″W	1938	Art Moderne (PWA Moderne), NRHP-listed in 2002 (refnum 2000820).
Lincoln County Courthouse		Lincoln	Pioche		NRHP-listed (refnum 78001724).
Lyon County Courthouse		Lyon	Yerington		NRHP-listed (refnum 83001112).
Mineral County Courthouse		Mineral	Hawthorne		NRHP-listed (refnum 82003214).
Nye County Courthouse		Nye	Tonopah		NRHP-listed (refnum 82003238).
Pershing County Courthouse		Pershing	Lovelock		NRHP-listed (refnum 86001077).
Washoe County Courthouse		Washoe	Reno		NRHP-listed (refnum 86002254).
White Pine County Courthouse		White Pine	Ely		NRHP-listed (refnum 86001958).

== New Hampshire ==
Federal courthouses in New Hampshire are listed here.

County and other courthouses include:

Courthouse name	Image	County	Location	Built	Notes
Carroll County Court House		Carroll	Ossipee; 43°41′6″N 71°7′4″W	1916	Now a museum. NRHP-listed (refnum 07000949).
Cheshire County Courthouse		Cheshire	Keene; 42°56′3″N 72°16′48″W	1859	NRHP-listed (refnum 78000210).
Old Grafton County Courthouse		Grafton	Plymouth	1774	NRHP-listed (refnum 82001677).
Woodsville Courthouse		Grafton	Woodsville	1889	
Hillsborough County Courthouse		Hillsborough	Nashua	1901	NRHP-listed (refnum 85001196).
Merrimack County Courthouse		Merrimack	Concord	1857	NRHP-listed (refnum 79000202).
Sullivan County Courthouse		Sullivan	Newport	1825	NRHP-listed (refnum 73000178).

== New Jersey ==
Federal courthouses in New Jersey are listed here

County courthouses in New Jersey are listed here

For state courthouse see Richard J. Hughes Justice Complex.

== New Mexico ==
Federal courthouses in New Mexico are listed here.

County courthouses in New Mexico are listed here.

== New York ==
Federal courthouses in New York are listed here.

State and county courthouses include:

Courthouse	Image	County	Location	Built	Notes
Appellate Division Courthouse of New York State		New York	E. 25th St. near Madison Square Park, Manhattan; 40°44′32″N 73°59′12″W	1896-99	"Outstanding" Beaux-Arts example of City Beautiful movement. NRHP-listed (refnum 82003366).
New York State Court of Appeals Building		Albany	Albany; 42°39′8″N 73°45′13″W	1842	Greek Revival. Originally housed court clerks but not the courtroom. NRHP-listed (refnum 71000520).
Old Allegany County Courthouse		Allegany	Angelica; 42°18′19″N 78°0′58″W	1819	Used as courthouse until 1892. NRHP-listed (refnum 72000821).
Bronx Borough Courthouse		Bronx	Bronx	1905-1914	NRHP-listed (refnum 82003344).
Bronx County Courthouse		Bronx	Bronx	1931-1934	NRHP-listed (refnum 83001636).
Broome County Courthouse		Broome	Binghamton	1897-1898	NRHP-listed (refnum 73001164).
Cayuga County Courthouse and Clerk's Office		Cayuga	Auburn	1922-1924 (current building)	NRHP-listed (refnum 91000721).
Chemung County Courthouse Complex		Chemung	Elmira	1861-1862 (courthouse)	NRHP-listed (refnum 71000531).
Chenango County Courthouse District		Chenango	Norwich	1837 (courthouse)	NRHP-listed (refnum 75001178).
Clinton County Courthouse Complex		Clinton	Plattsburgh	1884–1885	NRHP-listed (refnum 82001101).
First Columbia County Courthouse		Columbia	Claverack	1786	NRHP-listed (refnum 97001623).
Cortland County Courthouse		Cortland	Cortland	1922–1924	NRHP-listed (refnum 74001228).
Delaware County Courthouse Square District		Delaware	Delhi	1831	NRHP-listed (refnum 73001177).
Dutchess County Court House		Dutchess	Poughkeepsie	1903 (current building)	NRHP-listed (refnum).
Fulton County Courthouse		Fulton	Johnstown	1773	NRHP-listed (refnum 72000841). Oldest courthouse in New York and amongst the oldest in the US still in original function.
Genesee County Courthouse		Genesee	Batavia	1841	NRHP-listed (refnum 73001193).
Genesee County Courthouse Historic District		Genesee	Batavia		NRHP-listed (refnum 82001173).
Hamilton County Courthouse Complex		Hamilton	Lake Pleasant	1929 (courthouse)	NRHP-listed (refnum 92001280).
Herkimer County Courthouse		Herkimer	Herkimer	1873	NRHP-listed (refnum 72000844).
Jefferson County Courthouse Complex		Jefferson	Watertown	1862	NRHP-listed (refnum 74001248).
Old Madison County Courthouse		Madison	Morrisville		NRHP-listed (refnum 78001860).
Old Nassau County Courthouse		Nassau	Garden City		NRHP-listed (refnum 78001863).
Niagara County Courthouse and County Clerk's Office		Niagara	Lockport		NRHP-listed (refnum 97000417).
1841 Goshen Courthouse		Orange	Goshen; 41°24′09″N 74°19′20″W	1841	Greek Revival, Late Victorian, NRHP-listed in 1975
Orleans County Courthouse Historic District		Orleans	Albion		NRHP-listed (refnum 79001617).
Oswego County Courthouse		Oswego	Oswego		NRHP-listed (refnum 1418).
Otsego County Courthouse		Otsego	Cooperstown	1880	NRHP-listed (refnum 72000902).
Putnam County Courthouse		Putnam	Carmel	1814	NRHP-listed (refnum 76001264).
Long Island City Courthouse Complex		Queens	Long Island City, Queens	1876	NRHP-listed (refnum).
Richmond County Courthouse		Richmond	St. George, Staten Island	1919	NRHP-listed (refnum 83004150).
Rockland County Courthouse and Dutch Gardens		Rockland	New City	1928	NRHP-listed (refnum 90002104).
Schoharie County Courthouse Complex		Schoharie	Schoharie	1870	NRHP-listed (refnum 95001010).
Schuyler County Courthouse Complex		Schuyler	Watkins Glen	1855	NRHP-listed (refnum 74001305).
Seneca County Courthouse Complex at Ovid		Seneca	Ovid	1845	NRHP-listed (refnum 76001277).
Steuben County Courthouse		Steuben	Corning	1903	Architect: J. Foster Warner
Tioga County Courthouse		Tioga	Owego		NRHP-listed (refnum 72000915).
Second Tompkins County Courthouse		Tompkins	Ithaca	1854	NRHP-listed (refnum 71000562).
(third) Tompkins County Courthouse		Tompkins	Ithaca	1932	Architect: J. Lakin Baldridge
Old Warren County Courthouse Complex		Warren	Lake George	1845	NRHP-listed (refnum 73001282).
Yates County Courthouse Park District		Yates	Penn Yan	1835	NRHP-listed (refnum 79001652).

== North Carolina ==
Federal courthouses in North Carolina are listed here.

County courthouses in North Carolina are listed here.

== North Dakota ==
Federal courthouses in North Dakota are listed here.

County and other courthouses include:

Courthouse	Image	County	Location	Built	Notes
Adams County Courthouse (North Dakota)		Adams	Hettinger; 46°0′5″N 102°38′4″W	1928	Economical Art Deco; NRHP-listed (refnum 85002977).
Barnes County Courthouse		Barnes	Valley City; 46°55′38″N 98°0′18″W	1925	"Built for the people of Barnes County to perpetuate order and justice". NRHP-listed (refnum 85002978).
Benson County Courthouse		Benson	Minnewaukan	1900	Richardsonian Romanesque; NRHP-listed (refnum 78001988).
Billings County Courthouse		Billings	Medora	c.1880	NRHP-listed (refnum 77001016).
Burke County Courthouse		Burke	Bowbells	1928	NRHP-listed (refnum 85002979).
Burleigh County Courthouse		Burleigh	Bismarck	1931	Art Deco; NRHP-listed (refnum 85002980).
Cass County Courthouse		Cass	Fargo	1904	NRHP-listed (refnum 83004062).
Dickey County Courthouse		Dickey	Ellendale	1910	Beaux-Arts; NRHP-listed (refnum 80004283).
Divide County Courthouse		Divide	Crosby	1917	Beaux-Arts; NRHP-listed (refnum 80002910).
Eddy County Courthouse		Eddy	New Rockford	1900	NRHP-listed (refnum 85002981).
Emmons County Courthouse		Emmons	Linton	1934	Art Deco-Art Moderne; NRHP-listed (refnum 85002982).
Foster County Courthouse		Foster	Carrington	1909	Beaux-Arts; NRHP-listed (refnum 80002911).
Golden Valley County Courthouse		Golden Valley	Beach	1923	Federal Revival; NRHP-listed (refnum 85002983).
Grand Forks County Courthouse		Grand Forks	Grand Forks		NRHP-listed (refnum 80002913).
Griggs County Courthouse		Griggs	Cooperstown		NRHP-listed (refnum 77001025).
Hettinger County Courthouse		Hettinger	Mott		NRHP-listed (refnum 85002984).
Kidder County Courthouse		Kidder	Steele		NRHP-listed (refnum 85002985).
LaMoure County Courthouse		LaMoure	LaMoure		NRHP-listed (refnum 80004284).
Logan County Courthouse		Logan	Napoleon		NRHP-listed (refnum 85002986).
McHenry County Courthouse		McHenry	Towner		NRHP-listed (refnum 80002917).
McIntosh County Courthouse		McIntosh	Ashley		NRHP-listed (refnum 80002918).
Former McLean County Courthouse		McLean	Washburn		NRHP-listed (refnum 85002987).
McLean County Courthouse		McLean	Washburn		NRHP-listed (refnum 85002998).
Mountrail County Courthouse		Mountrail	Stanley		NRHP-listed (refnum 78001992).
Pembina County Courthouse		Pembina	Cavalier		NRHP-listed (refnum 80002923).
Pierce County Courthouse		Pierce	Rugby		NRHP-listed (refnum 80002924).
Ransom County Courthouse		Ransom	Lisbon		NRHP-listed (refnum 85002988).
Renville County Courthouse		Renville	Mohall		NRHP-listed (refnum 85002989).
Richland County Courthouse		Richland	Wahpeton		NRHP-listed (refnum 80002926).
Sargent County Courthouse		Sargent	Forman		NRHP-listed (refnum 80002927).
Sheridan County Courthouse		Sheridan	McClusky		NRHP-listed (refnum 85002990).
Original Slope County Courthouse		Slope	Amidon		NRHP-listed (refnum 85002994).
Stark County Courthouse		Stark	Dickinson		NRHP-listed (refnum 85002991).
Steele County Courthouse		Steele	Finley		NRHP-listed (refnum 85002995).
Stutsman County Courthouse and Sheriff's Residence/Jail		Stutsman	Jamestown		NRHP-listed (refnum 76001356).
Towner County Courthouse		Towner	Cando		NRHP-listed (refnum 85002996).
Traill County Courthouse		Traill	Hillsboro		NRHP-listed (refnum 80002928).
Walsh County Courthouse		Walsh	Grafton		NRHP-listed (refnum 85002992).
Ward County Courthouse		Ward	Minot		NRHP-listed (refnum 85002997).
Wells County Courthouse		Wells	Fessenden		NRHP-listed (refnum 77001037).
Williams County Courthouse		Williams	Williston; 48°08′48.83″N 103°37′11.66″W	1954	Modern

== Ohio ==
Federal courthouses in Ohio are listed here.

County and other courthouses include:

Courthouse	Image	County	Location	Built	Notes
Adams County Courthouse (Ohio)		Adams	West Union, Ohio; 38°47′38″N 83°32′37″W	1910-11	
Athens County Courthouse		Athens	Athens, Ohio; 39°19′35″N 82°6′2″W	1877-80	NRHP CP-listed in Athens Governmental Buildings
Allen County Courthouse (Ohio)		Allen	Lima, Ohio; 40°44′34″N 84°6′20″W	1881	Second Empire. NRHP-listed
Ashland County Courthouse		Ashland	Ashland	1928-1929	NRHP-listed (refnum 79003786).
Ashtabula County Courthouse Group		Ashtabula	Jefferson	1850 (courthouse)	NRHP-listed (refnum 75001316).
Auglaize County Courthouse		Auglaize	Wapakoneta	1894	NRHP-listed (refnum 73001387).
Butler County Courthouse		Butler	Hamilton	1885	NRHP-listed (refnum 81000429).
Carroll County Courthouse		Carroll	Carrollton		NRHP-listed (refnum 74001406).
Coshocton County Courthouse		Coshocton	Coshocton	1873	NRHP-listed (refnum 73001402).
Darke County Courthouse		Darke	Greenville	1870	NRHP-listed (refnum 76001409).
Delaware County Courthouse		Delaware	Delaware	1868	NRHP-listed (refnum 73001429).
Fayette County Courthouse		Fayette	Washington Courthouse	1882	NRHP-listed (refnum 73001433).
Fulton County Courthouse		Fulton	Wauseon	1870	NRHP-listed (refnum 73001447).
Geauga County Courthouse		Geauga	Chardon	c. 1870	NRHP-listed as part of Chardon Courthouse Square District
Guernsey County Courthouse		Guernsey	Cambridge	1881	NRHP-listed (refnum 73001452).
First Hancock County Courthouse		Hancock	Findlay	1833	NRHP-listed (refnum 76001454).
Hancock County Courthouse		Hancock	Findlay	1886-1888	NRHP-listed (refnum 73001475).
Hardin County Courthouse		Hardin	Kenton	1813	NRHP-listed (refnum 79001863).
Harrison County Courthouse		Harrison	Cadiz	1893	NRHP-listed (refnum 74001524).
Henry County Courthouse		Henry	Napoleon	1880	NRHP-listed (refnum 73001477).
Highland County Courthouse		Highland	Hillsboro	1833	NRHP-listed (refnum 78002087).
Holmes County Courthouse and Jail		Holmes	Millersburg	1880	NRHP-listed (refnum 74001529).
Huron County Courthouse and Jail		Huron	Norwalk	1913	NRHP-listed (refnum 74001534).
Knox County Courthouse		Knox	Mount Vernon	1855	NRHP-listed (refnum 73001484).
Licking County Courthouse		Licking	Newark	1876-1878	NRHP-listed (refnum 73001496).
Logan County Courthouse		Logan	Bellefontaine	1870	NRHP-listed (refnum 73001497).
Lorain County Courthouse		Lorain	Elyria	1881	NRHP-listed (refnum 75001463).
Lucas County Courthouse and Jail		Lucas	Toledo	1896	NRHP-listed (refnum 73002295).
Madison County Courthouse		Madison	London	1892	NRHP-listed (refnum 73001504).
Mahoning County Courthouse		Mahoning	Youngstown	1908-1909	NRHP-listed (refnum 74001569).
Old Mahoning County Courthouse		Mahoning	Canfield		NRHP-listed (refnum 74001563).
Marion County Courthouse		Marion	Marion	1884-1885	NRHP-listed (refnum 74001572).
Medina County Courthouse		Medina	Medina		NRHP-listed (refnum 70000507).
Old Meigs County Courthouse and Chester Academy		Meigs	Chester	1840s	NRHP-listed (refnum 75001488).
Miami County Courthouse and Power Station		Miami	Troy	1885	NRHP-listed (refnum 75001490).
Monroe County Courthouse		Monroe	Woodsfield	1905	NRHP-listed (refnum 80003168).
Montgomery County Courthouse		Montgomery	Dayton	1847	NRHP-listed (refnum 70000510).
Morrow County Courthouse and Jail		Morrow	Mount Gilead		NRHP-listed (refnum 74001586).
Muskingum County Courthouse And Jail		Muskingum	Zanesville	1870	NRHP-listed (refnum 73001515).
Ottawa County Courthouse		Ottawa	Port Clinton	1898–1901	NRHP-listed (refnum 74001588).
Paulding County Courthouse		Paulding	Paulding	1886	NRHP-listed (refnum 74001589).
Perry County Courthouse and Jail		Perry	New Lexington	1887	NRHP-listed (refnum 81000449).
Pickaway County Courthouse		Pickaway	Circleville	1847	Contributing in NRHP-listed Circleville Historic District.
Putnam County Courthouse		Putnam	Ottawa	1912	NRHP-listed (refnum 74001608).
Scioto County Courthouse		Scioto	Portsmouth	1925	NRHP-listed (refnum 87002101).
Stark County Courthouse and Annex		Stark	Canton	1895	NRHP-listed (refnum 75001534).
Summit County Courthouse and Annex		Summit	Akron	1905–1908	NRHP-listed (refnum 74001625).
Trumbull County Courthouse		Trumbull	Warren		NRHP-listed (refnum 74001637).
Tuscarawas County Courthouse		Tuscarawas	New Philadelphia	1882	NRHP-listed (refnum 73001544).
Van Wert County Courthouse		Van Wert	Van Wert	1876	NRHP-listed (refnum 74001639).
Wayne County Courthouse District		Wayne	Wooster	1877–1879	NRHP-listed (refnum 73001551).
Williams County Courthouse		Williams	Bryan	1889–1891	NRHP-listed (refnum 73001552).
Wood County Courthouse and Jail		Wood	Bowling Green	1893–1894	NRHP-listed (refnum 74001651).
Wyandot County Courthouse and Jail		Wyandot	Upper Sandusky	1894	NRHP-listed (refnum 73001553).

== Oklahoma ==
Federal courthouses in Oklahoma are listed here.

County and other courthouses include:

Courthouse	Image	County	Location	Built	Notes
Adair County Courthouse		Adair	Stilwell; 35°48′51″N 94°37′43″W		NRHP-listed (refnum 84002927).
Alfalfa County Courthouse		Alfalfa	Cherokee; 36°45′18″N 98°21′22″W		NRHP-listed (refnum 84002937).
Beaver County Courthouse		Beaver	Beaver City; 36°48′57″N 100°31′16″W		NRHP-listed (refnum 84002964).
Beckham County Courthouse		Beckham	Sayre; 35°17′29″N 99°38′12″W	1911	Domed. Tallest building in Sayre. NRHP-listed (refnum 84002968).
Blaine County Courthouse		Blaine	Watonga; 35°50′46″N 98°24′38″W	1906	NRHP-listed (refnum 84002972).
Bryan County Courthouse		Bryan	Durant		NRHP-listed (refnum 84002974).
Carter County Courthouse		Carter	Ardmore		NRHP-listed (refnum 85000678).
Cimarron County Courthouse		Cimarron	Boise City		NRHP-listed (refnum 84002988).
Cleveland County Courthouse		Cleveland	Norman		NRHP-listed (refnum 1580).
Cotton County Courthouse		Cotton	Walters		NRHP-listed (refnum 84002990).
Craig County Courthouse		Craig	Vinita		NRHP-listed (refnum 84002994).
Creek County Courthouse		Creek	Sapulpa		NRHP-listed (refnum 85000679).
Dewey County Courthouse		Dewey	Taloga		NRHP-listed (refnum 85000680).
Ellis County Courthouse		Ellis	Arnett		NRHP-listed (refnum 85000681).
Garfield County Courthouse		Garfield	Enid		NRHP-listed (refnum 84003018).
Garvin County Courthouse		Garvin	Pauls Valley		NRHP-listed (refnum 85002758).
Grady County Courthouse		Grady	Chickasha		NRHP-listed (refnum 5000131).
Grant County Courthouse		Grant	Medford		NRHP-listed (refnum 84003027).
Greer County Courthouse		Greer	Mangum		NRHP-listed (refnum 85000682).
Harmon County Courthouse		Harmon	Hollis		NRHP-listed (refnum 84003031).
Harper County Courthouse		Harper	Buffalo		NRHP-listed (refnum 84003041).
Haskell County Courthouse		Haskell	Stigler		NRHP-listed (refnum 84003061).
Jackson County Courthouse		Jackson	Altus		NRHP-listed (refnum 84003064).
Jackson County Courthouse and Jail (Boundary Increase)		Jackson	Altus		NRHP-listed (refnum 8000901).
Jefferson County Courthouse		Jefferson	Waurika		NRHP-listed (refnum 84003065).
Kay County Courthouse		Kay	Newkirk		NRHP-listed (refnum 84003070).
Kiowa County Courthouse		Kiowa	Hobart		NRHP-listed (refnum 84003094).
LeFlore County Courthouse		LeFlore	Poteau		NRHP-listed (refnum 84003099).
Logan County Courthouse		Logan	Guthrie		NRHP-listed (refnum 84003141).
Love County Courthouse		Love	Marietta		NRHP-listed (refnum 84003148).
Major County Courthouse		Major	Fairview		NRHP-listed (refnum 84003153).
Marshall County Courthouse		Marshall	Madill		NRHP-listed (refnum 84003154).
McClain County Courthouse		McClain	Purcell		NRHP-listed (refnum 84003347).
McIntosh County Courthouse		McIntosh	Eufaula		NRHP-listed (refnum 85000683).
Murray County Courthouse		Murray	Sulphur		NRHP-listed (refnum 84003352).
Muskogee County Courthouse		Muskogee	Muskogee		NRHP-listed (refnum 84003173).
Noble County Courthouse		Noble	Perry		NRHP-listed (refnum 84003361).
Nowata County Courthouse		Nowata	Nowata		NRHP-listed (refnum 84003375).
Okfuskee County Courthouse		Okfuskee	Okemah		NRHP-listed (refnum 84003377).
Oklahoma County Courthouse		Oklahoma	Oklahoma City		NRHP-listed (refnum 92000126).
Okmulgee County Courthouse		Okmulgee	Okmulgee		NRHP-listed (refnum 84003390).
Osage County Courthouse		Osage	Pawhuska		NRHP-listed (refnum 84003395).
Ottawa County Courthouse		Ottawa	Miami		NRHP-listed (refnum 4000122).
Pawnee County Courthouse		Pawnee	Pawnee		NRHP-listed (refnum 84003406).
Payne County Courthouse		Payne	Stillwater		NRHP-listed (refnum 84003410).
Pittsburg County Courthouse		Pittsburg	McAlester		NRHP-listed (refnum 84003415).
Pontotoc County Courthouse		Pontotoc	Ada		NRHP-listed (refnum 84003418).
Pottawatomie County Courthouse		Pottawatomie	Shawnee		NRHP-listed (refnum 84003424).
Seminole County Courthouse		Seminole	Wewoka		NRHP-listed (refnum 84003429).
Texas County Courthouse		Texas	Guymon		NRHP-listed (refnum 84003439).
Tillman County Courthouse		Tillman	Frederick		NRHP-listed (refnum 84003455).
Old Washington County Courthouse		Washington	Bartlesville		NRHP-listed (refnum 81000469).
Washita County Courthouse		Washita	Cordell		NRHP-listed (refnum 84003452).

== Oregon ==
Federal courthouses in Oregon are listed here.

County and other courthouses include:

Courthouse	Image	County	Location	Built	Notes
Benton County Courthouse		Benton	Corvallis; 44°33′55″N 123°15′44″W	1888	Oldest courthouse in Oregon still being used as a courthouse. NRHP-listed (refnum 78002278).
Clatsop County Courthouse		Clatsop	Astoria; 46°11′20″N 123°50′07″W	1908	NRHP-listed (refnum 84002954).
Crook County Courthouse		Crook	Prineville; 44°18′09″N 120°50′38″W	1909	
Douglas County Courthouse		Douglas	Roseburg 43°12'40.2"N 123°20'28.7"W	1929	
Jackson County Courthouse (Medford)		Jackson	Medford; 42°19′23″N 122°52′40″W	1932	Art Deco. NRHP-listed (refnum 86002921).
Jackson County Courthouse (Jackson)		Jackson	Medford; 42°18′52″N 122°57′56″W	1883	Contributing property in NRHP-listed Jacksonville Historic District
Morrow County Courthouse		Morrow	Heppner; 45°21′13″N 119°32′56″W	1902–03	Exterior is dark blue basalt set off by lighter stone. NRHP-listed (refnum 85000366).
Multnomah County Courthouse (old)		Multnomah	Portland; 45°30′59″N 122°40′42″W	1911–14	NRHP-listed (refnum 79002136). Decommissioned as a courthouse in 2020.
Multnomah County Central Courthouse		Multnomah	Portland; 45°30′50.4″N 122°40′30″W	2020	
Sherman County Courthouse		Sherman	Moro; 45°24′23″N 120°44′0″W	1899	NRHP-listed (refnum 98001122).
Wallowa County Courthouse		Wallowa	Enterprise; 45.425093°N 117.276918°W	1909–10	NRHP-listed.
First Wasco County Courthouse		Wasco	The Dalles		NRHP-listed (refnum 98000260).

== Pennsylvania ==
Federal courthouses in Pennsylvania are listed here.

State and County courthouses in Pennsylvania are listed here.

== Rhode Island ==
Federal courthouses in Rhode Island are listed here.

County courthouses include:

Courthouse	Image	County	Location	Built	Notes
Bristol County Courthouse		Bristol	Bristol; 41°39′48″N 71°16′17″W	1816	NRHP-listed (refnum 70000011).
Kent County Courthouse		Kent	East Greenwich; 41°39′39″N 71°27′2″W	1804-05	Oldest active courthouse in the state. NRHP-listed (refnum 70000013).
Old Colony House		Newport County	Washington Sq., Newport; 41°29′27″N 71°18′48″W	1736–1739	County courthouse during 1900–1926. Richard Munday
Providence County Courthouse		Providence	250 Benefit Street, Providence; 41°49′31.76″N 71°24′24.84″W	1926–1930	11th tallest building in Rhode Island.
Washington County Court House		Washington	South Kingstown; 41°29′2″N 71°33′21″W	1892	Romanesque. NRHP-listed (refnum 92001542).

Also from category, to check:

- Old State House (Providence, Rhode Island)

== South Carolina ==
Federal courthouses in South Carolina are listed here.

County courthouses in South Carolina are listed here.

== South Dakota ==
Federal courthouses in South Dakota are listed here.

County and other courthouses include:

Courthouse	Image	County	Location	Built	Notes
Aurora County Courthouse		Aurora	Plankinton; 43°43′4″N 98°29′6″W	1940	Art Moderne, Art Deco. NRHP-listed (refnum 92001855).
Bon Homme County Courthouse		Bon Homme	Tyndall; 42°59′38″N 97°51′58″W		NRHP-listed (refnum 84000581).
Brookings County Courthouse		Brookings	Brookings; 44°18′32″N 96°47′43″W	1912	Renaissance Revival. NRHP-listed (refnum 76001715).
Brown County Courthouse		Brown	Aberdeen		NRHP-listed (refnum 76001718).
Butte County Courthouse		Butte	Belle Fourche		NRHP-listed (refnum 98001398).
Charles Mix County Courthouse		Charles Mix	Lake Andes		NRHP-listed (refnum 92001856).
Clark County Courthouse		Clark	Clark		NRHP-listed (refnum 2000026).
Clay County Courthouse		Clay	Vermillion		NRHP-listed (refnum 83003005).
Codington County Courthouse		Codington	Watertown		NRHP-listed (refnum 78002545).
Custer County Courthouse		Custer	Custer		NRHP-listed (refnum 72001226).
Deuel County Courthouse and Jail		Deuel	Clear Lake		NRHP-listed (refnum 76001730).
Douglas County Courthouse		Douglas	Armour		NRHP-listed (refnum 78002549).
Edmunds County Courthouse		Edmunds	Ipswich		NRHP-listed (refnum 997).
Faulk County Courthouse		Faulk	Faulkton		NRHP-listed (refnum 92001857).
Grant County Courthouse		Grant	Milbank		NRHP-listed (refnum 92001858).
Gregory County Courthouse		Gregory	Burke		Built in 1934 by the PWA. NRHP-listed (refnum 100006095).
Hamlin County Courthouse		Hamlin	Hayti		NRHP-listed (refnum 1225).
Hand County Courthouse		Hand	Miller		NRHP-listed (refnum 94000193).
Hughes County Courthouse		Hughes	Pierre		NRHP-listed (refnum 92001859).
Hyde County Courthouse		Hyde	Highmore		NRHP-listed (refnum 78002558).
Jerauld County Courthouse		Jerauld	Wessington Springs		NRHP-listed (refnum 92001860).
Kingsbury County Courthouse		Kingsbury	De Smet		NRHP-listed (refnum 77001249).
Lake County Courthouse		Lake	Madison		NRHP-listed (refnum 92001861).
Marshall County Courthouse		Marshall	Britton		NRHP-listed (refnum 6000047).
McCook County Courthouse		McCook	Salem		NRHP-listed (refnum 92001862).
McPherson County Courthouse		McPherson	Leola		NRHP-listed (refnum 86003020).
Minnehaha County Courthouse		Minnehaha	Sioux Falls		
Moody County Courthouse		Moody	Flandreau		NRHP-listed (refnum 92001863).
Pennington County Courthouse		Pennington	Rapid City		NRHP-listed (refnum 76001751).
Potter County Courthouse		Potter	Gettysburg		NRHP-listed (refnum 96000743).
Roberts County Courthouse		Roberts	Sisseton		NRHP-listed (refnum 76001755).
Spink County Courthouse		Spink	Redfield		NRHP-listed (refnum 1001219).
Sully County Courthouse		Sully	Onida		NRHP-listed (refnum 1000414).
Walworth County Courthouse		Walworth	Selby		NRHP-listed (refnum 99000680).
Ziebach County Courthouse		Ziebach	Dupree		NRHP-listed (refnum 92001864).

== Tennessee ==
Federal courthouses in Tennessee are listed here

County and other courthouses include:

Courthouse	Image	County	Location	Built	Notes
Bledsoe County Courthouse		Bledsoe	Pikeville; 35°36′20″N 85°11′19″W		NRHP-listed (refnum 95000346).
Bradley County Courthouse		Bradley	Cleveland; 35°09′36.6″N 84°52′31.3″W	1965	Part of Cleveland Commercial Historic District. NRHP-listed (refnum 16000115).
Cannon County Courthouse		Cannon	Woodbury; 35°49′42″N 86°4′15″W	1935	NRHP-listed (refnum 92000347).
Cheatham County Courthouse		Cheatham	Ashland City; 36°16′29″N 87°03′49″W		NRHP-listed (refnum 76001769).
Chester County Courthouse		Chester	Henderson; 35°26′24″N 88°38′27″W	1913	NRHP-listed (refnum 79002418).
Clay County Courthouse		Clay	Celina		NRHP-listed (refnum 77001261).
Cocke County Courthouse		Cocke	Newport		NRHP-listed (refnum 95000538).
Coffee County Courthouse		Coffee	Manchester		NRHP-listed (refnum 74001905).
Cumberland County Courthouses		Cumberland	Crossville		NRHP-listed (refnum 80003783).
Davidson County Courthouse		Davidson	Nashville		NRHP-listed (refnum 87000670).
DeKalb County Courthouse		DeKalb	Smithville	1969	
Dickson County Courthouse		Dickson	Charlotte		Part of Charlotte Courthouse Square Historic District. NRHP-listed (refnum 77001266).
Fayette County Courthouse		Fayette	Somerville		A contributing building in Somerville Historic District, NRHP-listed in Fayette County
Franklin County Courthouse		Franklin	Winchester		NRHP-listed (refnum 95000345).
Gibson County Courthouse		Gibson	Trenton; 35°58′51″N 88°56′29″W		NRHP-listed (refnum 76001777).
Pulaski Courthouse		Giles	Pulaski		Contributing property in NRHP-listed Pulaski Courthouse Square Historic District
Hamblen County Courthouse		Hamblen	Morristown; 36°12′44″N 83°17′55″W		NRHP-listed (refnum 73001770).
Hamilton County Courthouse		Hamilton	Chattanooga		NRHP-listed (refnum 78002596).
Jackson County Courthouse		Jackson	Gainesboro; 36°21′19.6″N 85°39′31.6″W	1927	Gainesboro Historic District (refnum 90001570).
James County Courthouse		James	Ooltewah; 35°04′17″N 85°03′37″W	1913	NRHP-listed (refnum 76001782).
Knox County Courthouse		Knox	Knoxville; 35°57′39″N 83°55′1″W	1885	NRHP-listed (refnum 73001803).
Lauderdale County Courthouse		Lauderdale	Ripley; 35.745833°N 89.530278°W	1936	PWA Moderne-style. First-completed Public Works Administration-funded courthouse in Tennessee. NRHP-listed (refnum 95000343).
Lewis County Courthouse		Lewis	Hohenwald		NRHP-listed (refnum 6000203).
Loudon County Courthouse		Loudon	Loudon		NRHP-listed (refnum 75001768).
Madison County Courthouse		Madison	Jackson		NRHP-listed (refnum 95000342).
Meigs County Courthouse		Meigs	Decatur		NRHP-listed (refnum 78002613).
Monroe County Courthouse		Monroe	Madisonville		NRHP-listed (refnum 95000341).
Montgomery County Courthouse		Montgomery	Clarksville		Contributing building in Clarksville Architectural District. District is NRHP listed.
Moore County Courthouse and Jail		Moore	Lynchburg		NRHP-listed (refnum 79002452).
Obion County Courthouse		Obion	Union City		NRHP-listed (refnum 95000340).
Overton County Courthouse		Overton	Livingston		NRHP-listed (refnum 80003852).
Perry County Courthouse		Perry	Linden		NRHP-listed (refnum 95000339).
Pickett County Courthouse		Pickett	Byrdstown		NRHP-listed (refnum 95000338).
Polk County Courthouse		Polk	Benton		NRHP-listed (refnum 93000562).
Rhea County Courthouse		Rhea	Dayton; 35°29′41.74″N 85°00′45.63″W	1891 built 1972 NRHP-listed	Site of 1925 Scopes trial about teaching of evolution. Italian villa in style.
Roane County Courthouse		Roane	Kingston; 35°52′18″N 84°30′57″W	1850s built 1971 NRHP-listed	Greek Revival in style.
Robertson County Courthouse		Robertson	Springfield		NRHP-listed (refnum 78002627).
Rutherford County Courthouse		Rutherford	Murfreesboro		NRHP-listed (refnum 73001826).
Sequatchie County Courthouse		Sequatchie	Dunlap		NRHP-listed (refnum 80003853).
Sevier County Courthouse		Sevier	Sevierville		NRHP-listed (refnum 71000832).
Smith County Courthouse		Smith	Carthage		NRHP-listed (refnum 79002483).
Tipton County Courthouse		Tipton	Covington		
Wayne County Courthouse		Wayne	Waynesboro	NRHP-listed (refnum 100005369)	
Williamson County Courthouse		Williamson	Franklin		On its grounds is the NRHP-listed Confederate Monument (Franklin, Tennessee).

== Texas ==
Federal courthouses in Texas are listed here.

County courthouses in Texas are partially listed here.

== Utah ==
Federal courthouses in Utah are listed here.

County and other courthouses include:

Courthouse	Image	County	Location	Built	Notes
Beaver County Courthouse		Beaver	Beaver; 38°16′37″N 112°38′25″W	1882	Late Victorian, NRHP-listed in 1970 (refnum 70000622).
Box Elder County Courthouse		Box Elder	Brigham City; 41°30′38″N 112°0′51″W	1857, 1910	Classical Revival, designed by Funk and Wells. NRHP-listed in 1988 (refnum 88000399).
Piute County Courthouse		Piute	Junction; 38°14′14″N 112°13′13″W	1903	Edwardian, designed by Watkins, Young & Morrill, NRHP-listed in 1971 (refnum 71000844).
Sanpete County Courthouse		Sanpete	Manti; 39°16′05″N 111°38′09″W		NRHP-listed in 1985 (refnum 85000811).
Summit County Courthouse		Summit	Coalville; 40°55′05″N 111°23′53″W		NRHP-listed in 1978(refnum 78002694).
Tooele County Courthouse and City Hall		Tooele	Tooele; 40°31′51″N 112°17′51″W	1867	Greek Revival, NRHP-listed in 1983 (refnum 83003194).
Old Washington County Courthouse		Washington	St. George; 37°6′39″N 113°34′50″W	1876	Served as courthouse until 1960. NRHP-listed in 1970 (refnum 70000634).

== Vermont ==
Federal courthouses in Vermont are listed here.

County and other courthouses include:

Courthouse	Image	County	Location	Built	Notes
Chittenden County Courthouse		Chittenden	Burlington; 44°28′33″N 73°12′44″W	1906	Beaux-Arts style. NRHP-listed (refnum 73000192).
Old Chittenden County Courthouse		Chittenden	Burlington; 44°28′02″N 73°12′44″W	1872	Second Empire style. Burned down in 1982; formerly NRHP-listed (refnum 73000192).
Grand Isle County Courthouse		Grand Isle	North Hero; 44°49′07″N 73°17′24″W	1824	Federal style. NRHP-listed (refnum 95001523).
Lamoille County Courthouse		Lamoille	Hyde Park; 44°35′35″N 72°37′04″W	1912	Romanesque Revival and Colonial Revival styles. NRHP-listed (refnum 95001497).
Orleans County Courthouse and Jail Complex		Orleans	Newport; 44°56′07″N 72°12′38″W	1886	Queen Anne and Romanesque Revival styles. NRHP-listed (refnum 84000336).
Rutland County Courthouse		Chittenden	Rutland; 43°36′26″N 72°58′33″W	1869	Italianate style. Contributing property to the NRHP-listed Rutland Courthouse Historic District (refnum 76000148).
Washington County Courthouse		Washington	Montpelier; 44°15′39″N 72°34′38″W	1881	NRHP-listed (refnum 78000246).

== Virginia ==
Federal courthouses in Virginia are listed here.

County and other courthouses include:

Courthouse	Image	County	Location	Built	Notes
Albemarle County Courthouse		Albemarle	Charlottesville; 38°1′55″N 78°28′38″W		In NRHP-listed Albemarle County Courthouse Historic District (refnum 72001503) and Charlottesville and Albemarle County Courthouse Historic District (refnum 82004904).
Augusta County Courthouse		Augusta	Staunton; 38°8′55″N 79°4′21″W	1901	Fifth courthouse on the site. NRHP-listed (refnum 82001826).
Brunswick County Courthouse		Brunswick	Lawrenceville; 36°45′30″N 77°50′49″W	1854–1855	In NRHP-listed Brunswick County Courthouse Square (refnum 74002110).
Buchanan County Courthouse		Buchanan	Grundy		NRHP-listed (refnum 82004545).
Campbell County Courthouse		Campbell	Rustburg		NRHP-listed (refnum 81000638).
Caroline County Courthouse		Caroline	Bowling Green		NRHP-listed (refnum 73001999).
Carroll County Courthouse		Carroll	Hillsville		NRHP-listed (refnum 82004549).
Charles City County Courthouse		Charles City	Charles City		NRHP-listed (refnum 69000335).
Charlotte County Courthouse		Charlotte	Charlotte Court House		NRHP-listed (refnum 80004178).
Chesterfield County Courthouse and Courthouse Square		Chesterfield	Chesterfield		NRHP-listed (refnum 92001008).
Old Clarke County Courthouse		Clarke	Berryville		NRHP-listed (refnum 83003277).
Cumberland County Courthouse		Cumberland	Cumberland		NRHP-listed (refnum 94001178).
Dickenson County Courthouse		Dickenson	Clintwood		NRHP-listed (refnum 82004553).
Dinwiddie County Court House		Dinwiddie	Dinwiddie		NRHP-listed (refnum 73002008).
Fairfax County Courthouse		Fairfax	Fairfax		Fairfax County Courthouse and Jail. NRHP-listed (refnums 74002235 and 81000673).
Fluvanna County Courthouse Historic District		Fluvanna	Palmyra		NRHP-listed (refnum 71000977).
Frederick County Courthouse		Frederick	Winchester		NRHP-listed (refnum 1000690).
Giles County Courthouse		Giles	Pearisburg		NRHP-listed (refnum 82004560).
Gloucester County Courthouse Square Historic District		Gloucester	Gloucester		NRHP-listed (refnum 73002016).
Grayson County Courthouse		Grayson	Independence		NRHP-listed (refnum 78003019).
Old Grayson County Courthouse and Clerk's Office		Grayson	Galax		NRHP-listed (refnum 97000151).
Greene County Courthouse		Greene	Stanardsville		NRHP-listed (refnum 70000799).
Greensville County Courthouse Complex		Greensville	Emporia		NRHP-listed (refnum 83003279).
Halifax County Courthouse		Halifax	Halifax		NRHP-listed (refnum 82004563).
Hanover County Courthouse		Hanover	Hanover Court House		NRHP-listed (refnum 69000247).
Hanover County Courthouse Historic District		Hanover	Hanover		NRHP-listed (refnum 71000980).
King William County Courthouse		King William	King William		NRHP-listed (refnum 69000251).
Louisa County Courthouse		Louisa	Louisa		NRHP-listed (refnum 90001998).
Madison County Courthouse		Madison	Madison		NRHP-listed (refnum 69000258).
Madison County Courthouse Historic District		Madison	Madison		NRHP-listed (refnum 84003549).
Mathews County Courthouse Square		Mathews	Mathews		NRHP-listed (refnum 77001491).
Mecklenburg County Courthouse		Mecklenburg	Boydton		NRHP-listed (refnum 75002025).
Middlesex County Courthouse		Middlesex	Saluda		NRHP-listed (refnum 78003029).
Middlesex County Courthouse		Middlesex	Urbanna		NRHP-listed (refnum 76002114).
Nelson County Courthouse		Nelson	Lovingston		NRHP-listed (refnum 73002041).
Northampton County Courthouse Historic District		Northampton	Eastville		NRHP-listed (refnum 72001410).
Nottoway County Courthouse		Nottoway	Nottoway		NRHP-listed (refnum 73002045).
Orange County Courthouse		Orange	Orange		NRHP-listed (refnum 79003062).
Page County Courthouse		Page	Luray		NRHP-listed (refnum 73002047).
Patrick County Courthouse		Patrick	Stuart		NRHP-listed (refnum 74002142).
Pittsylvania County Courthouse		Pittsylvania	Chatham		NRHP-listed (refnum 81000643).
Prince George County Courthouse Historic District		Prince George	Prince George		NRHP-listed (refnum 3000570).
Prince William County Courthouse		Prince William	Manassas		NRHP-listed (refnum 4000039).
Pulaski County Courthouse		Pulaski	Pulaski		NRHP-listed (refnum 82004582).
Richmond County Courthouse		Richmond	Warsaw		NRHP-listed (refnum 72001413).
Rappahannock County Courthouse		Rappahannock	Contributing building in NRHP-listed Washington Historic District		
Old Roanoke County Courthouse		Roanoke	Salem		NRHP-listed (refnum 87000727).
Rockingham County Courthouse		Rockingham	Harrisonburg		NRHP-listed (refnum 82004566).
Old Russell County Courthouse		Russell	Dickensonville		NRHP-listed (refnum 73002059).
Shenandoah County Courthouse		Shenandoah	Woodstock		NRHP-listed (refnum 73002060).
Surry County Courthouse Complex		Surry	Surry		NRHP-listed (refnum 86000719).
Sussex County Courthouse Historic District		Sussex	Sussex		NRHP-listed (refnum 73002066).
Warren County Courthouse		Warren	Front Royal		NRHP-listed (refnum 28).
Warwick County Courthouses		Warwick	Newport News		NRHP-listed (refnum 88002186).
Wise County Courthouse		Wise	Wise		NRHP-listed (refnum 81000649).

== Washington ==
Federal courthouses in the state of Washington are listed here.

County courthouses in Washington are listed here.

== West Virginia ==
Federal courthouses in West Virginia are listed here.

County and other courthouses include:

Courthouse	Image	County	Location	Built	Notes
Barbour County Courthouse		Barbour	Philippi; 39°9′9″N 80°2′21″W	1903-05	Richardsonian Romanesque. NRHP-listed (refnum 80004014).
Boone County Courthouse		Boone	Madison; 38°3′59″N 81°49′8″W	1921	Neo-Classical Revival. NRHP-listed (refnum 81000596).
Cabell County Courthouse		Cabell	Huntington		NRHP-listed (refnum 82004313).
Old Clay County Courthouse		Clay	Clay		NRHP-listed (refnum 79002573).
Doddridge County Courthouse		Doddridge	West Union		NRHP-listed (refnum 82004316).
Fayette County Courthouse		Fayette	Fayetteville		NRHP-listed (refnum 78002793).
Grant County Courthouse		Grant	Petersburg		NRHP-listed (refnum 79003306).
Greenbrier County Courthouse and Lewis Spring		Greenbrier	Lewisburg		NRHP-listed (refnum 73001900).
Hampshire County Courthouse		Hampshire	Romney		NRHP-listed (refnum 5001006).
Old Hardy County Courthouse		Hardy	Moorefield		NRHP-listed (refnum 74002002).
Jefferson County Courthouse		Jefferson	Charles Town		NRHP-listed (refnum 73001910).
Kanawha County Courthouse		Kanawha	Charleston		NRHP-listed (refnum 78002801).
Marion County Courthouse and Sheriff's House		Marion	Fairmont		NRHP-listed (refnum 79003149).
McDowell County Courthouse		McDowell	Welch		NRHP-listed (refnum 79003256).
Mercer County Courthouse		Mercer	Princeton		NRHP-listed (refnum 80004032).
Mineral County Courthouse		Mineral	Keyser		NRHP-listed (refnum 5001005).
Monongalia County Courthouse		Monongalia	Morgantown		NRHP-listed (refnum 85001525).
Morgan County Courthouse		Morgan	Berkeley Springs		NRHP-listed (refnum 5001004). Demolished in 2006 due to fire.
Nicholas County Courthouse		Nicholas	Summersville		NRHP-listed (refnum 91001014).
Pleasants County Courthouse		Pleasants	St. Marys		NRHP-listed (refnum 4000917).
Pocahontas County Courthouse and Jail		Pocahontas	Marlinton		NRHP-listed (refnum 94000724).
Putnam County Courthouse		Putnam	Winfield		NRHP-listed (refnum 775).
Randolph County Courthouse and Jail		Randolph	Elkins		NRHP-listed (refnum 80004041).
Ritchie County Courthouse		Ritchie	Harrisville		NRHP-listed (refnum 4000916).
Summers County Courthouse		Summers	Hinton		NRHP-listed (refnum 81000608).
Tucker County Courthouse and Jail		Tucker	Parsons		NRHP-listed (refnum 84003680).
Tyler County Courthouse and Jail		Tyler	Middlebourne		NRHP-listed (refnum 80004044).
Wirt County Courthouse		Wirt	Elizabeth		NRHP-listed (refnum 4000918).
Wood County Courthouse		Wood	Parkersburg		NRHP-listed (refnum 79002606).
Wyoming County Courthouse and Jail		Wyoming	Pineville		NRHP-listed (refnum 79002607).

== Wisconsin ==
Federal courthouses in Wisconsin are listed here.

County and any other courthouses include:

Courthouse	Image	County	Location	Built	Notes
Adams County Courthouse		Adams	Friendship; 43°58′14.94″N 89°48′54.65″W	1914	Designed by Arthur Peabody. NRHP-listed (refnum 82000627).
Ashland County Courthouse		Ashland	Ashland		NRHP-listed (refnum 82000628).
Bayfield County Courthouse		Bayfield	Washburn; 46°40′37″N 90°53′33″W	1894-96	NRHP-listed (refnum 75000060).
Old Bayfield County Courthouse		Bayfield	Bayfield |l	1884	NRHP-listed (refnum 74000058).
Brown County Courthouse		Brown	Green Bay	1908	NRHP-listed (refnum 76000053).
Calumet County Courthouse		Calumet	Chilton	1913	NRHP-listed (refnum 82000640).
Crawford County Courthouse		Crawford	Prairie du Chien	1896 (current building)	NRHP-listed (refnum 82000645).
Douglas County Courthouse		Douglas	Superior	1918	NRHP-listed (refnum 82000664).
Florence County Courthouse and Jail		Florence	Florence	1889	NRHP-listed (refnum 85003029).
Grant County Courthouse		Grant	Lancaster	1902	NRHP-listed (refnum 78000096).
Green County Courthouse		Green	Monroe	1891	NRHP-listed (refnum 78000097).
Green Lake County Courthouse		Green Lake	Green Lake	1899	NRHP-listed (refnum 82000672).
Iowa County Courthouse		Iowa	Dodgeville	1893	NRHP-listed (refnum 72000053).
Old Iron County Courthouse		Iron	Hurley	1892-1893	NRHP-listed (refnum 77000031).
Juneau County Courthouse		Juneau	Mauston	1938-1941	NRHP-listed (refnum 82001846).
Kenosha County Courthouse and Jail		Kenosha	Kenosha	1923-1925	NRHP-listed (refnum 82000677).
Lafayette County Courthouse		Lafayette	Darlington	1905-1907	NRHP-listed (refnum 78000114).
Langlade County Courthouse		Langlade	Antigo	1905	NRHP-listed (refnum 77000034).
Lincoln County Courthouse		Lincoln	Merrill; 45.181111°N 89.683889°W	1903	Beaux-Arts courthouse designed by Van Ryn & DeGelleke and built in 1903. NRHP-listed.
Manitowoc County Courthouse		Manitowoc	Manitowoc	1906	NRHP-listed (refnum 81000047).
Marquette County Courthouse and Marquette County Sheriff's Office and Jail		Marquette	Montello	1904	NRHP-listed (refnum 82000685).
Milwaukee County Courthouse		Milwaukee	Milwaukee	1931	NRHP-listed (refnum 82000687).
Monroe County Courthouse		Monroe	Sparta	1895	NRHP-listed (refnum 82000689).
Oconto County Courthouse		Oconto	Oconto	1891	NRHP-listed (refnum 82000690).
Oneida County Courthouse		Oneida	Rhinelander	1908-1910	NRHP-listed (refnum 81000052).
Old Ozaukee County Courthouse		Ozaukee	Port Washington	1901-1902	NRHP-listed (refnum 76000071).
Pepin County Courthouse and Jail		Pepin	Durand	1873-1874	NRHP-listed (refnum 82000695).
Pierce County Courthouse		Pierce	Ellsworth	1905	NRHP-listed (refnum 82000696).
Geiger Building--Old Polk County Courthouse		Polk	Osceola		NRHP-listed (refnum 85003030).
Polk County Courthouse		Polk	Balsam Lake	1899	NRHP-listed (refnum 82000697).
Racine County Courthouse		Racine	Racine	1931	NRHP-listed (refnum 80000179).
Sauk County Courthouse		Sauk	Baraboo	1906	NRHP-listed (refnum 82000711).
Sheboygan County Courthouse		Sheboygan	Sheboygan	1933	NRHP-listed (refnum 82000713).
St Croix County Courthouse		St Croix	Hudson	1900	NRHP-listed (refnum 82000710).
Taylor County Courthouse		Taylor	Medford	1914	NRHP-listed (refnum 80000198).
Vernon County Courthouse		Vernon	Viroqua	1880	NRHP-listed (refnum 80000200).
Washington County Courthouse and Jail		Washington	West Bend	1886	NRHP-listed (refnum 82000718).
Old Waukesha County Courthouse		Waukesha	Waukesha; 43.0125°N 88.226944°W	1889, 1893, 1938	Richardsonian Romanesque style, with sections built in 1885, 1893, and 1938. NRHP-listed.
Waushara County Courthouse		Waushara	Wautoma; 44°4′25″N 89°17′24″W	1928	Classical Revival. NRHP-listed.
Winnebago County Courthouse		Winnebago	Oshkosh		NRHP-listed (refnum 82000736).

== Wyoming ==
Federal courthouses in Wyoming are listed here.

County and other courthouses include:

Courthouse	Image	County	Location	Built	Notes
Albany County Courthouse		Albany	Laramie; 41°18′40.6″N 105°35′25.1″W		
Big Horn County Courthouse		Big Horn	Basin; 44°22′54.4″N 108°2′25.5″W		
Campbell County Courthouse		Campbell	Gillette; 44°17′23.5″N 105°30′16.9″W		
Carbon County Courthouse		Carbon	Rawlins; 41°47′24.5″N 107°14′25.8″W		
Converse County Courthouse		Converse	Douglas; 42°45′35.1″N 105°22′51.3″W		
Crook County Courthouse		Crook	Sundance; 44°24′19.2″N 104°22′42.9″W		
Fremont County Courthouse		Fremont	Lander; 42°50′9.1″N 108°43′35.1″W		
Goshen County Courthouse		Goshen	Torrington; 42°03′55.9″N 104°10′56.3″W		
Hot Springs County Courthouse		Hot Springs	Thermopolis; 43°38′48.9″N 108°12′32.2″W		
Johnson County Courthouse		Johnson	Buffalo; 44°20′52″N 106°41′56″W	1884	Italianate. Listed on the National Register of Historic Places.
Laramie County Courthouse		Laramie	Cheyenne; 41°08′7.0″N 104°49′8.3″W		
Lincoln County Courthouse		Lincoln	Kemmerer; 41°47′37″N 110°32′26″W	1925	Beaux Arts, Classical Revival. Listed on the National Register of Historic Places.
Old Natrona County Courthouse		Natrona	Casper; 42°51′5.6″N 106°19′31.8″W	1941	
Townsend Justice Center		Natrona	Casper; 42°51′2.2″N 106°19′29.2″W		Listed on the National Register of Historic Places.
Niobrara County Courthouse		Niobrara	Lusk; 42°51′5.6″N 106°19′31.8″W	1920	
Park County Courthouse		Park	Cody; 44°31′31.8″N 109°04′1.6″W		
Platte County Courthouse		Platte	Wheatland; 42°03′20.7″N 104°57′10.2″W	1918	Listed on the National Register of Historic Places.
Sheridan County Courthouse		Sheridan	Sheridan; 44°47′42.0″N 106°57′23.7″W	1905	Listed on the National Register of Historic Places.
Sublette County Courthouse		Sublette	Pinedale; 42°51′58.4″N 109°51′38.9″W		
Sweetwater County Courthouse		Sweetwater	Green River; 41°31′47.2″N 109°28′3.8″W		
Teton County Courthouse		Teton	Jackson; 43°28′39.9″N 110°45′36.8″W		
Uinta County Courthouse		Uinta	Evanston; 41°15′59.2″N 110°57′54.1″W	1873	Listed on the National Register of Historic Places.
Washakie County Courthouse		Washakie	Worland; 44°01′2.1″N 107°57′18.8″W		
Weston County Courthouse		Weston	Newcastle; 43°51′21.2″N 104°12′9.0″W	1911	Listed on the National Register of Historic Places.

== United States territories ==
Federal courthouses in United States territories are listed here.

Other courthouses include:

Courthouse	Image	Location	Built	Notes
District Courthouse		Progreso, Aguadilla, Puerto Rico; 18°25′36″N 67°8′48″W	1925	Designed by Rafael Carmoega. Second floor is now an art museum. NRHP-listed (refnum 85000041).
Humacao District Courthouse		Humacao, Puerto Rico; 18°9′5″N 65°49′28″W	1925	Designed by Rafael Carmoega in Classical Revival style. Also known as "Casa Alcaldia de Humacao". NRHP-listed (refnum 85000041).
Supreme Court Building (Puerto Rico)		San Juan, Puerto Rico; 18°27′54″N 66°5′19″W	1955	Designed by Osvaldo Toro and Miguel Ferrer in Modern Movement style. It has an unusual circular courtroom. NRHP-listed (refnum 06000506).

== See also ==
- List of courthouses (worldwide)
- List of United States federal courthouses
- List of the oldest courthouses in the United States
