= Cheatham County Courthouse =

Courthouse in Ashland City, Tennessee, US

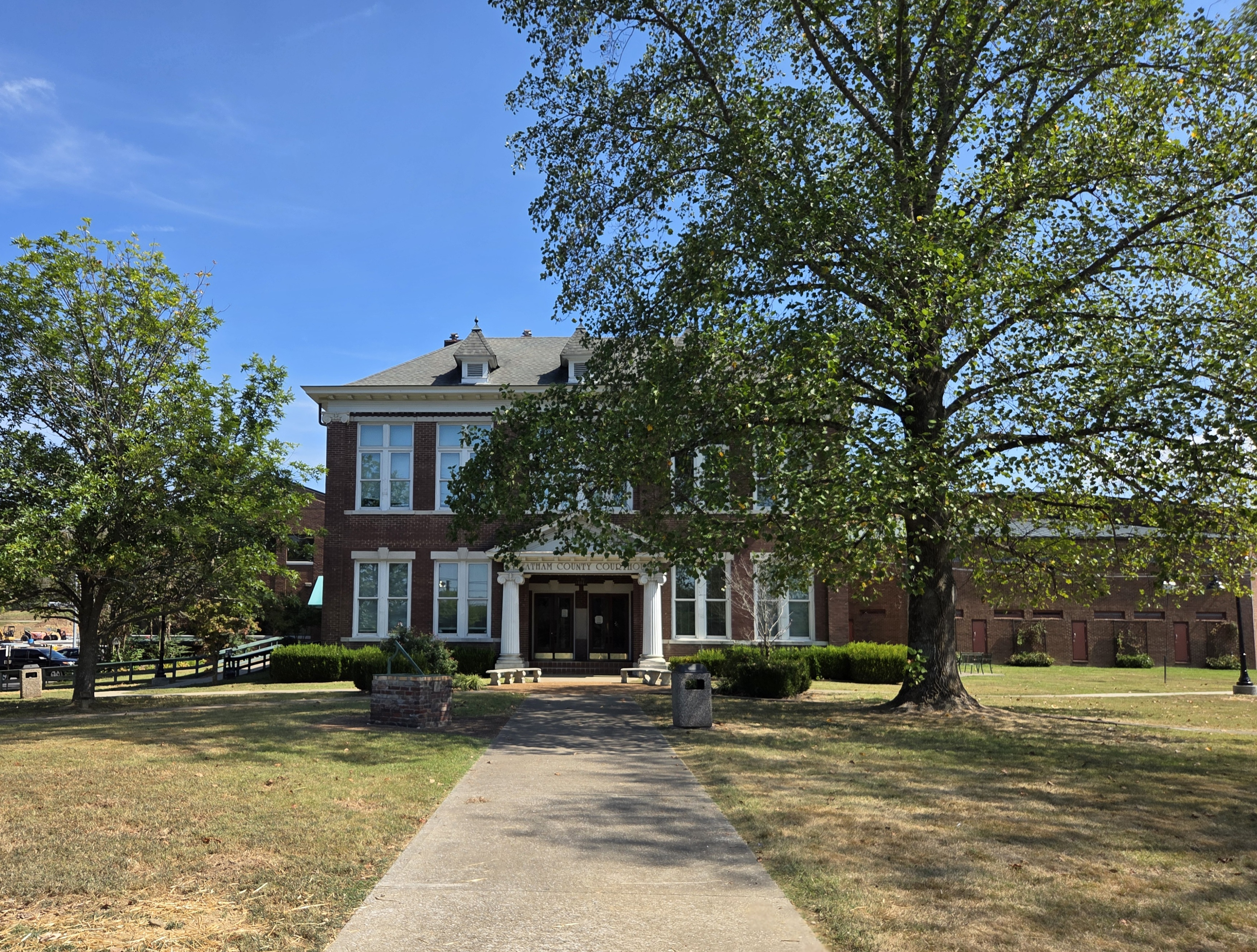
- The courthouse in 2025

- Location within Tennessee Location within the United States

General information
- Architectural style: Colonial Revival, Greek Revival, Italianate
- Location: 100 Public Square, Ashland City, Tennessee, United States
- Coordinates: 36.274722°N 87.063611°W
- Completed: 1869
- Renovated: 1914
- Owner: Cheatham County, Tennessee

Technical details
- Floor count: 2

Design and construction
- Architect: Robert E. Turberville (1914 addition)
- Cheatham County Courthouse
- U.S. National Register of Historic Places
- NRHP reference No.: 76001769
- Added to NRHP: December 12, 1976

The Cheatham County Courthouse is a courthouse in Ashland City, Tennessee. The original seat of government for Cheatham County, the courthouse was placed on the National Register of Historic Places in 1976.

After Cheatham County was founded in 1856, plans began for a courthouse in Ashland (now Ashland City). The original courthouse was completed in 1869 for a cost of $12,000. It is a two-story, brick, rectangular structure in the Greek Revival-Italianate style.

A renovation was undertaken in the early 1900s, which added a large addition on the southwest side of the courthouse. This addition, designed by Robert E. Turberville, also has two stories. The main facade features a portico and Ionic columns.

Currently the building houses the Cheatham County courts and general sessions. The courthouse also features a front lawn that has served as a social gathering spot.

== See also ==
- List of courthouses in the United States
