= Calloway County Courthouse =

- U.S. National Register of Historic Places
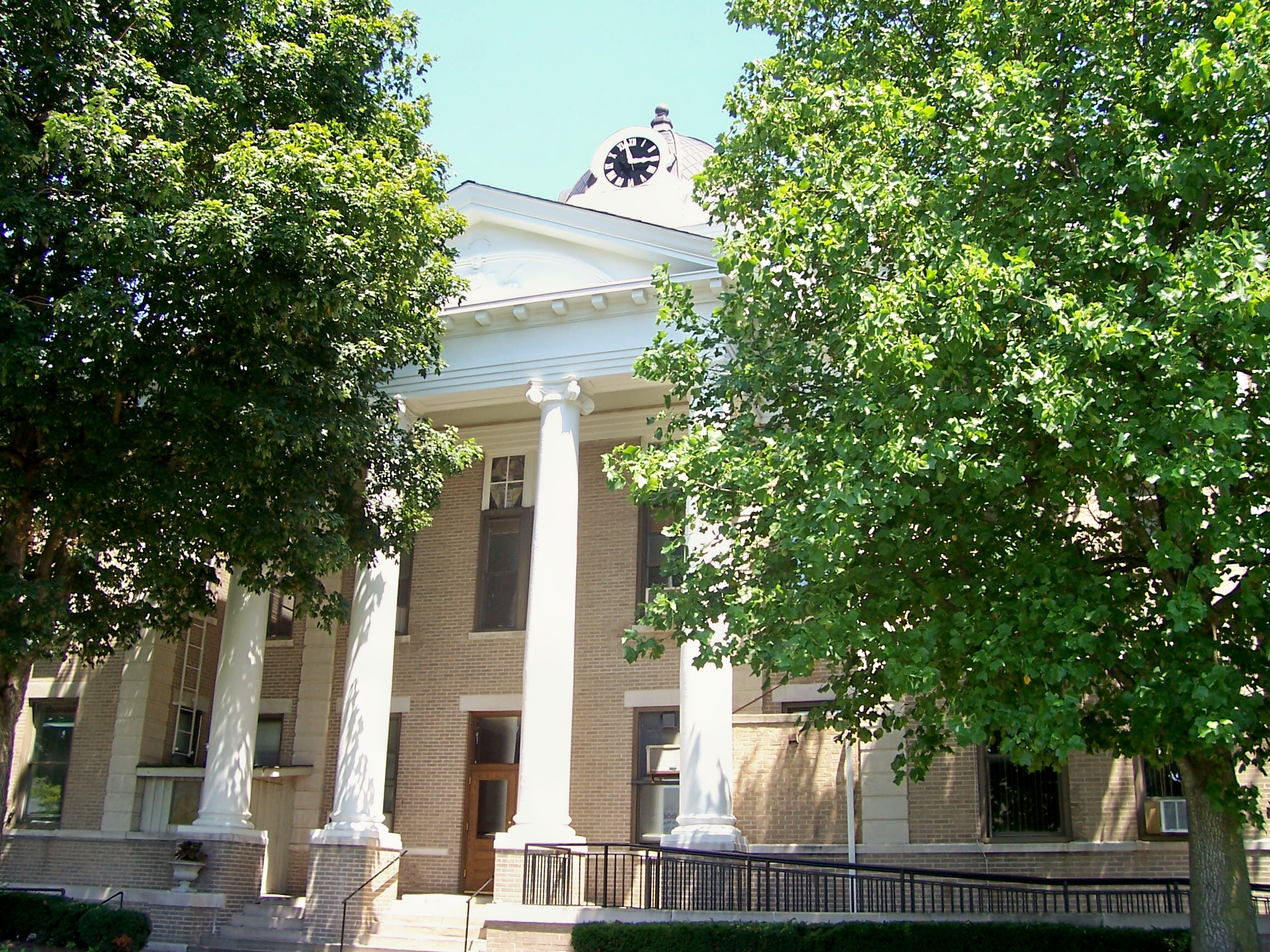

- Location within Kentucky Location within the United States
- Location: Town Sq., Murray, Kentucky
- Coordinates: 36°36′37″N 88°18′08″W
- Area: 1 acre (0.40 ha)
- Built: 1913
- Architectural style: Classical Revival
- MPS: Murray Kentucky MRA
- NRHP reference No.: 86000287
- Added to NRHP: February 19, 1986

The Calloway County Courthouse is a courthouse in Murray, Kentucky built in 1913. It was listed on the National Register of Historic Places in 1986.

It was the result of blatant election tampering, in which votes on bond authorization were falsified. Voters had actually turned down the funding for a replacement to the previous courthouse which had burned in 1906. Proponents of the new courthouse cheated to get what they wanted.

It is a three-story brick building designed in Classical Revival style
