= Alamosa County Courthouse =

- U.S. National Register of Historic Places
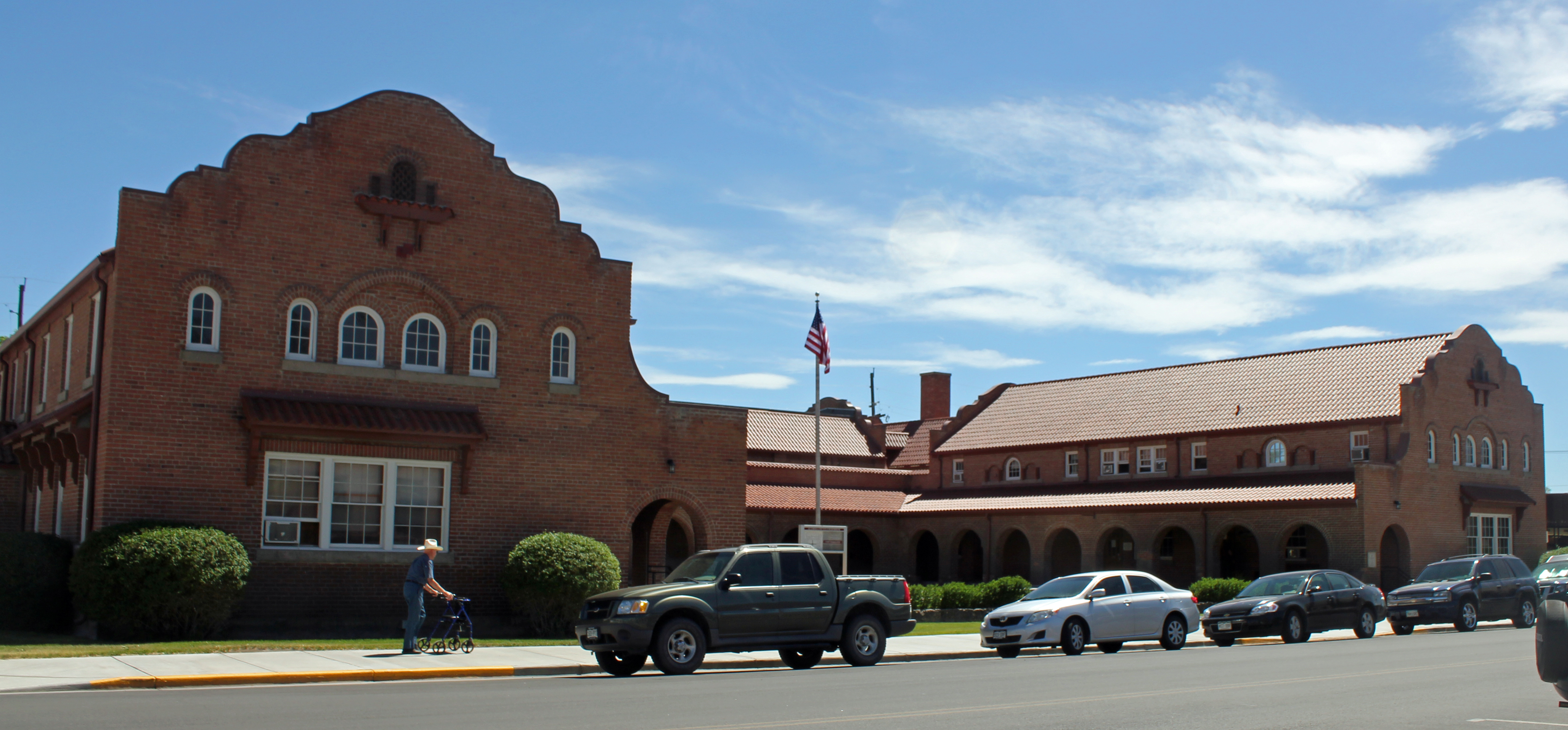

- Location within Colorado
- Location: 702 Fourth St., Alamosa, Colorado
- Coordinates: 37°28′08″N 105°52′02″W
- Area: less than one acre
- Built by: WPA
- Architectural style: Mission Revival
- NRHP reference No.: 95001149
- Added to NRHP: September 29, 1995

The Alamosa County Courthouse, at 702 Fourth St. in Alamosa, Colorado, was listed on the National Register of Historic Places in 1995.

It is a U-shaped two-story complex, made up of three separate buildings joined by covered walkways, plus a fourth separate jail building. It was built during 1937 to 1938. It was a Works Progress Administration project. It was deemed a good example of Mission Revival architecture.
