= Park County Courthouse and Jail =

- U.S. National Register of Historic Places
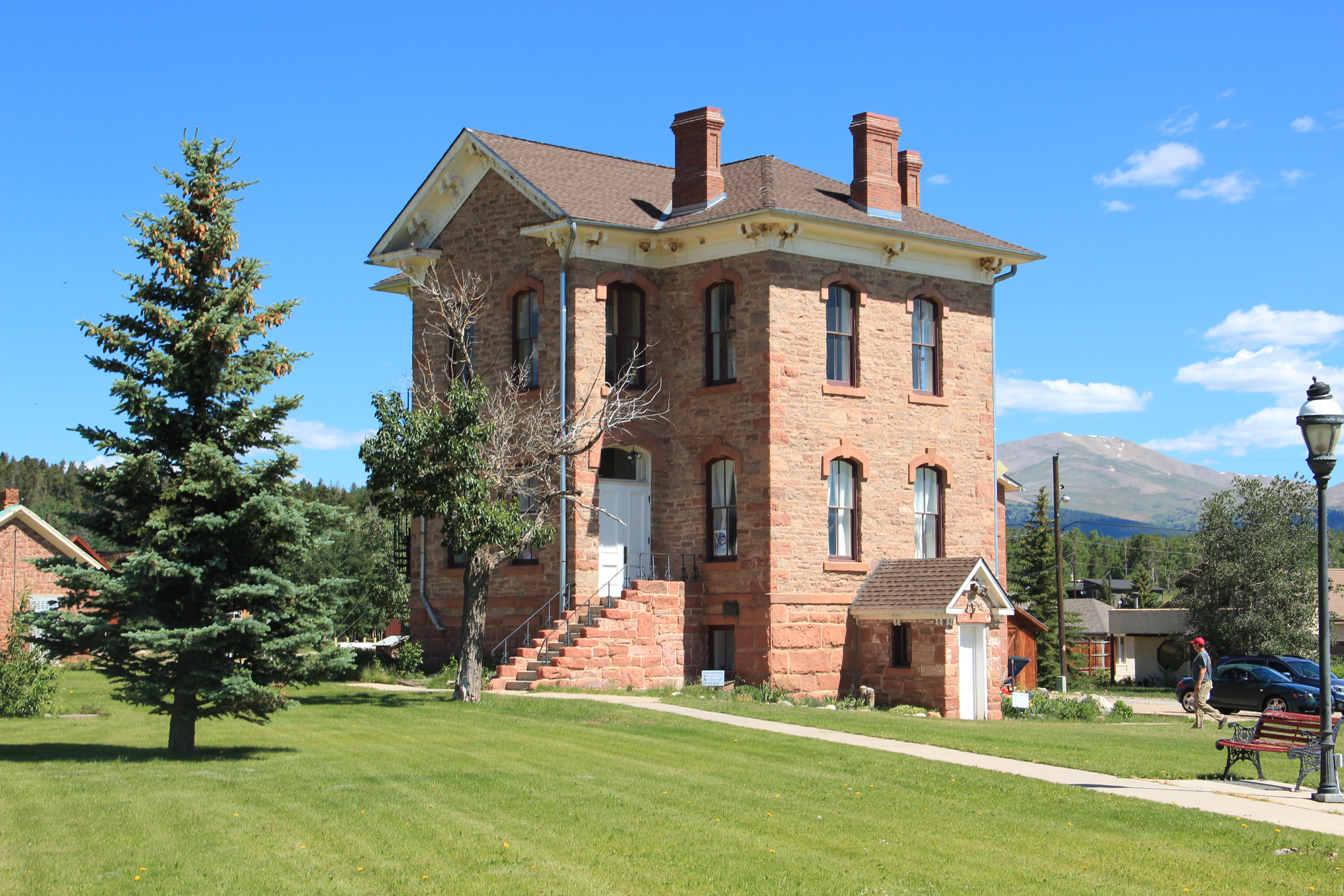

- Location within Colorado
- Location: 418 Main St., Fairplay, Colorado
- Coordinates: 39°13′32″N 106°00′06″W
- Area: 1.5 acres (0.61 ha)
- Built: 1874
- Built by: Robert Frazier, Lewis W. Lewis
- Architect: George W. Nice
- NRHP reference No.: 79000618
- Added to NRHP: May 25, 1979

The Park County Courthouse and Jail in Fairplay, Colorado was built in 1874. It was listed on the National Register of Historic Places in 1979.

When listed in 1979, the courthouse was the oldest operating courthouse in the state.

The courthouse is a squarish two-story building with a full basement. The jail is a one-story gabled stone structure.
