= Wayne County Courthouse District =

Local government building in the United States

- U.S. National Register of Historic Places
- U.S. Historic district
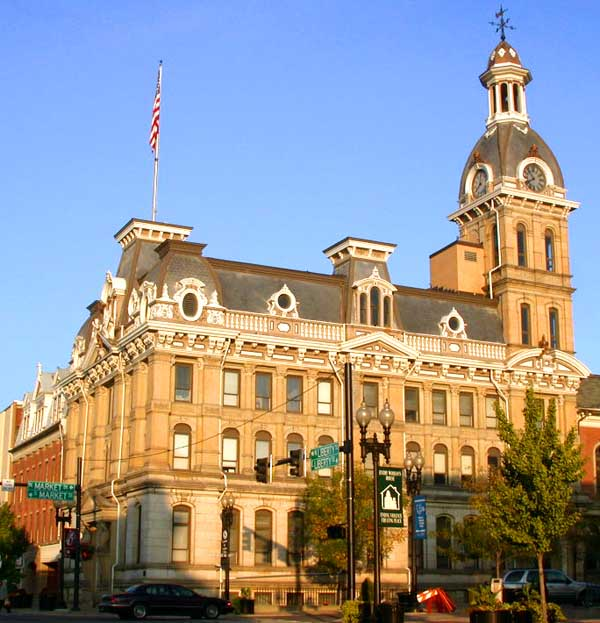
- Wayne County Courthouse

- Location within Ohio Location within the United States
- Location: Wooster, Ohio
- Coordinates: 40°47′55″N 81°56′26″W
- Built: 1877–1879
- Architect: Boyd, Thomas; Et al.
- Architectural style: Second Empire
- NRHP reference No.: 73001551
- Added to NRHP: July 26, 1973

The Wayne County Courthouse is located in Wooster, Ohio and was constructed to Thomas Boyd's design from 1877 to 1879. The building is designed in classic Second Empire style and is composed of sandstone. The architect originally designed a symmetrical building separate from the old north annex of the previous courthouse. The reluctant county officials cited money issues and ordered the new building to be built connected to the old, thus giving it an offset appearance.

The entrances are flanked by the Atlantes supporting a pediment. The first floor consists of smooth stone blocks. The windows are high arched and set back into the wall, above each is a small arch with a decorative keystone.

The second and third floor is of a rougher, darker stone than the first. Doric and Corinthian columns flank the windows around the facade. The second floor windows are high arched and recessed. Here the buildings on either side of the tower differ, the northern half ending with a hipped roof, the southern half continuing on above.

The third floor of the southern end contains rectangular recessed windows, the roof resting on a decorative moulding above. On the southern side sits a broken pediment with a griffin peering out below. Resting on the pediment are two figures representing Justice, one holding the scales of justice, the other the Ten Commandments. The windows peeking out of the roof are round portholes.

A high tower sits, oddly enough, at the end of the roofing detail, but correctly in the middle of the court complex. It rests on a broken pediment containing an urn. The tower rises two levels to become a clock tower, and then curves in to brace a cupola with a weather vane capping it.
