= Claiborne Cottage Hotel =

- U.S. National Register of Historic Places
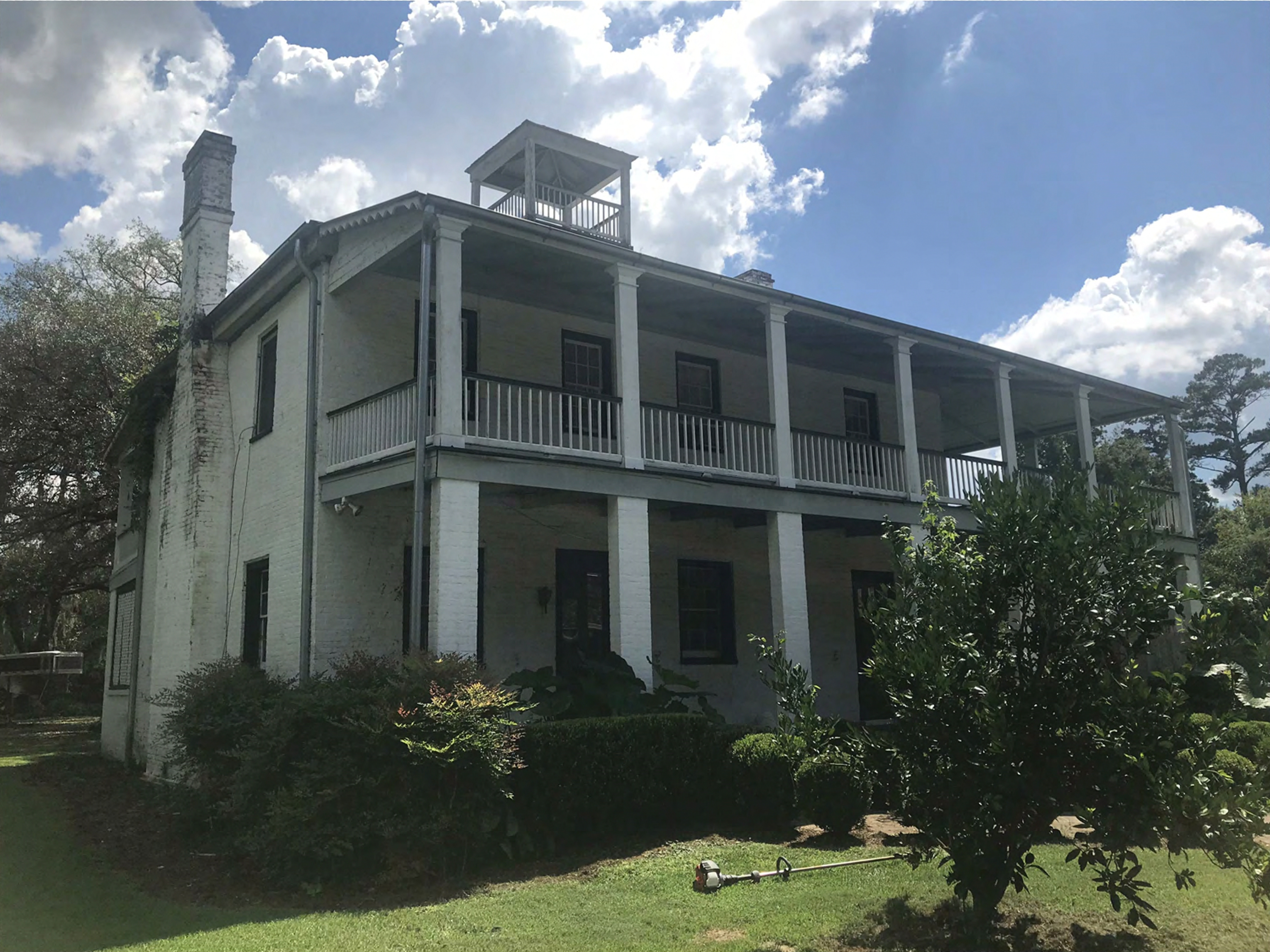

- Location within Louisiana
- Interactive map showing the location of Claiborne Cottage Hotel
- Location: 19130 Rogers Ln., near Covington, Louisiana
- Coordinates: 30.47340°N 90.08817°W
- Area: 7.3 acres (3.0 ha)
- NRHP reference No.: 100004152
- Added to NRHP: July 8, 2019

The Claiborne Cottage Hotel, near Covington in St. Tammany Parish, Louisiana, is a former hotel which was opened in 1880 in the former St. Tammany Parish Courthouse (built 1818–19). It was listed on the National Register of Historic Places in 2019.

It is located on the property of The Chimes, a restaurant and taproom, in a 7.3-acre site that is on the east side of the Bogue Falaya River, across from Covington. It is in an area which was part of a historic Town of Claiborne, which no longer exists.

The courthouse-then-hotel building is a two-story brick masonry building. It was converted into a hotel, the Claiborne Cottage Hotel, in 1880. The hotel was later expanded into a long linear building which thereafter formed the main part of the hotel; this building was destroyed in a fire in 1912.

The property also includes a second contributing building: a one-story wood-frame cottage built c. 1889 in the hotel's expansion. The modern building holding The Chimes restaurant is non-contributing to the historic nature of the property.

It was deemed significant "in the areas of commerce and health/medicine for its late 19th and early 20th century use as a resort hotel. The property is an important and rare survivor of the resorts associated with St. Tammany Parish's history as the 'Ozone Belt,' a health tourism destination that garnered national attention and contributed significantly to the local economy in the late 19th and early 20th centuries."

In 2019, both historic buildings were being used for storage.
