= Sequatchie County Courthouse =

- U.S. National Register of Historic Places
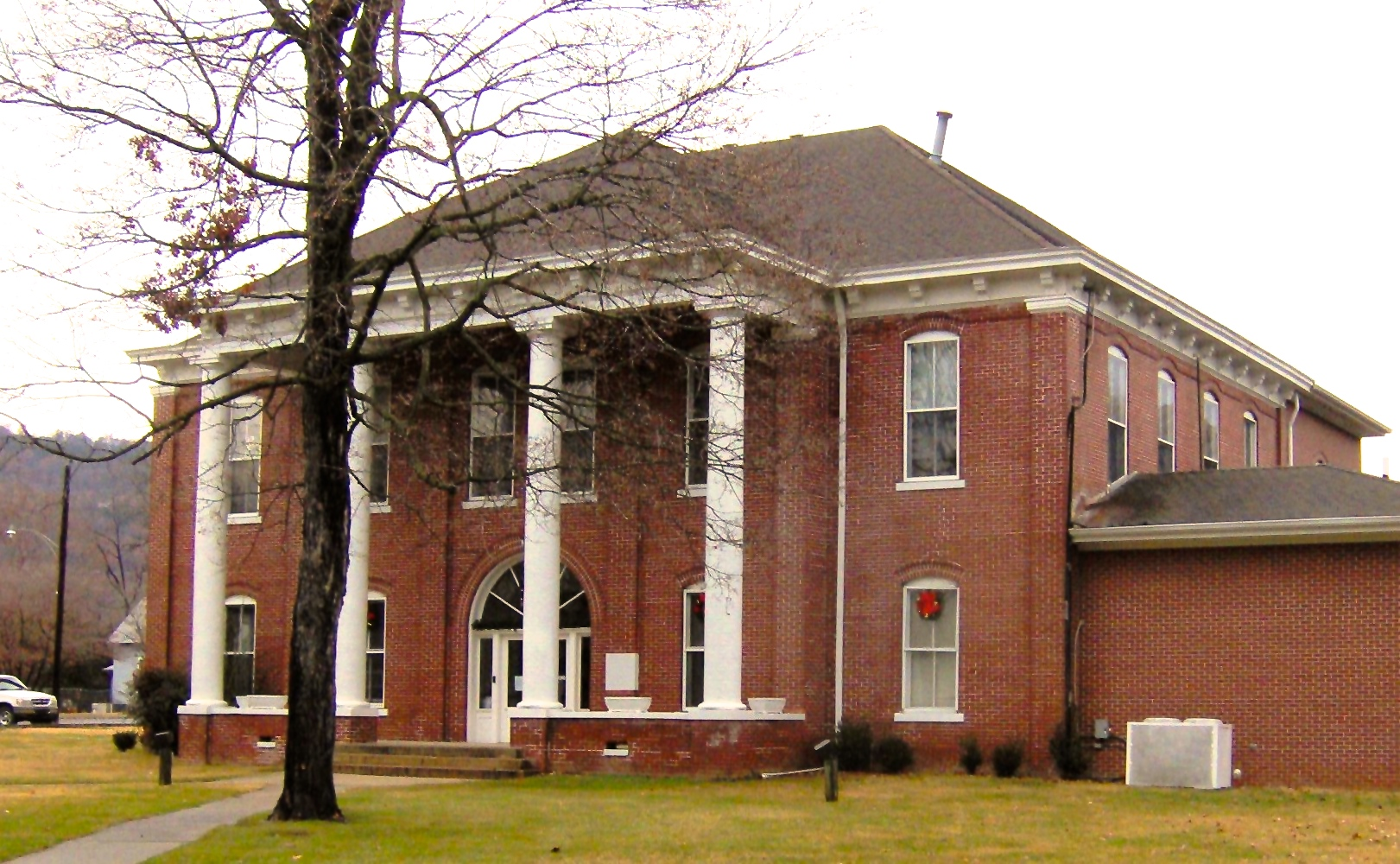

- Location within Tennessee
- Location: Cherry St., Dunlap, Tennessee
- Coordinates: 35°22′17″N 85°23′14″W
- Area: 1.5 acres (0.61 ha)
- Built: 1911
- Built by: W.K. Brown & Bros.
- Architectural style: Colonial Revival
- NRHP reference No.: 80003853
- Added to NRHP: January 20, 1980

The Sequatchie County Courthouse, on Cherry St. in Dunlap, Tennessee is a courthouse which was built in 1911. It was listed on the National Register of Historic Places in 1980.

It was built at cost of $12,000 by W.K. Brown & Bros. contractors. It is Colonial Revival in style.

The property also includes a one-story Board of Education building constructed in 1959. It is brick, with brick laid in stretcher bond, and has a hipped roof which extends over a portico on its northwest side.
