= Somerville Historic District =

Historic district in Tennessee, United States

- U.S. National Register of Historic Places
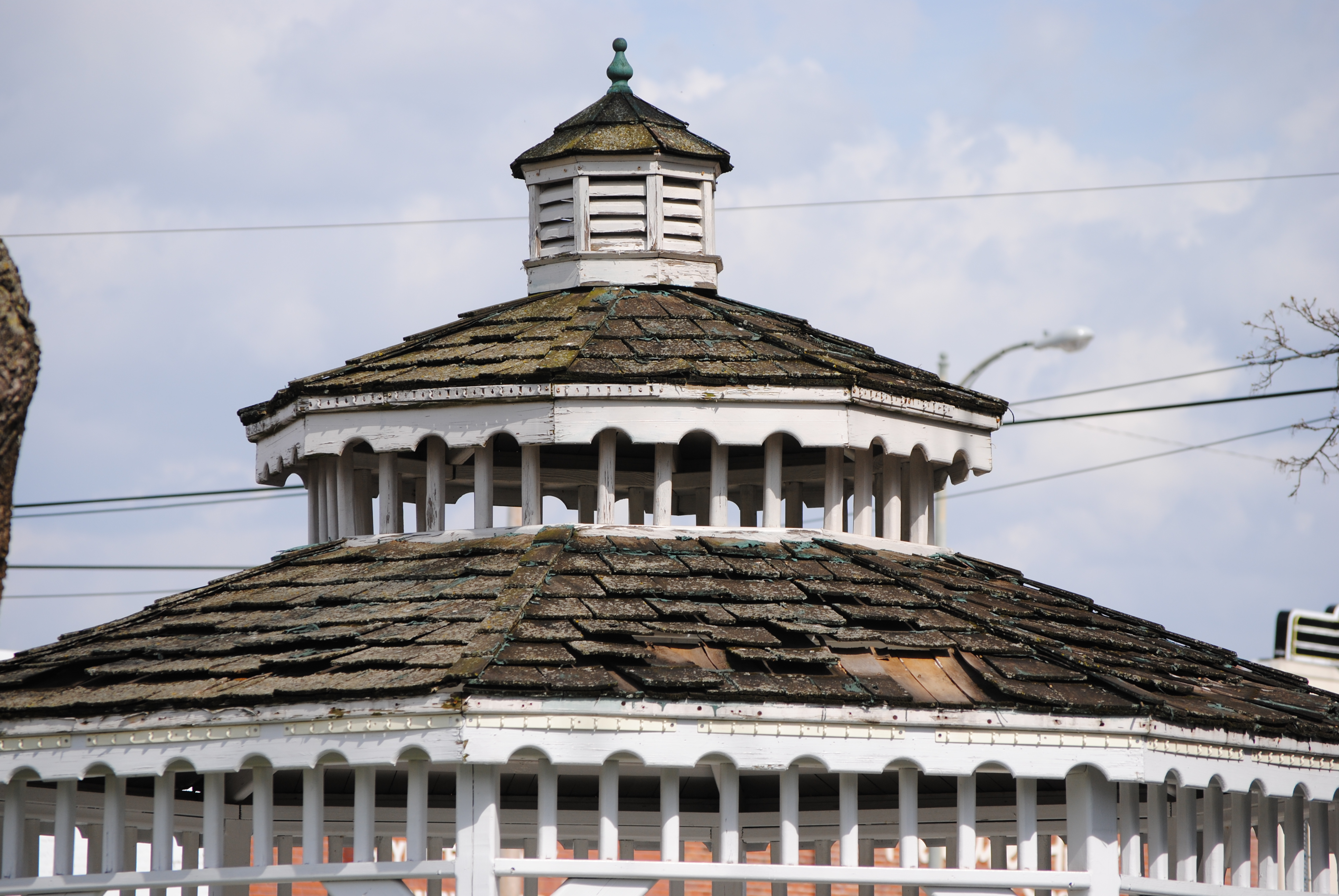
- Courthouse gazebo in district

- Location within Tennessee Location within the United States
- Interactive map showing the location of Somerville Historic District
- Location: Court Square, and irregular pattern along N. Main St., Somerville, Tennessee
- Area: 52 acres (21 ha)
- Architectural style: Late 19th and 20th Century Revivals, Greek Revival, Late Victorian
- NRHP reference No.: 82003968
- Added to NRHP: April 15, 1982

The Somerville Historic District is a 52 acres (21 ha) historic district in Somerville, Tennessee which was listed on the National Register of Historic Places in 1982.

It included 75 contributing buildings, including the Fayette County Courthouse.
