= Vernon Parish Courthouse =

- U.S. National Register of Historic Places
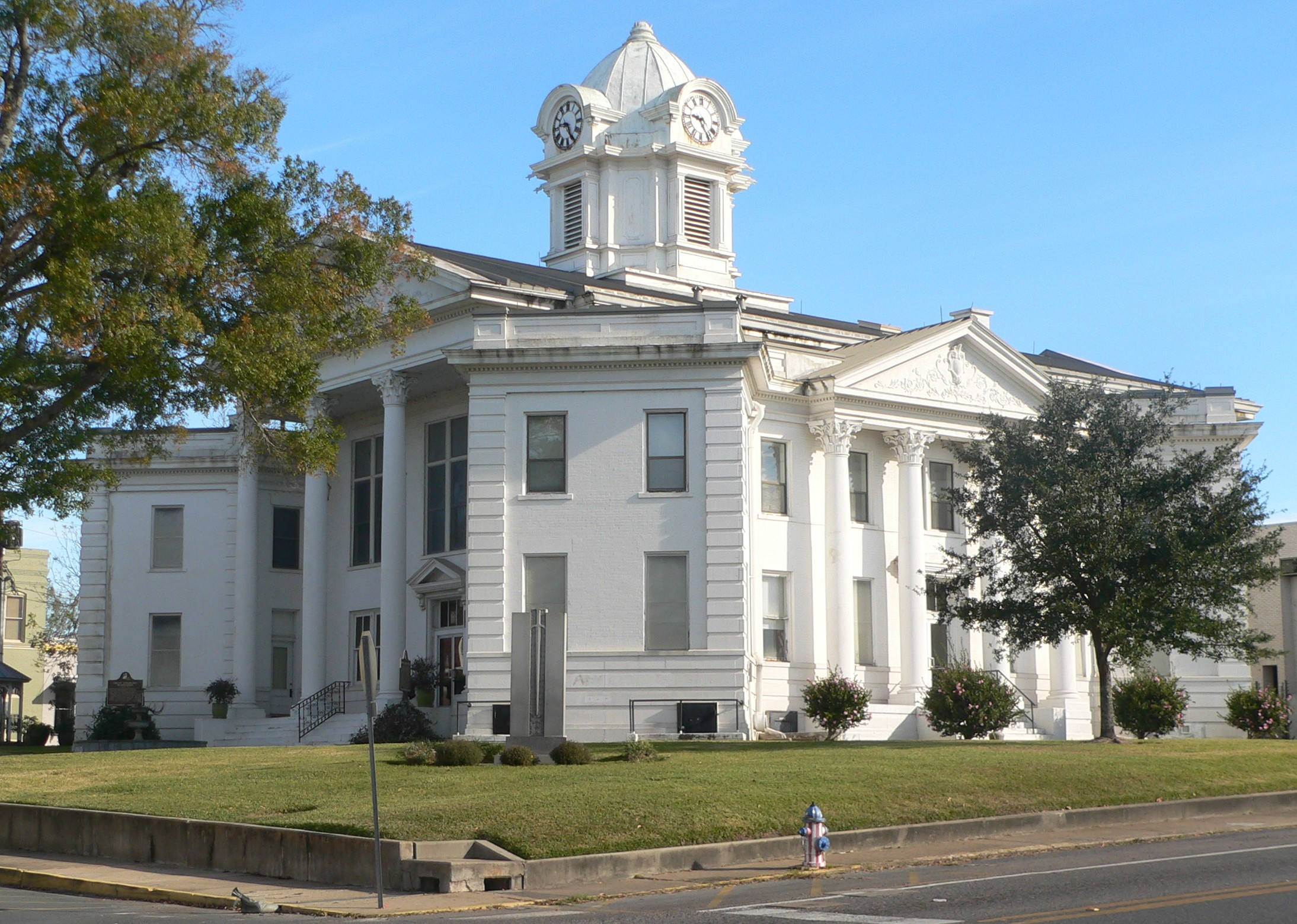
- View from southwest

- Location within Louisiana Location within the United States
- Location: 201 S. 3rd St., Leesville, Louisiana
- Coordinates: 31°8′32″N 93°15′39″W
- Area: 0.8 acres (0.32 ha)
- Built: 1910
- Architectural style: Classical Revival, Neo-classical
- NRHP reference No.: 83000550
- Added to NRHP: September 22, 1983

The Vernon Parish Courthouse, located at 201 S. 3rd St. in Leesville in Vernon Parish, Louisiana, was built in 1910. It was listed on the National Register of Historic Places in 1983 and is part of the 30th Judicial District Court of Louisiana.

The stuccoed masonry courthouse is Classical Revival in style. It has four monumental pedimented porticos on the four sides of the building, each in between small wings that project diagonally at each corner, giving the building an X-shaped plan. It has two main floors, and a third floor Baroque domed cupola with a clock on each face.
