= John P. Eisentraut =

American architect

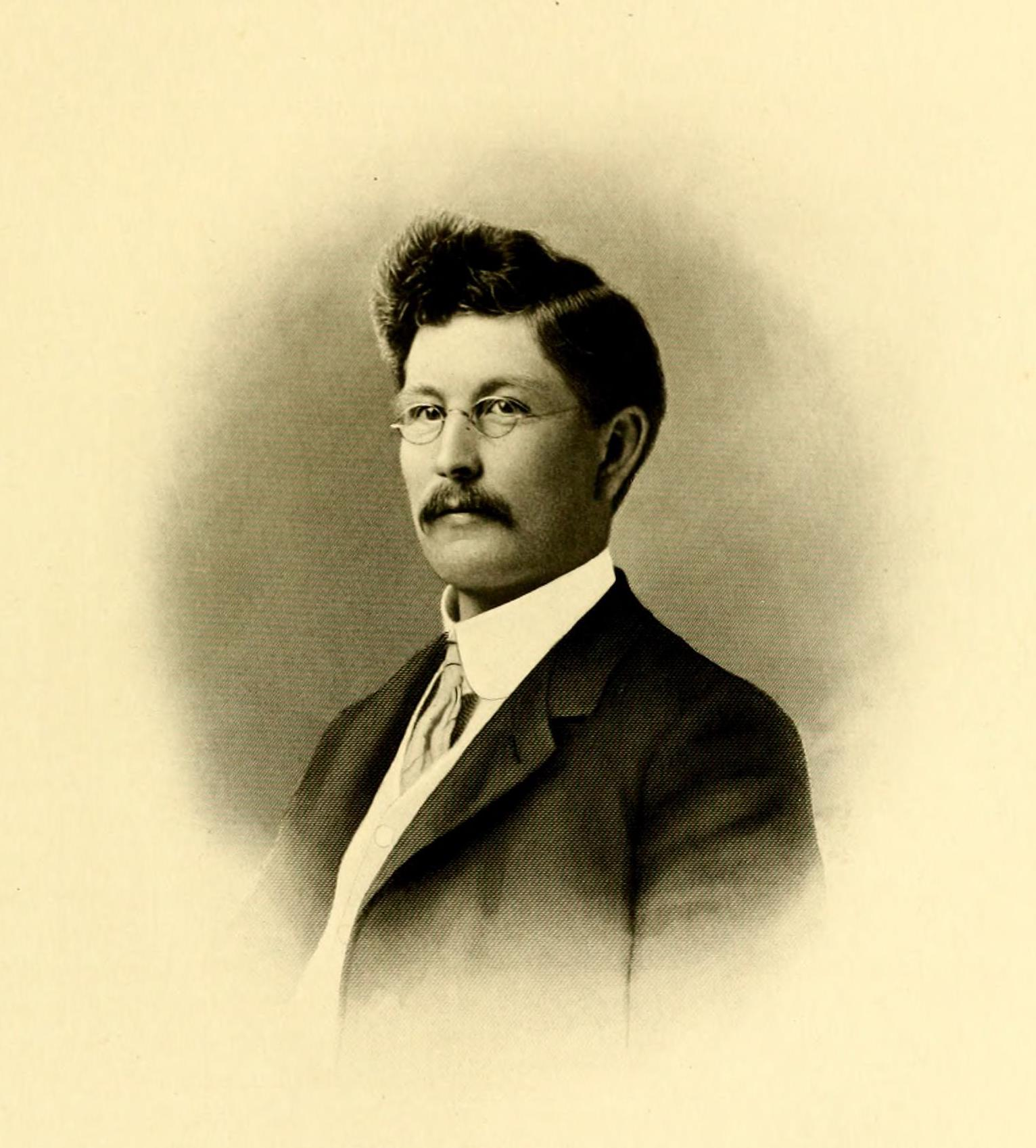
- John P. Eisentraut c. 1904
- Born: April 12, 1870; Maquoketa, Iowa
- Died: May 1, 1958 (aged 88); Hill City, South Dakota
- Occupation: Architect

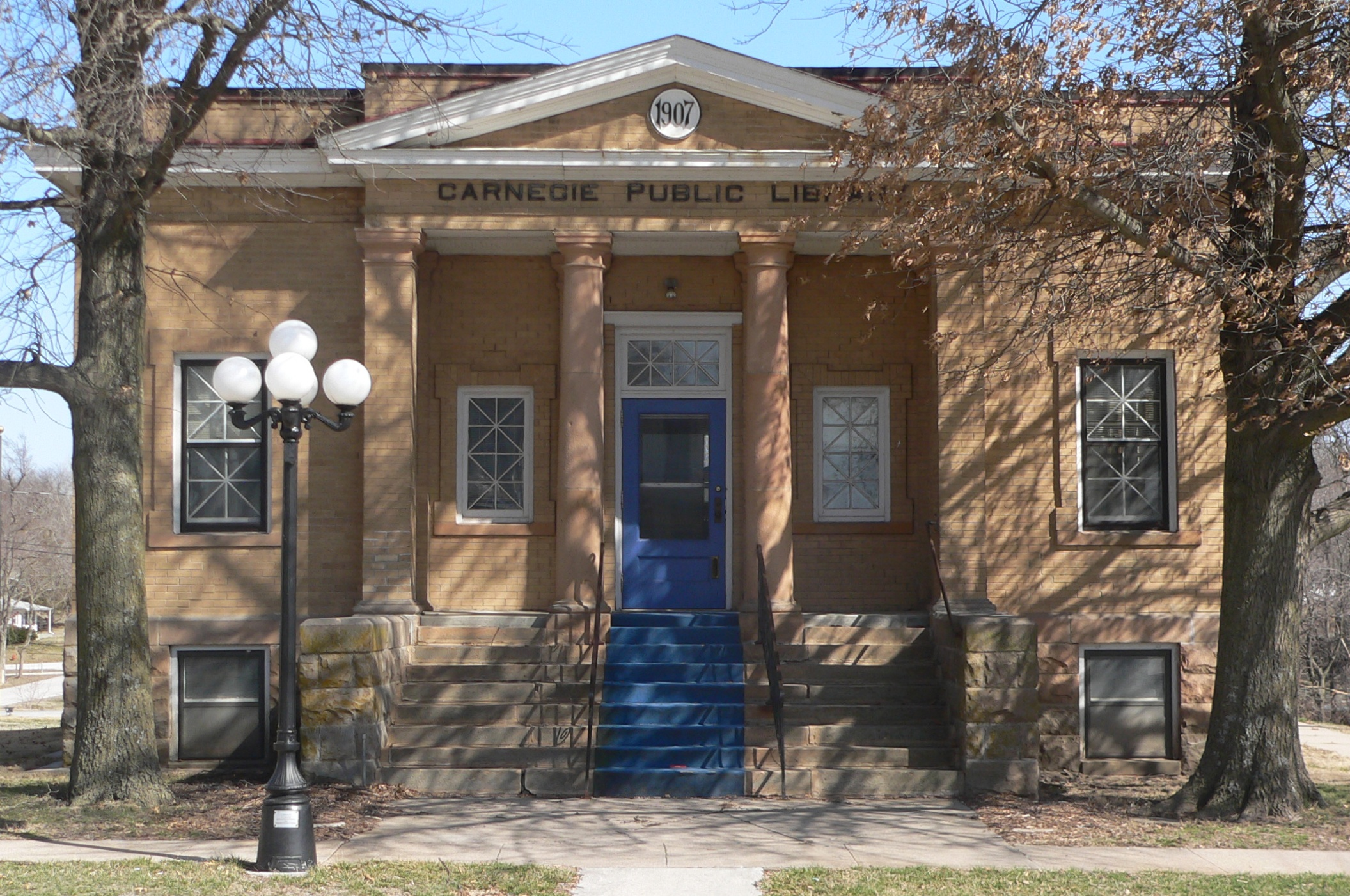
The Pawnee City Carnegie Library, completed in 1908.

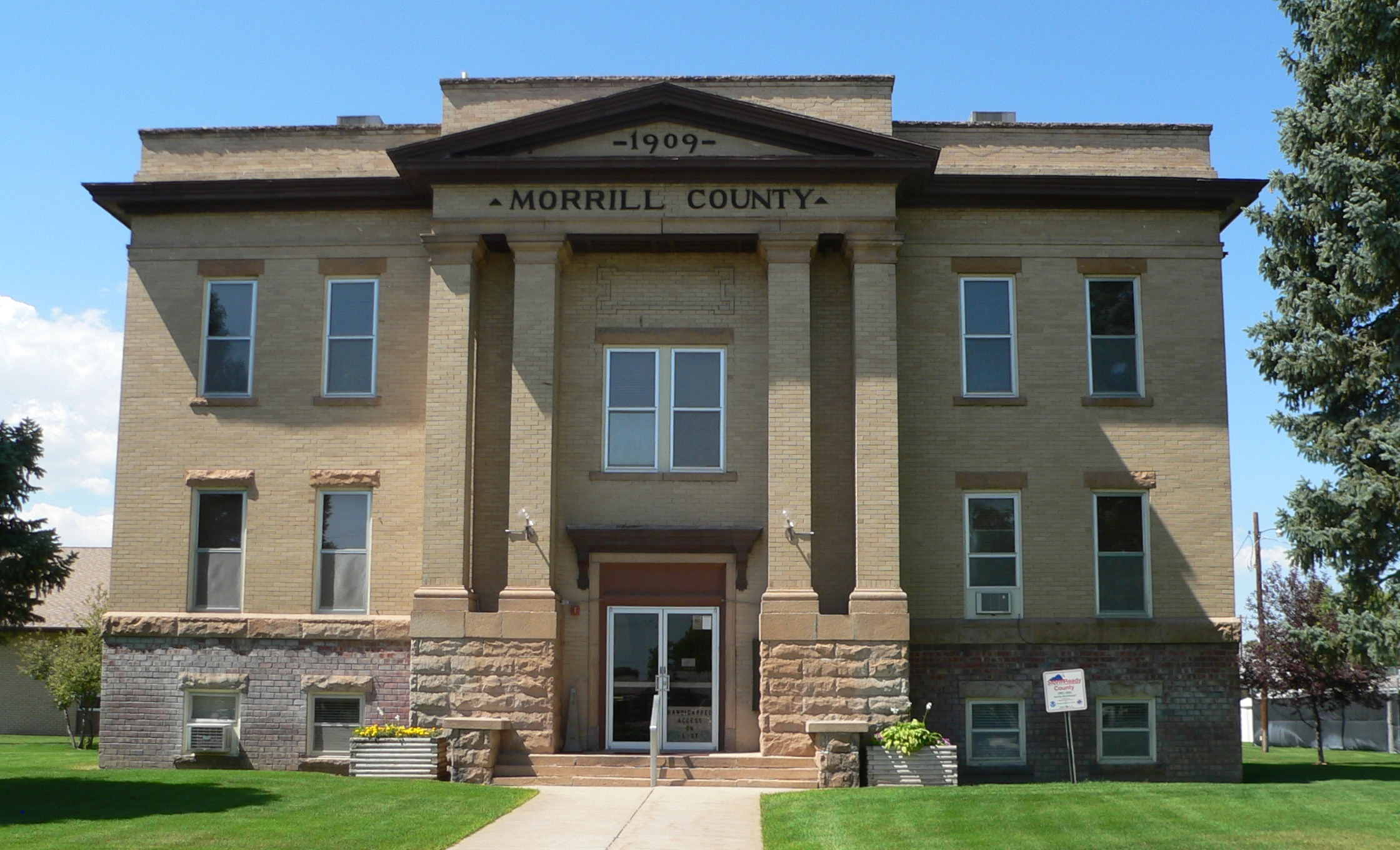
The Morrill County Courthouse in Bridgeport, Nebraska, completed in 1910.

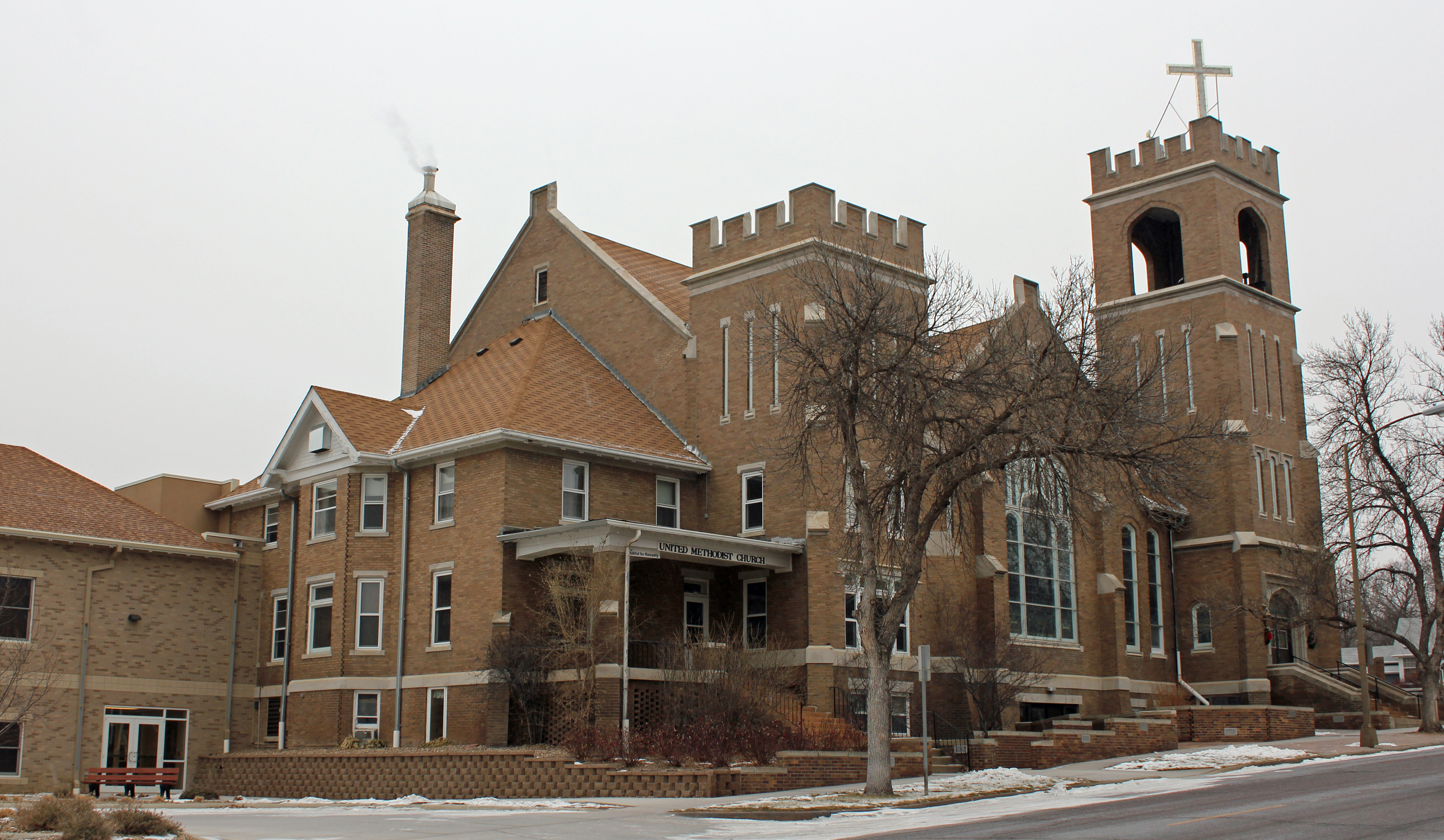
The First United Methodist Church in Pierre, South Dakota, completed in 1910.

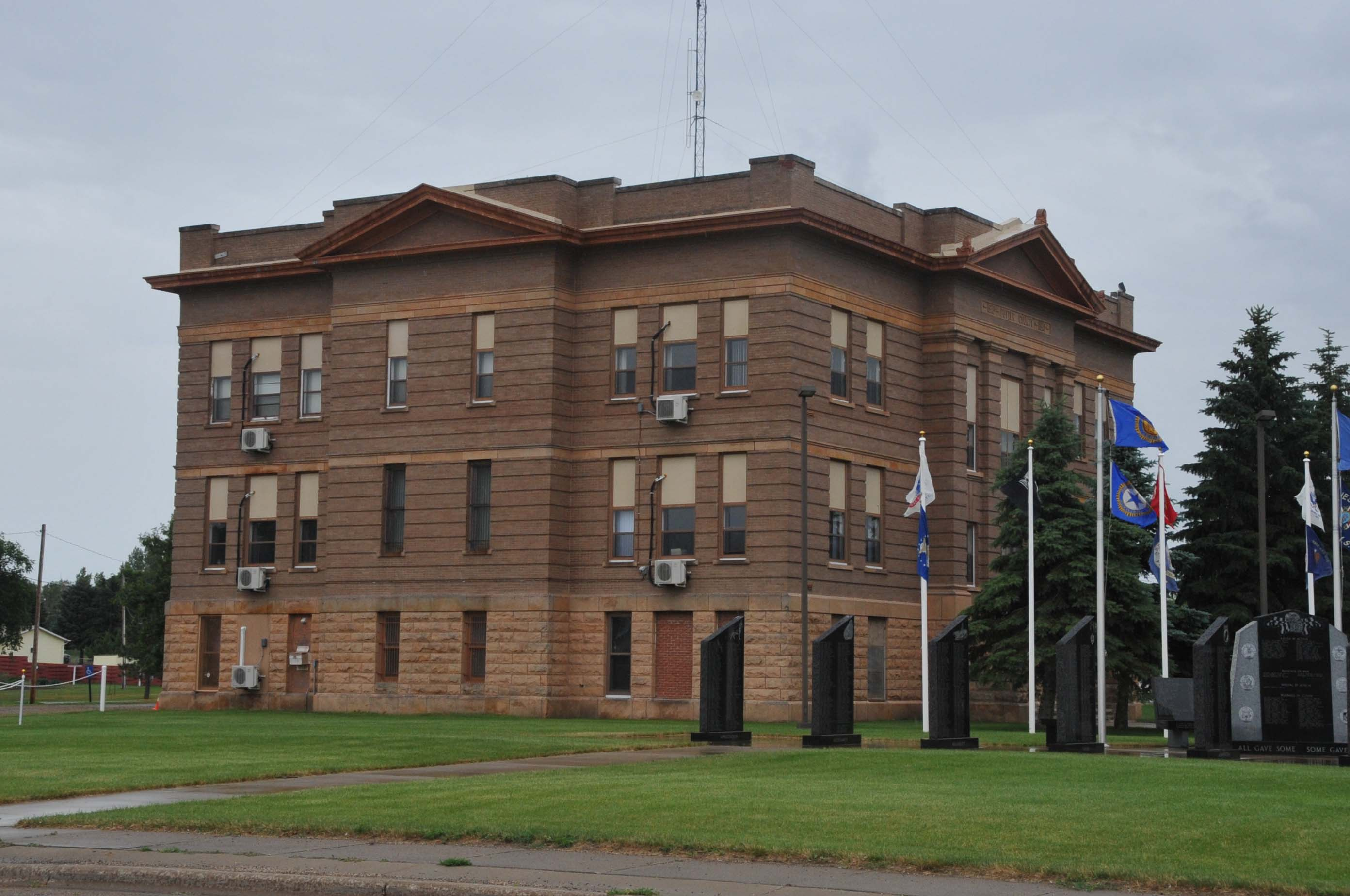
The Potter County Courthouse in Gettysburg, South Dakota, completed in 1911.

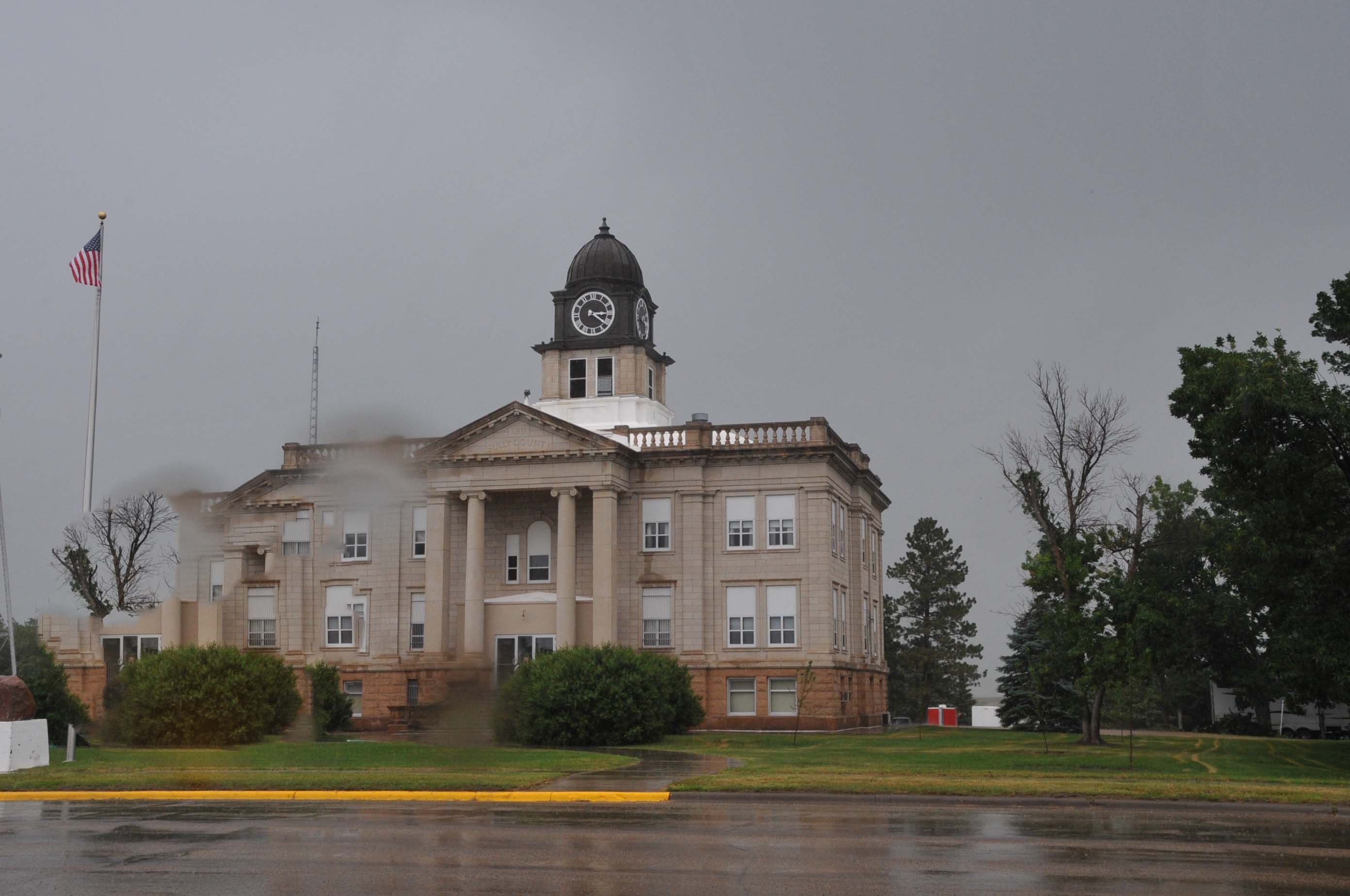
The Sully County Courthouse in Onida, South Dakota, completed in 1912.

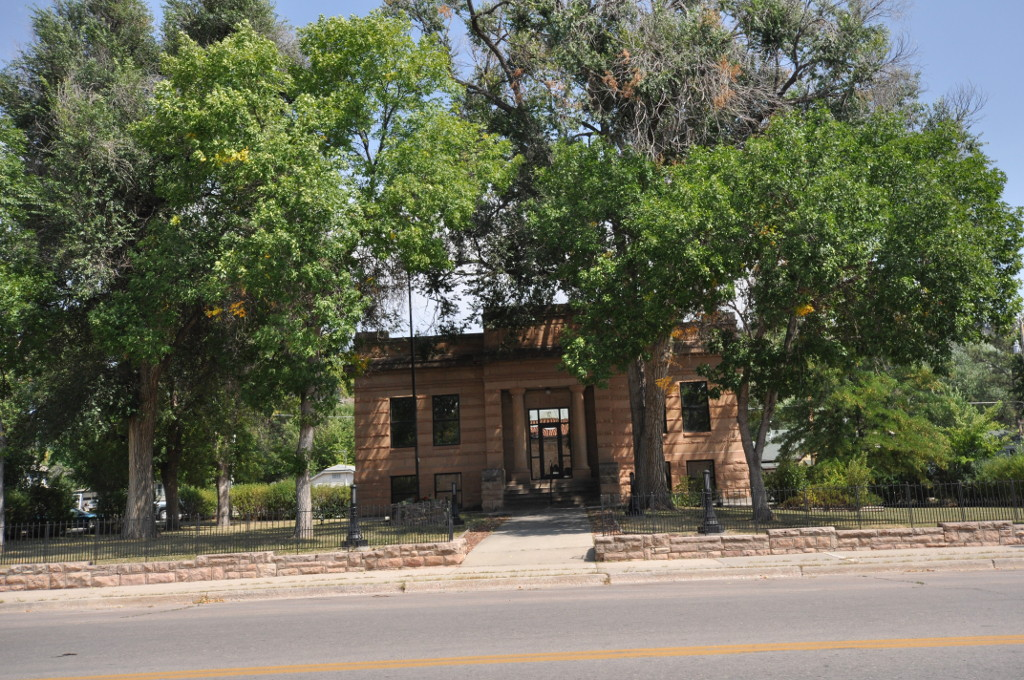
The former Hot Springs Public Library, completed in 1914.

John P. Eisentraut (1870-1958) was an American architect most closely associated with South Dakota. Eisentraut designed a number of buildings, including Carnegie libraries and courthouses, several of which are listed on the National Register of Historic Places. He was one of South Dakota's leading architects during the first quarter of the twentieth century.

== Life and career ==
John Philip Eisentraut was born April 12, 1870, in Maquoketa, Iowa to Philip Eisentraut and Mary Ann (Stump) Eisentraut. He was raised in Woodbury County near Sioux City and was educated in the public schools. He attended Morningside University and Northwestern University, graduating from the latter in 1894, and from 1891 to 1892 worked for Sioux City architect Charles P. Brown. He worked as an architect in Boone and Des Moines until 1898, when he formed the Iowa Architectural Company in Des Moines with architect Charles C. Cross. In 1902 this firm was dissolved, and Eisentraut returned to Sioux City to open his own office. In 1905 Eisentraut incorporated his firm as the Eisentraut-Colby-Pottenger Company with long-time employees F. E. Colby and H. G. Pottenger. In 1907 the firm opened a second office in Kansas City under the management of Eisentraut. Colby and Pottenger left the firm in December, which was reorganized as the Eisentraut Company with its office at Kansas City.

In 1909 Eisentraut moved to Deadwood, South Dakota, where he reorganized his firm as the Black Hills Company with W. O. Roselius and W. M. Rich. In Deadwood he expanded his practice to include engineering and construction services. In 1911 he and Rich moved to Hot Springs, where they reorganized the firm as the Fall River Company. In 1912 he temporarily retired from active practice and devoted his time to quarry management for three years. In early 1915 he resumed practice, opening an office in Rapid City. That year he was briefly in partnership with P. H. Bartholz as Eisentraut & Bartholz. In 1919 he moved to Custer, where he worked as an architect until his second retirement in 1928. He then worked as a storekeeper and postmaster in Blue Bell until 1936, when he resumed practice in Custer. He retired for the third and final time in 1945.

== Personal life ==
Eisentraut was married twice, first to Susie Kniffen of Independence in 1894 and second to Nora Alice Krum of Denver in 1907. He had two children with his first wife. Eisentraut died May 1, 1958, in Hill City, South Dakota.

== Legacy ==
In 1903 Eisentraut hired Nelle Peters as a drafter. She moved to the Kansas City office in 1907. She worked for Eisentraut until he moved to South Dakota in 1909, when she opened her own office in Kansas City. She was one of the earliest woman architects to work in the region.

The NRHP nomination for the Walworth County Courthouse reports that "John Philip Eisentraut was an Iowa native, who practiced architecture in South Dakota between 1909 and 1928. One of the state's most noted architects of the period, he prepared designs for a variety of major projects in South Dakota and the surrounding states. Among his other South Dakota commissions were the Potter County Courthouse and several commercial buildings in Hot Springs and Rapid city, and the Blue Bell Lodge in Custer State Park. Eisentraut worked under partnerships and business entities throughout his career. By the time the Potter county project was finished, Eisentraut was affiliated with 'The Fall River Company', an architectural firm in Hot Springs."

== Architectural works ==
=== Eisentraut-Colby-Pottenger Company, 1905-1907 ===
- Rawlins County Courthouse, 607 Main St, Atwood, Kansas (1906–07)
- Albion Carnegie Library, 437 S third St, Albion, Nebraska (1907–08, NRHP 2019)
- Pawnee City Carnegie Library, 730 G St, Pawnee City, Nebraska (1907–08, NRHP 2010)

=== Eisentraut Company, 1907-1909 ===
- Morrill County Courthouse, 606 L St, Bridgeport, Nebraska (1909–10, NRHP 1990)
- Woodbine Normal and Grade School, 501 Weare St, Woodbine, Iowa (1909–10, NRHP 2002, demolished)
- Woodbine Public Library, 58 fifth St, Woodbine, Iowa (1909–10, NRHP 1997)

=== Black Hills Company, 1909-1911 ===
- Church of the Immaculate Conception, 918 fifth St, Rapid City, South Dakota (1909–11, NRHP 1975)
- First United Methodist Church, 117 Central Ave, Pierre, South Dakota (1910, NRHP 1997)
- Logan County High School, 777 N fourth St, Sterling, Colorado (1910, demolished)
- Potter County Courthouse, 201 S Exene St, Gettysburg, South Dakota (1910–11, NRHP 1996)
- St. Anthony's Roman Catholic Church, 329 S third St, Sterling, Colorado (1910–11, NRHP 1982)
- Hyde County Courthouse, 412 Commercial Ave SE, Highmore, South Dakota (1911, NRHP 1978)
- L. E. Snyder house, 300 S sixth St, Onida, South Dakota (1911, NRHP 1993)
- Sully County Courthouse, 700 Ash Ave, Onida, South Dakota (1911–12, NRHP 2001)

=== Fall River Company, 1911-1912 ===
- Cheyenne County Courthouse, 1000 Tenth Ave, Sidney, Nebraska (1911, demolished)
- Christ Methodist Episcopal Church, 104 S fourth St, Sterling, Colorado (1911, demolished)
- Elks Theatre, 512 sixth St, Rapid City, South Dakota (1911)
- Pierce Public Library, 200 E Willow St, Pierce, Nebraska (1911)
- Walworth County Courthouse, 4304 Fourth Ave, Selby, South Dakota (1911–13, NRHP 1999)

=== John P. Eisentraut, after 1912 ===
- Hot Springs Public Library (former), 145 S Chicago St, Hot Springs, South Dakota (1913–14)
- Custer County Courthouse additions, 411 Mount Rushmore Rd, Custer, South Dakota (1915, NRHP 1972)
- Blue Bell Lodge, Custer State Park, Custer, South Dakota (1928)
