= National Register of Historic Places listings in Sully County, South Dakota =

Location of Sully County in South Dakota

This is a list of the National Register of Historic Places listings in Sully County, South Dakota.

This is intended to be a complete list of the properties on the National Register of Historic Places in Sully County, South Dakota, United States. The locations of National Register properties for which the latitude and longitude coordinates are included below, may be seen in a map.

There are 4 properties listed on the National Register in the county.

This National Park Service list is complete through NPS recent listings posted March 14, 2025.

== Current listings ==
	Name on the Register	Image	Date listed	Location	City or town	Description
1	Cooper Village Archeological Site	Cooper Village Archeological Site	June 2, 2003 (#03000504)	Address restricted	Onida	
2	Jacob D. Goosen Barn		February 3, 1993 (#92001853)	Roughly 0.6 miles east of Onida; 44°42′34″N 100°01′22″W	Onida	
3	L.E. Snyder House	L.E. Snyder House	August 5, 1993 (#93000784)	Junction of Cedar and 6th Streets; 44°42′19″N 100°03′54″W	Onida	
4	Sully County Courthouse	Sully County Courthouse	April 25, 2001 (#01000414)	Main and Ash Streets; 44°42′21″N 100°03′56″W	Onida	

== See also ==
- List of National Historic Landmarks in South Dakota
- National Register of Historic Places listings in South Dakota
