= National Register of Historic Places listings in Hyde County, South Dakota =

Location of Hyde County in South Dakota

This is a list of the National Register of Historic Places listings in Hyde County, South Dakota.

This is intended to be a complete list of the properties on the National Register of Historic Places in Hyde County, South Dakota, United States. The locations of National Register properties for which the latitude and longitude coordinates are included below, may be seen in a map.

There are 4 properties listed on the National Register in the county.

This National Park Service list is complete through NPS recent listings posted February 27, 2026.

== Current listings ==
	Name on the Register	Image	Date listed	Location	City or town	Description
1	Archeological Site No. 39HE331	Archeological Site No. 39HE331	August 6, 1993 (#93000793)	Address restricted	Holabird	
2	Augustus and Augusta Gerhart House		September 4, 1997 (#97001106)	321 Iowa St. 44°31′03″N 99°26′30″W	Highmore	
3	Hyde County Courthouse	Hyde County Courthouse	March 30, 1978 (#78002558)	412 Commercial St., SE. 44°30′59″N 99°26′21″W	Highmore	
4	Hyde County Memorial Auditorium		August 24, 2018 (#100002809)	200 2nd St SW; 44°31′09″N 99°26′34″W	Highmore	

=== Former listings ===
	Name on the Register	Image	Date listed	Date removed	Location	City or town	Description
1	Old Hyde County Courthouse		April 19, 1978 (#78002559)	August 21, 1997	110 Commercial St., SE.	Highmore	

== See also ==
- List of National Historic Landmarks in South Dakota
- National Register of Historic Places listings in South Dakota
