= Augustus and Augusta Gerhart House =

Historic house in South Dakota, United States

- U.S. National Register of Historic Places
- Location within South Dakota Location within the United States
- Location: 321 Iowa St., Highmore, South Dakota
- Coordinates: 44°31′3″N 99°26′30″W
- Area: less than one acre
- Built: 1896; 130 years ago
- Architectural style: Late Victorian
- NRHP reference No.: 97001106
- Added to NRHP: September 4, 1997; 28 years ago

The Augustus and Augusta Gerhart House is a historic house at 321 Iowa Street in Highmore, South Dakota, United States. It is a two-story wood-frame structure, built in 1889 by Christina Grant. It was purchased in 1896 by Augustus "Gus" and Augusta Gerhart, who lived there until her death (1906) and his move to Pierre after remarrying (1919). Gus Gerhart was a leading citizen of Highmore and South Dakota, arriving in 1882, and starting its first business, a lumber yard, soon thereafter. The house originally featured a Folk Victorian front gable, and was enlarged by the Gerharts soon after their purchase to make a cross gable plan. The house was damaged by lightning in 1928, resulting in some alterations, including the construction of an enclosed porch on the east (Iowa Street) facade.

The house was listed on the National Register of Historic Places in 1997.

== See also ==
- National Register of Historic Places listings in Hyde County, South Dakota
