= Archeological Site No. 39HE331 =

- U.S. National Register of Historic Places
- Nearest city: Holabird, South Dakota
- Area: less than one acre
- MPS: Prehistoric Rock Art of South Dakota MPS
- NRHP reference No.: 93000793
- Added to NRHP: August 6, 1993

39HE331 is an archaeological rock art site in Hyde County, South Dakota. The art is located on a flat boulder in a field overlooking an intermittent stream near the community of Holabird. The art consists of pecked geometric shapes, including a series of "turkey track" designs, two circles with rays extending from one half, a horseshoe shape, and a plain circle. One of the turkey tracks has an X through it and is surrounded by a circle. The meaning of these symbols is not known, as they do not resemble other rock art in the region. Glacial striations in the boulder surface may also be confused for pecking.

The site was listed on the National Register of Historic Places in 1993, for its potential to yield information about prehistoric Native American movement patterns.

== See also ==
- National Register of Historic Places listings in Hyde County, South Dakota
