= Senator Woodruff =

Senator Woodruff may refer to:

- Christian B. Woodruff (1828–1871), New York State Senate
- Hubert W. Woodruff (1923–2019), Illinois State Senate
- Rollin S. Woodruff (1854–1925), Connecticut State Senate
