= Woodbine Normal and Grade School =

- U.S. National Register of Historic Places
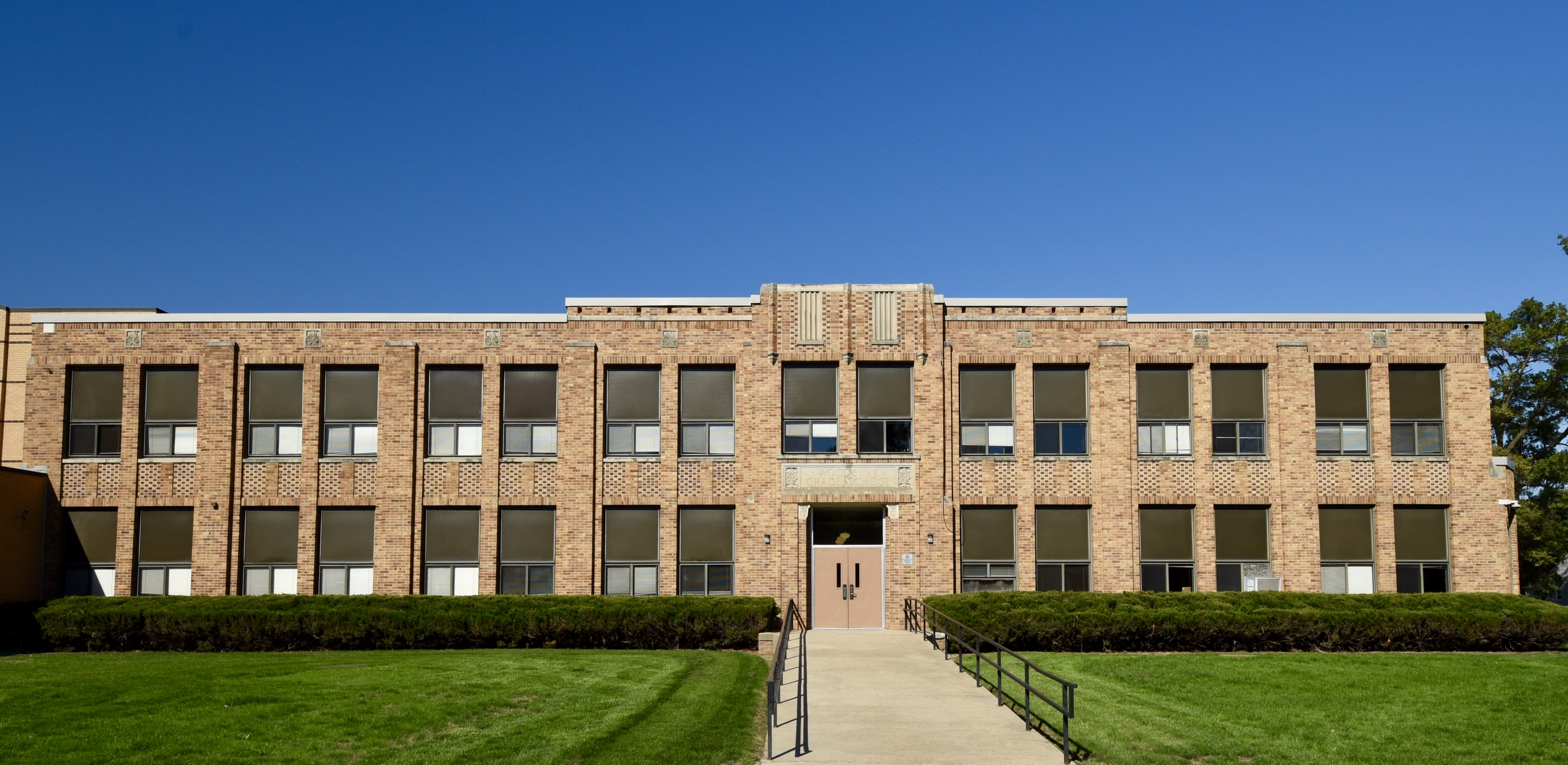

- Location within Iowa Location within the United States
- Location: 5th and Weare; Woodbine, Iowa
- Coordinates: 41°44′15″N 95°42′24″W
- Area: 1.6 acres (0.65 ha)
- Built: 1910, 1931
- Architect: John P. Eisentraut; Dougher, Rich and Woodburn
- Architectural style: Art Deco
- MPS: Public Schools for Iowa: Growth and Change MPS
- NRHP reference No.: 02001227
- Added to NRHP: November 18, 2002

Woodbine Normal and Grade School are historic buildings located in Woodbine, Iowa, United States. The buildings are part of a complex that provides space for kindergarten to senior high school grades. Two sections of the building were originally separate buildings that are a part of this historical designation.

Woodbine Normal and High School was built in 1910. It is a two-story brick structure built on a raised basement and capped by a hipped roof. It has a limestone belt course between the basement and the first floor, and simple corbel panels between the second and third floors. The main entrance located on the south facade is set within a 1½-story projecting pavilion. The building was designed by the Kansas City, Missouri, architect John P. Eisentraut. The grade school building is a two-story brick building. Built in 1931, it was designed in the Art Deco style by the Des Moines architectural firm Dougher, Rich and Woodburn. It has a large limestone tablet over the main entrance with decorative floral motifs and the inscription, "Woodbine Grade School". A two-story brick structure from 1992 connects the two buildings. It replaced the original single story connector from 1931. The buildings were listed on the National Register of Historic Places in 2002.

== Notable alumni ==
- Charles W. Pugsley (1878–1940), U.S. Assistant Secretary of Agriculture, president of South Dakota State College of Agriculture and Mechanic Arts
