= Potter County Courthouse =

Potter County Courthouse may refer to:

- Potter County Courthouse (Pennsylvania), Coudersport, Pennsylvania
- Potter County Courthouse (South Dakota), Gettysburg, South Dakota
- Potter County Courthouse (Texas), Amarillo, Texas
