= Cooper Village Archeological Site =

- U.S. National Register of Historic Places
- Nearest city: Onida, South Dakota
- Area: 23 acres (9.3 ha)
- NRHP reference No.: 03000504
- Added to NRHP: June 2, 2003

The Cooper Village Archeological Site, designated 39SL15, encompasses what is believed to be a prehistoric Native American village in Sully County, South Dakota. It is located on a peninsula projecting into Lake Oahe, and portions of it were identified in 1979 and 1982 as being subjected to shoreline erosion by the lake. It is described as a small village, with four depressions identified as being consistent with dwellings, and a low mound, with occupancy believed to c. 1550-1675 CE, based on artifacts found at the site.

The site was listed on the National Register of Historic Places in 2003.

== See also ==
- National Register of Historic Places listings in Sully County, South Dakota
