= Jacob D. Goosen Barn =

- U.S. National Register of Historic Places
- Location within South Dakota Location within the United States
- Nearest city: Onida, South Dakota
- Coordinates: 44°42′34″N 100°1′22″W
- Area: less than one acre
- Built: 1919
- Architectural style: Shawver type truss barn
- NRHP reference No.: 92001853
- Added to NRHP: February 3, 1993

The Jacob D. Goosen Barn is a historic barn in rural Sully County, South Dakota about 1/2 mile east of Onida on the north side of East Onida Road. Built in 1904, it was built with a Shawver truss roof, a form popular in other areas, but not widely adopted in South Dakota. This truss method used lighter-weight framing, which transferred the roof's dead load to the walls, enabling the removal of interior posts. The barn is 50 feet (15 m) wide and 100 feet (30 m) long, with a high gambrel roof that characterizes the use of the Shawver truss.

The barn was listed on the National Register of Historic Places in 1993.

== See also ==
- National Register of Historic Places listings in Sully County, South Dakota
