= Hyde County Courthouse (South Dakota) =

- U.S. National Register of Historic Places
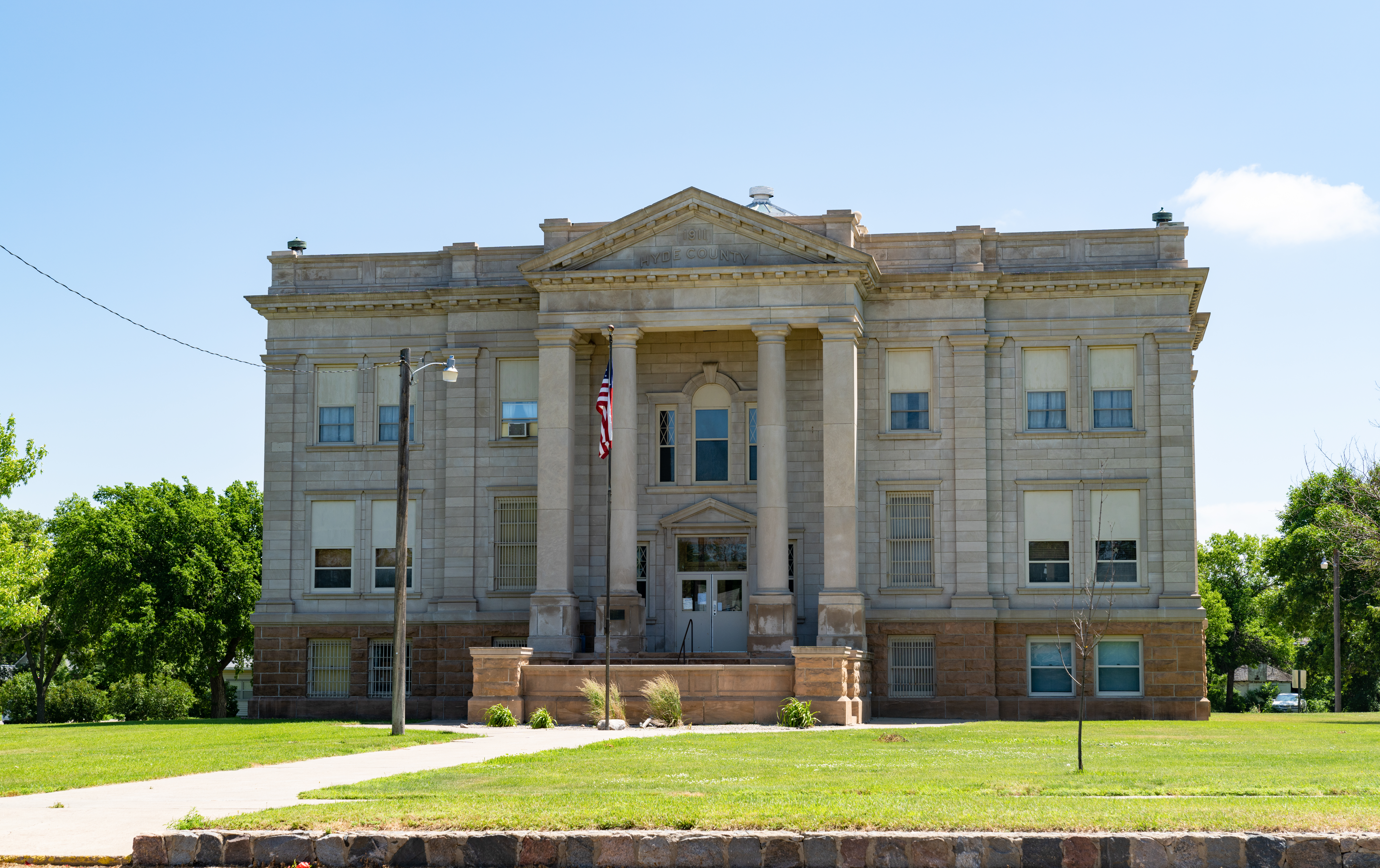
- Hyde County Courthouse in 2022

- Location within South Dakota Location within the United States
- Interactive map showing the location of Hyde County Courthouse
- Location: 412 Commercial St., SE; Highmore, South Dakota
- Coordinates: 44°30′59″N 99°26′21″W
- Area: 2 acres (0.81 ha)
- Built: 1911
- Built by: Gray Construction Co.
- Architect: The Black Hill Co.
- Architectural style: Classical Revival
- NRHP reference No.: 78002558
- Added to NRHP: March 30, 1978

The Hyde County Courthouse is located at 412 Commercial Street SE in Highmore, the county seat of Hyde County, South Dakota. It is a rectangular masonry structure, two stories in height, set on a high basement. The foundation is sandstone, while the main walls are Indiana limestone. The center portion of the front and rear facades project slightly, framed by pilasters. The front facade has a portico supported by four columns, two square and two unfluted Doric round columns. The building was designed by the Black Hills Company of Deadwood and built in 1911. It has served since then as the county courthouse, and is the county's most prominent example of Classical Revival architecture.

The building was listed on the National Register of Historic Places in 1978.

== See also ==
- National Register of Historic Places listings in Hyde County, South Dakota
