= Methodist Episcopal Church (Pierre, South Dakota) =

Historic church in South Dakota, United States

- U.S. National Register of Historic Places
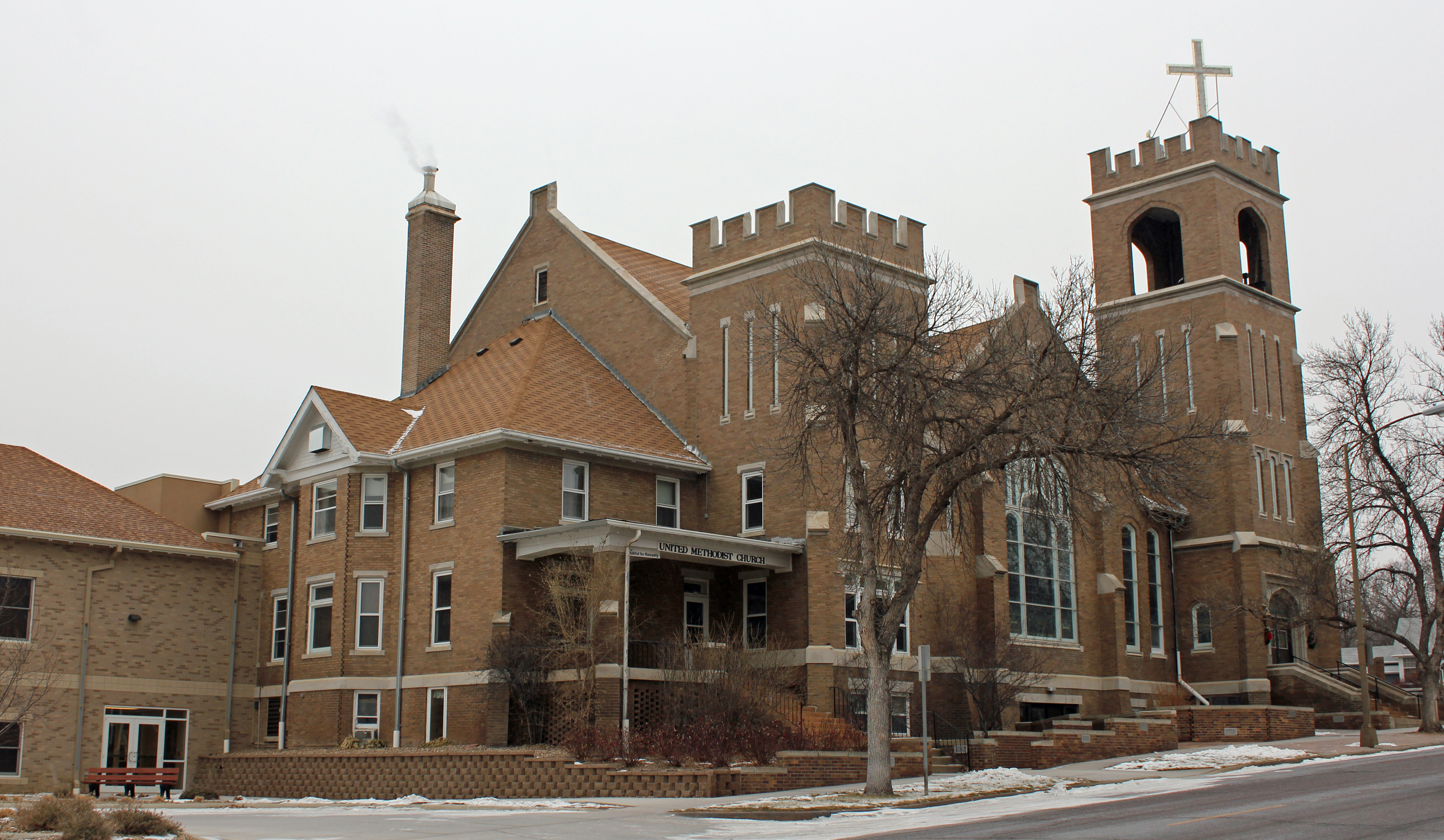
- The church as viewed from Central Avenue North.

- Location within South Dakota Location within the United States
- Location: 117 Central Ave., N. Pierre, South Dakota
- Coordinates: 44°22′16″N 100°21′12″W
- Built: 1910
- Built by: F. Turner
- Architect: Black Hills Company
- Architectural style: Late Gothic Revival
- NRHP reference No.: 97000428
- Added to NRHP: May 11, 1997

The Methodist Episcopal Church built in 1910 is an historic Methodist church located at 117 Central Avenue, North in Pierre, South Dakota. The original congregation, which dates from 1880, moved in 1881 from rented halls to its first building on Fort Street. In 1883 it moved to a building on the present Central Avenue site. The present Late Gothic Revival-style building was built in 1910. It was designed by John P. Eisentraut of the Black Hills Company, architects of Deadwood, and built by parishioner F. Turner. It "included space for the first library in Pierre, a gymnasium, and a plunge pool." On May 9, 1997, the 1910 building was added to the National Register of Historic Places. It is now the Pierre First United Methodist Church. In February 2012, Reverend Dan Bader was announced as the new Senior Pastor.
