= Albion Carnegie Library =

Public library

- U.S. National Register of Historic Places
- Location within Nebraska Location within the United States
- Location: 437 S. 3rd St., Albion, Nebraska
- Coordinates: 41°41′21″N 97°59′59″W
- Built: 1908
- Architect: Eisentraut-Colby-Pottenger Company
- MPS: Carnegie Libraries in Nebraska MPS AD
- NRHP reference No.: 100003569
- Added to NRHP: March 25, 2019

The Albion Carnegie Library, at 437 S. 3rd St. in Albion, Nebraska, is a Carnegie library built in 1908 which was listed on the National Register of Historic Places in 2019.

It was one of 69 libraries in Nebraska built from Andrew Carnegie funding, and was still serving as Albion's public library in 2019. It was designed by architects the Eisentraut-Colby-Pottenger Company.
