= Charles W. Pugsley =

American educator and government official (1878–1940)

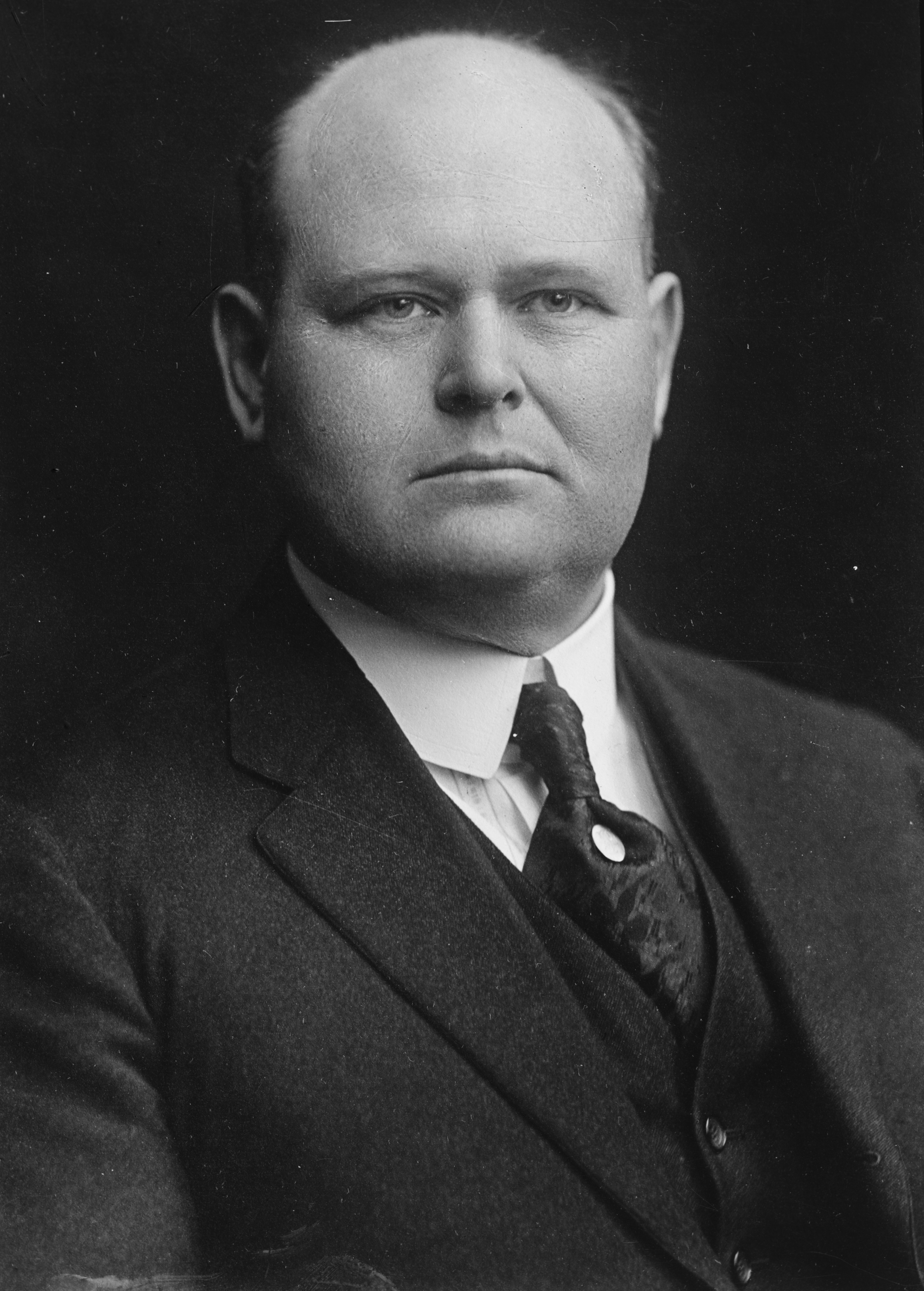
- Portrait of Pugsley, c. 1900

Assistant Secretary of Agriculture
- In office October 1, 1921 – September 14, 1923
- President: Warren G. Harding; Calvin Coolidge
- Preceded by: Elmer Darwin Ball
- Succeeded by: Howard Mason Gore

Personal details
- Born: Charles William Pugsley; August 12, 1878 Woodbine, Iowa, U.S.
- Died: December 17, 1940 (aged 62) Omaha, Nebraska, U.S.
- Resting place: Woodbine Cemetery
- Spouse: Lillian Florence Gibson (m. 1906)
- Children: 1
- Education: University of Nebraska (BS)
- Occupation: Educator; farmer; government official; newspaper editor

Charles William Pugsley (August 12, 1878 – December 17, 1940) was an American educator and government official. He was professor at the University of Nebraska from 1908 to 1918. He served as Assistant Secretary of Agriculture from 1921 to 1923. He was president of South Dakota State College of Agriculture and Mechanic Arts from 1923 to 1940.

== Early life ==
Charles William Pugsley was born on August 12, 1878, in Woodbine, Iowa, to Ida Alice (née Kennedy) and George Pugsley. His father was a farmer in Harrison County. He attended a district school for three years near his home. At the age of 12, he entered grade school. He was class president of Woodbine Normal and Grade School and graduated in 1898. He filled a vacancy at the commercial school of Woodbine Normal School for two months. He studied at Cedar Rapids Business School from 1898 to 1899. He was elected head of the commercial school of Woodbine Normal School in September 1899 and served in the role for three years. During the summers, he worked as assistant cashier of Moorhead State Bank. He graduated with a Bachelor of Science in agriculture from the University of Nebraska in 1906. In college he was an assistant in the botany department of Charles Edwin Bessey and the soil and grain laboratories of Thomas Lyttleton Lyon. While attending college, he was superintendent of Lincoln's YMCA night school for two years and lectured across Nebraska.

== Career ==
Following graduation, Pugsley was offered the role of assistant in Lyon's department and a role in management at the Farmer's Institute of Nebraska, but declined and moved back to Woodbine in March 1906. He ran his father's farm under shares from his father until he purchased it in March 1907. Following illness of him and his wife, he took up the position of associate professor of animal husbandry at the University of Nebraska in the fall of 1908. He was superintendent of the National Corn Exposition in 1908 and led the university's exhibit. He was also in charge of livestock at the university's experiment station. In June 1909, he was made head of the agronomy and farm management department. He was professor of farm management from 1911 to 1914. Following the abolishing of the Farmer's Institute department, he became head of the department of agricultural extension, serving from July 1911 to 1918. He was associated with boys' and girls' work from 1912 to 1918. In 1913, he was a delegate to the International Institute of Agriculture in Rome. He was editor of the Nebraska Farmer, a weekly agricultural newspaper of Lincoln from 1918 to 1922. He continued running his 170 acres (69 ha) farm in Woodbine with a partner and converted it into a dairy farm.

Puglsey was a member of the Nebraska Constitutional Convention from 1919 to 1920 and served on the Nebraska Board of Agriculture from 1918 to 1921. From October 1, 1921, to September 14, 1923, Pugsley served as the Assistant Secretary of Agriculture under President Warren G. Harding and Secretary Henry Cantwell Wallace. He was appointed by President Franklin D. Roosevelt as consultant to the U.S. regional agricultural planning board and served on the board for five years. He became president of South Dakota State College of Agriculture and Mechanic Arts on September 15, 1923. He resigned on July 1, 1940, due to bad health. During his tenure, the college was divided into agricultural, general science, home economics, engineering and pharmacy areas of study. It was also divided into eight departments. Seven buildings were built during his time as president. He was president of the South Dakota Educational Association from 1934 to 1935.

== Personal life ==
Pugsley married Lillian Florence Gibson, of Blair, Nebraska, and later Woodbine, on February 22, 1906. They had a son Albert L. His son Albert was an architect and educator associated with Kansas State University. Pugsley lived in Brookings, South Dakota.

Pugsley died on December 17, 1940, at a hospital in Omaha. He was buried in Woodbine Cemetery.

== Awards and honors ==
Pugsley received an honorary doctor of agriculture from the University of Nebraska in June 1922.

The student union at South Dakota State University built in 1940 was named after him. It was later renamed the Pugsley Continuing Education Center.
