= Pawnee City Carnegie Library =

- U.S. National Register of Historic Places
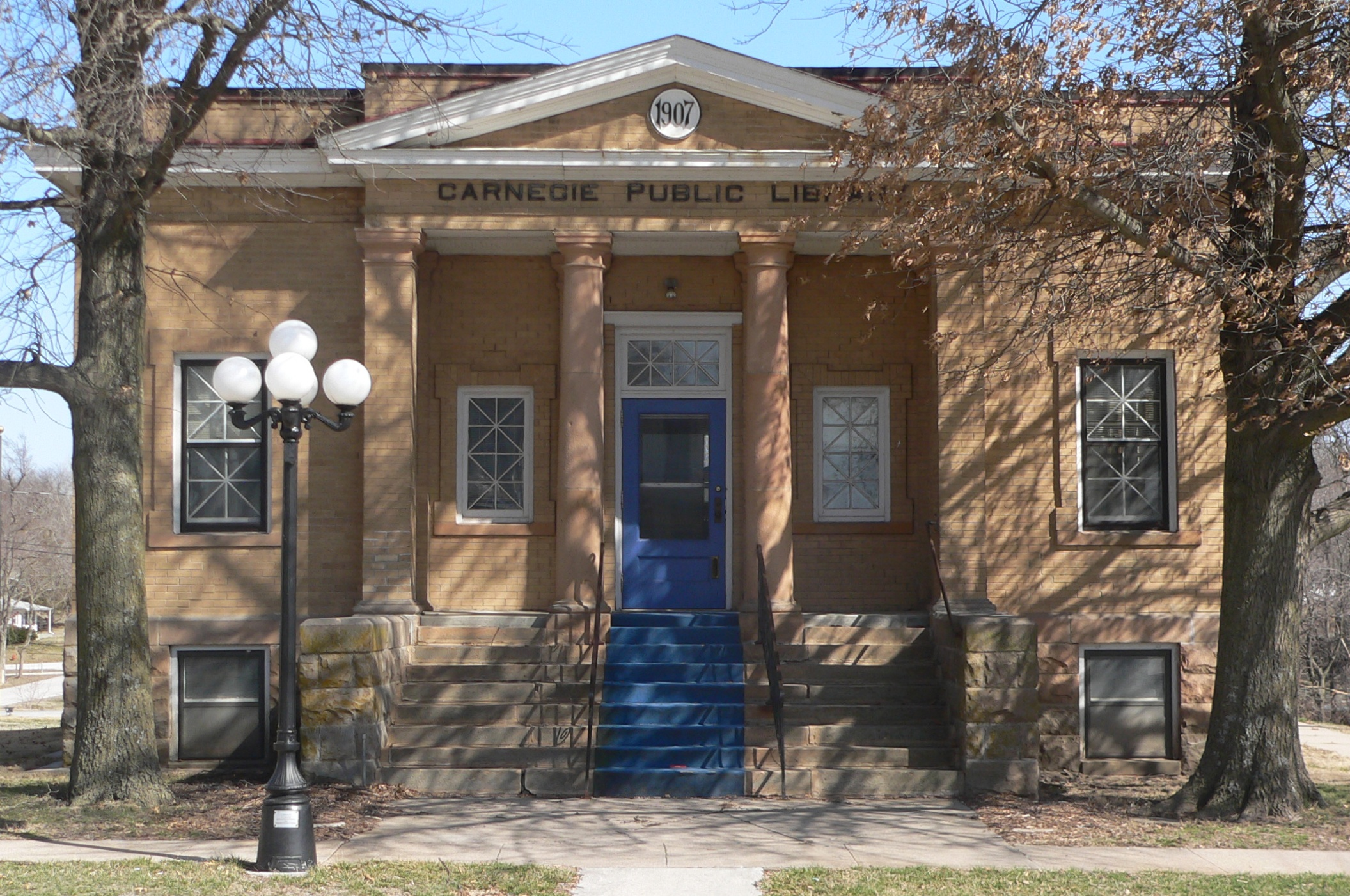
- The library in 2012

- Location within Nebraska Location within the United States
- Location: 730 G St, Pawnee City, Nebraska
- Coordinates: 40°06′36″N 96°09′10″W
- Area: 0.4 acres (0.16 ha)
- Built: 1908
- Architect: Eisentraut-Colby-Pottenger Company
- Architectural style: Classical Revival
- MPS: Carnegie Libraries in Nebraska MPS
- NRHP reference No.: 10001004
- Added to NRHP: December 10, 2010

The Pawnee City Carnegie Library is a historic building in Pawnee City, Nebraska, and a Carnegie library. Its erection was initially rejected by the voters of Pawnee City in 1905, despite the promise of a $7,000 donation from Andrew Carnegie. It was built in 1908, and designed in the Classical Revival architectural style. It has been listed on the National Register of Historic Places since December 10, 2010.

It was designed by the Eisentraut-Colby-Pottenger Company of Sioux City, Iowa. It is nearly square, being 37 by 40 feet (11 m × 12 m) in plan, and has brick exterior walls with a yellow brick veneer laid in running bond on three sides.
