= Hyde County Memorial Auditorium =

- U.S. National Register of Historic Places
- Location within South Dakota Location within the United States
- Location: 200 2nd St., SW, Highmore, South Dakota
- Coordinates: 44°31′09″N 99°26′34″W
- Built: 1951
- Built by: Frank Hawkins
- Architect: Ursa L. Freed
- NRHP reference No.: 100002809
- Added to NRHP: August 24, 2018

The Hyde County Memorial Auditorium in Highmore, South Dakota was built in 1951. It was listed on the National Register of Historic Places in 2018.

A community effort to build the auditorium began in 1945, and a fundraising campaign soon raised $25,000. A bond issue was found to be unnecessary, and bond proceeds were returned.

It was designed by architect Ursa L. Freed in a transitional style between Art Deco architecture and Art Moderne architecture.

The building hosted basketball games, concerts, theater, and other community events. The building also hosts some municipal offices. A memorial plaque in the lobby lists local men and women who served in any war from the American Civil War on.

Its opening featured Yogi Yorgesson and the "Scandahoovians", his seven-piece band.
