= Rawlins County Courthouse =

Coordinates: 39°48′29″N 101°02′23″W

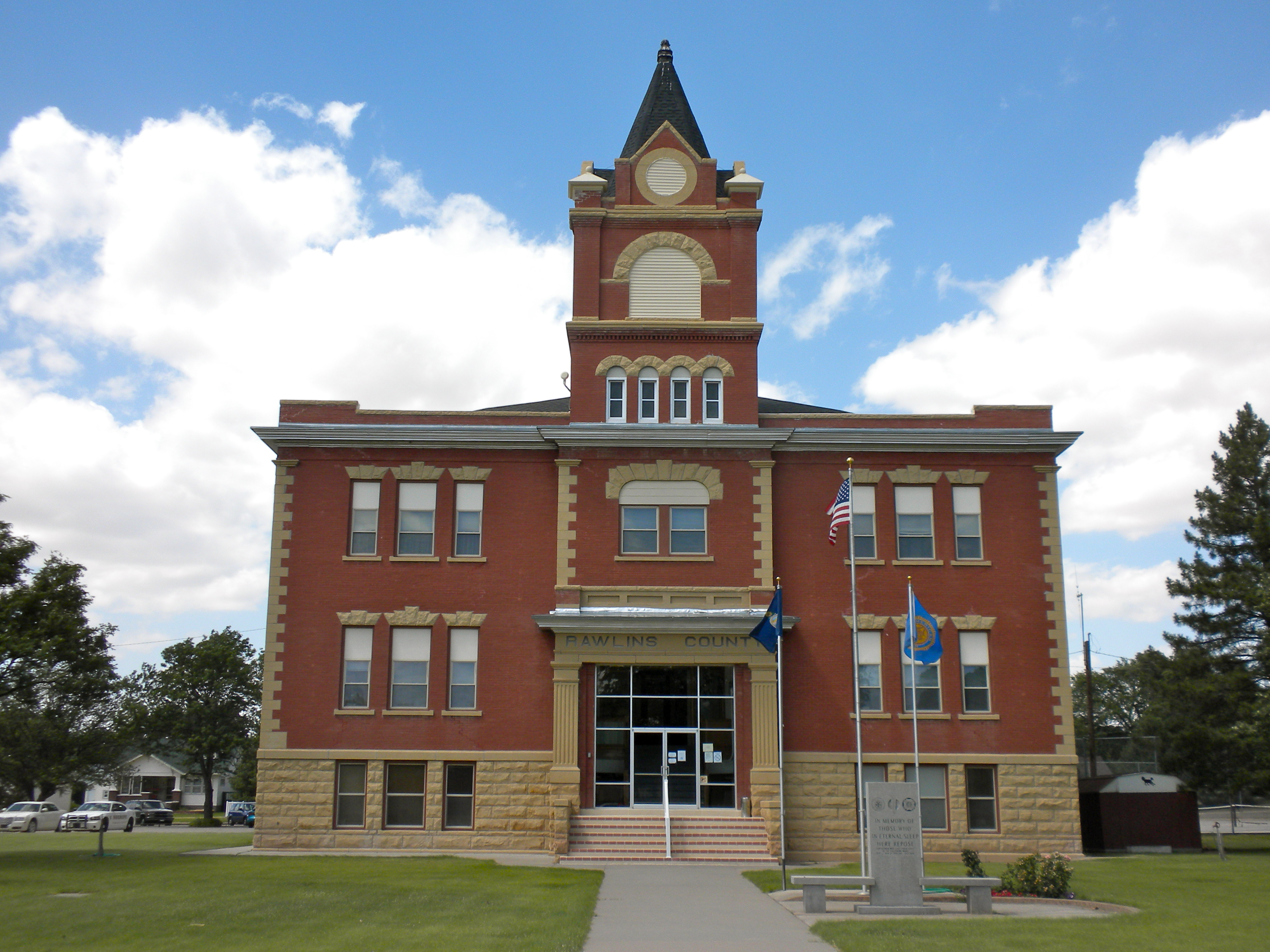
- Rawlins County Courthouse in 2010
- Established: 1873
- Location: 607 Main Street, Atwood, Kansas
- Website: https://www.rawlinscounty.org/clerk_of_the_district_court/index.php

Magistrate Judge
- Currently: James Schroeder

The Rawlins County Courthouse is a courthouse in Atwood, Kansas, serving Rawlins County, which is in the 15th judicial district of Kansas. It was designed by the Eisentraut-Colby-Pottenger Company, architects from Sioux City, Iowa.
