= St. Anthony's Roman Catholic Church (Sterling, Colorado) =

Historic church in Colorado, United States

- U.S. National Register of Historic Places
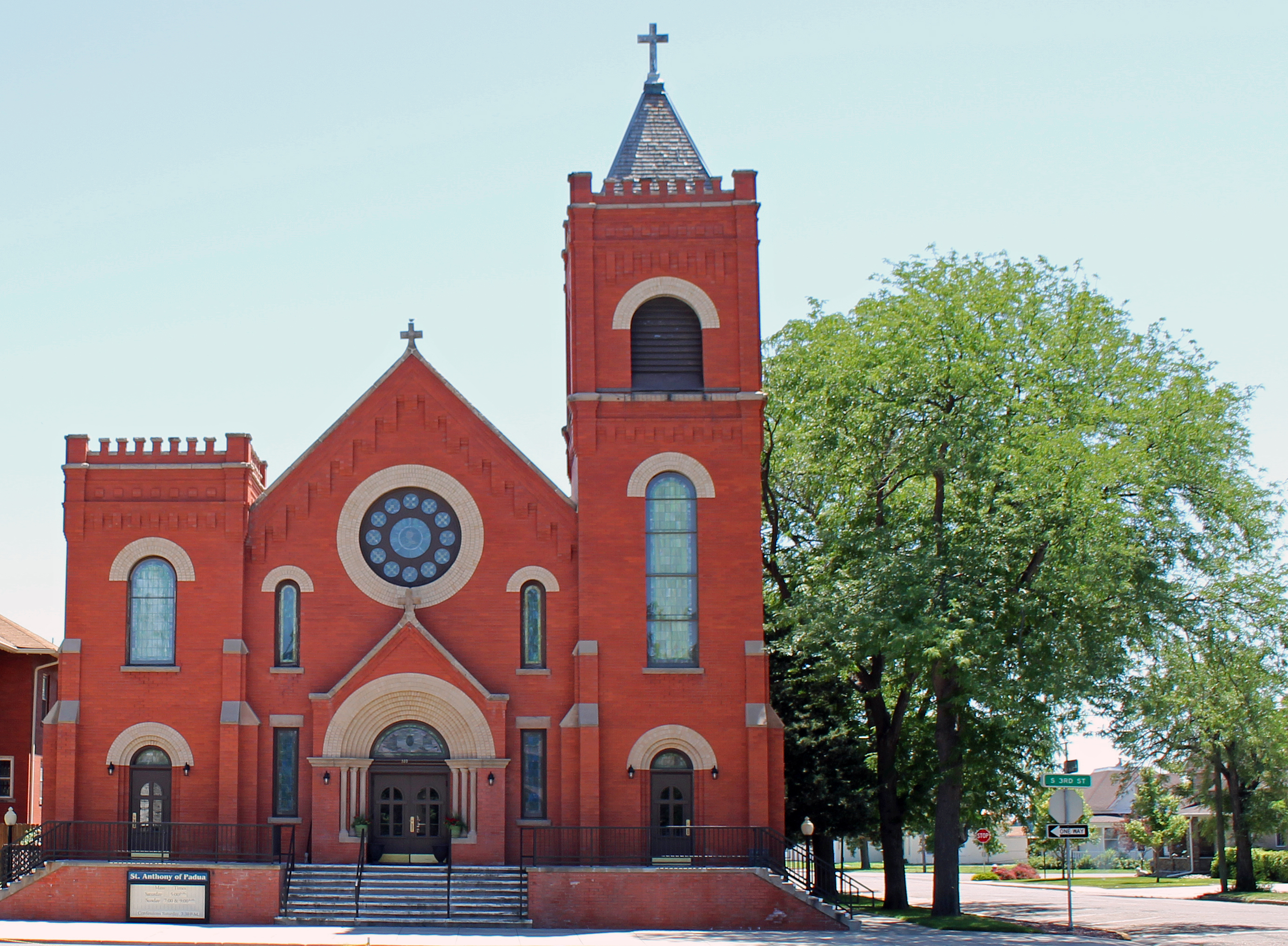

- Location within Colorado Location within the United States
- Location: 329 S. 3rd St., Sterling, Colorado
- Coordinates: 40°37′14″N 103°12′36″W
- Area: less than one acre
- Built: 1911
- Architect: John P. Eisentraut
- Architectural style: Romanesque
- NRHP reference No.: 82002306
- Added to NRHP: June 3, 1982

St. Anthony's Roman Catholic Church is a historic church at 329 S. 3rd Street in Sterling, Colorado, United States. It was built in 1911 and was added to the National Register of Historic Places in 1982.

The building was designed in 1910 by John P. Eisentraut's Black Hills Company, an architectural firm of Deadwood, South Dakota.

== History ==
=== Background ===
The current structure is the third building dedicated to be St. Anthony's Catholic Church. The first building was designed by the establishing priest, Father Howlett. In 1888 it was dedicated as a mission church ana named St. John the Baptist Church. It was located on Walnut Street in Sterling, Colorado. This building was only active for 11 years when a tornado swept away the structure in 1896. The second building was purchased by the parish in 1902. The structure was already standing and converted to a church. It was located at North 5th and Chestnut Street. In 1908 St. John the Baptist Church was promoted, becoming an independent parish. The third, current building was built in 1911 and is located at 3rd Street and Cedar. It was renamed St. Anthony Catholic Church when dedicated after the local patron saint, Anthony Giacomini. It was designed by John P. Eisentraut's Black Hills Company. In 1914 a priest house was built to the left of the cathedral, and a school was added in 1918 across the street.

== Building ==
=== Architect ===
John Philip Eisentraut graduated with an architectural degree in 1894 at Northwestern University in Illinois. He started an architectural firm in Deadwood, South Dakota, designing buildings mainly in South Dakota and Nebraska.

=== Style ===
The church is of Romanesque Revival style. The church's dimensional plan is irregular, with uneven vertical form. Each tower has a different roof level, with the main part having high sloped roofs. Throughout, arches are dominant. The tympanum in the entryways and rounded windows play into the main style. The many stained glass windows are a key feature of catholic churches. The main façade is brick, with cream colored voussoirs highlighting the curved windows. The foundation of the building is stone.

=== National Register of Historic Places ===
St. Anthony's Church was added to the National Register of Historic Places on June 3, 1982, because of its architectural significance. Its period of significance was from 1900 to 1924. The buildings exterior has been preserved from that period. The private owner is the Roman Catholic Archdiocese of Denver.

== Bibliography ==
- National Register Database, 1982. Asset Detail Document for Application into Database.
  - This is a document that has all the application information for the building to be admitted to the National Database.
- Volga German Institute. Information beginning and local meaning of building.
  - Page is published by an educational institution and has background on the buildings history.
- St. Anthony Catholic Church, Parish Website.
- E Nebraska History. John Philip Eisentraut, Architect.
  - About architect.
- Sah Archipedia. St. Anthony's Catholic Church.
- History Colorado. Romanesque Revival.
