= Walworth County Courthouse =

- U.S. National Register of Historic Places
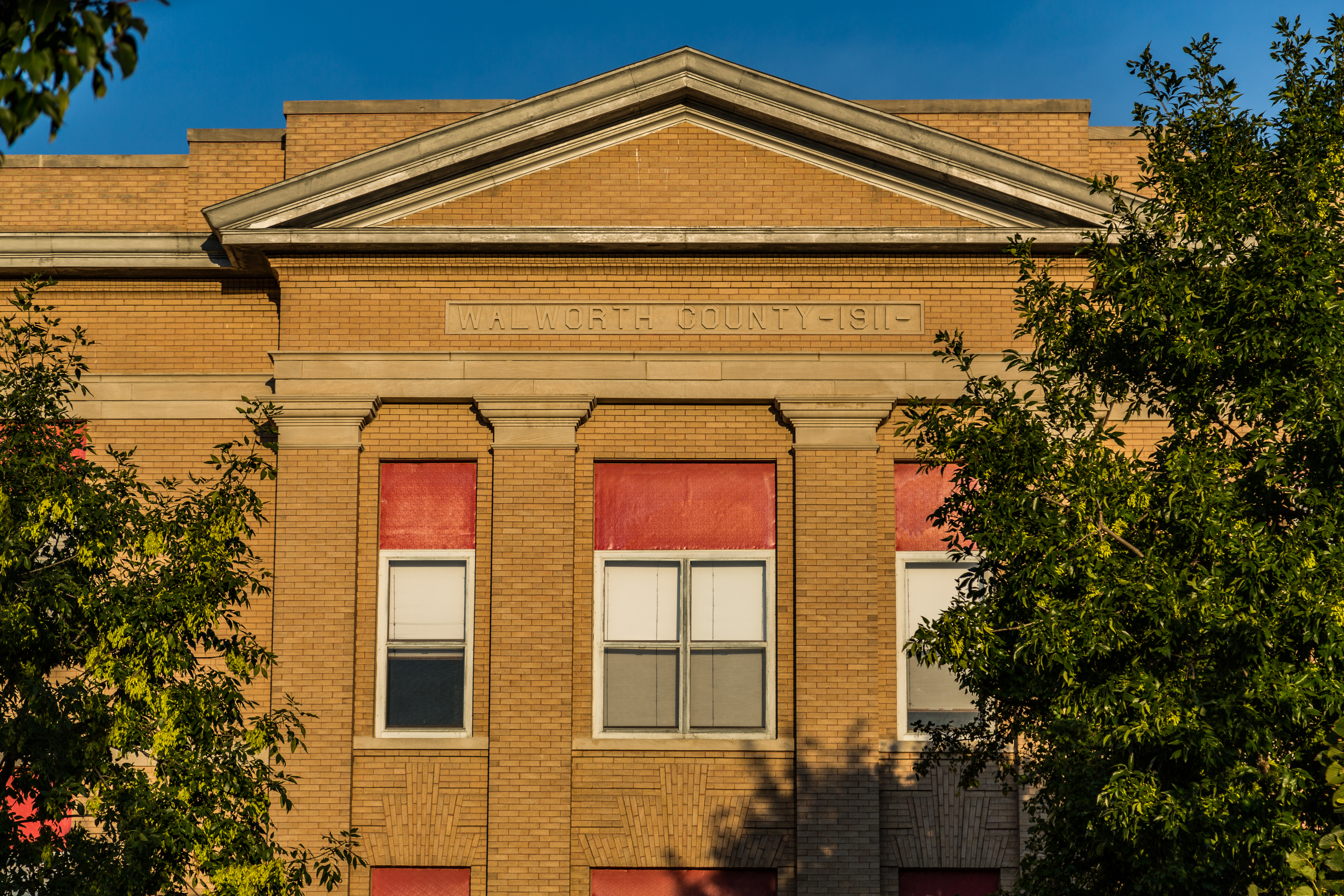

- Location within South Dakota Location within the United States
- Interactive map showing the location of Walworth County Courthouse
- Location: 4304 4th Ave., Selby, South Dakota
- Coordinates: 45°30′25″N 100°02′03″W
- Area: less than one acre
- Built: 1911
- Built by: Gary Construction
- Architect: Fall River Company
- Architectural style: Classical Revival, Romanesque
- MPS: County Courthouses of South Dakota MPS
- NRHP reference No.: 99000680
- Added to NRHP: June 3, 1999

The Walworth County Courthouse, located at 4304 4th Ave. in Selby, South Dakota, is a courthouse for Walworth County, South Dakota which was built in 1911. It was listed on the National Register of Historic Places in 1999.

It is a three-story structure built of brick, sandstone, and concrete. Its design is "utilitarian" yet includes Classical Revival details.

The building was designed by the Fall River Company, a Hot Springs-based architecture firm operated by architect John P. Eisentraut.

A jail building completed in 1911 is also included in the listing. Its design is Late Victorian Romanesque in style.
