= Sully County Courthouse =

- U.S. National Register of Historic Places
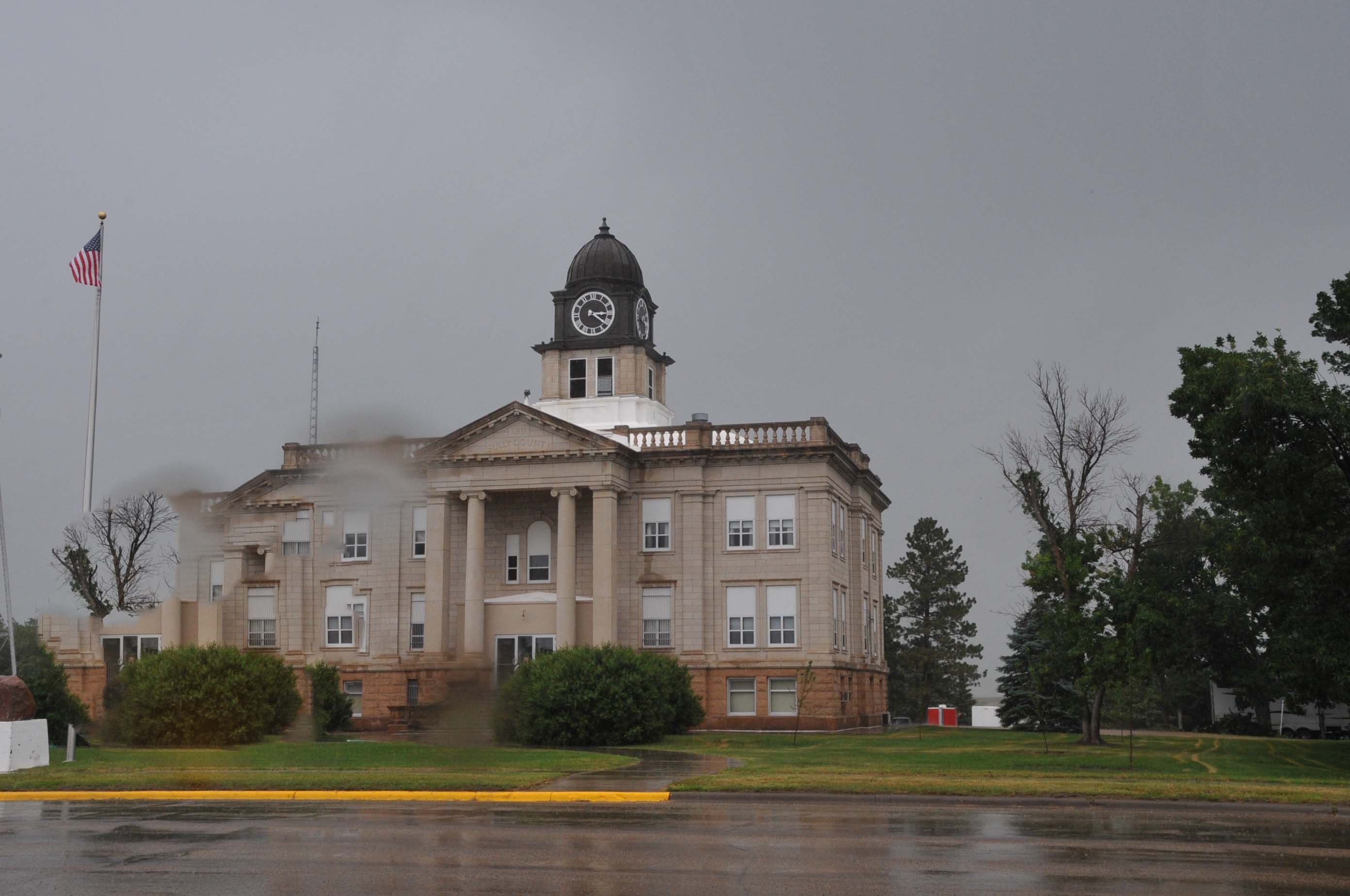

- Location within South Dakota Location within the United States
- Interactive map showing the location of Sully County Courthouse
- Location: Main and Ash Sts., Onida, South Dakota
- Coordinates: 44°42′21″N 100°03′56″W
- Area: 1.5 acres (0.61 ha)
- Built: 1912
- Architect: Black Hills Company
- Architectural style: Classical Revival
- MPS: County Courthouses of South Dakota MPS
- NRHP reference No.: 01000414
- Added to NRHP: April 25, 2001

The Sully County Courthouse, at Main and Ash Sts. in Onida, South Dakota, was built in 1912. It was listed on the National Register of Historic Places in 2001.

It is a three-story Classical Revival-style stone building with a cupola that serves as a clock tower.

The building has an entablature with a dentil molding. It was designed by W. M. Rich of the Black Hills Company, a Deadwood architecture firm.
