= Morrill County Courthouse =

- U.S. National Register of Historic Places
- U.S. Historic district
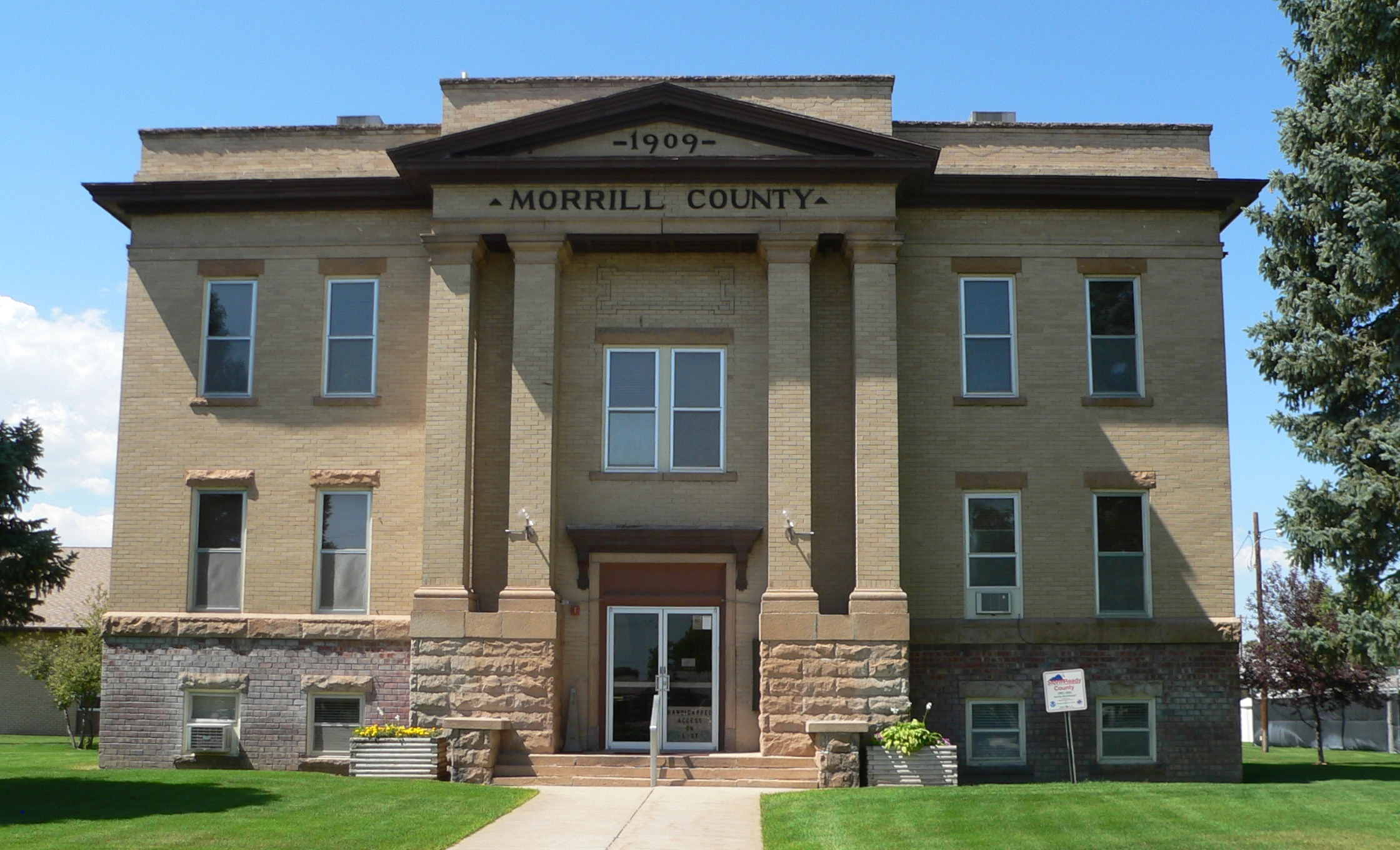

- Location within Nebraska Location within the United States
- Location: Main St. between 6th and 7th Sts., Bridgeport, Nebraska
- Coordinates: 41.66864°N 103.10006°W
- Area: 2 acres (0.81 ha)
- Built: 1909
- Architect: Eisentraut Company
- Architectural style: Classical Revival
- MPS: County Courthouses of Nebraska MPS
- NRHP reference No.: 89002227
- Added to NRHP: January 10, 1990

The Morrill County Courthouse, located on Main St. between 6th and 7th Sts. in Bridgeport, Nebraska, was built in 1909. It is a Classical Revival style building designed by the Eisentraut Company of Kansas City. It was listed on the National Register of Historic Places in 1990.

It was found to be historically significant as a center of local government, and architecturally significant as "an excellent example of public architecture in the community".
