= L.E. Snyder House =

Historic house in South Dakota, United States

- L. E. Snyder House
- U.S. National Register of Historic Places
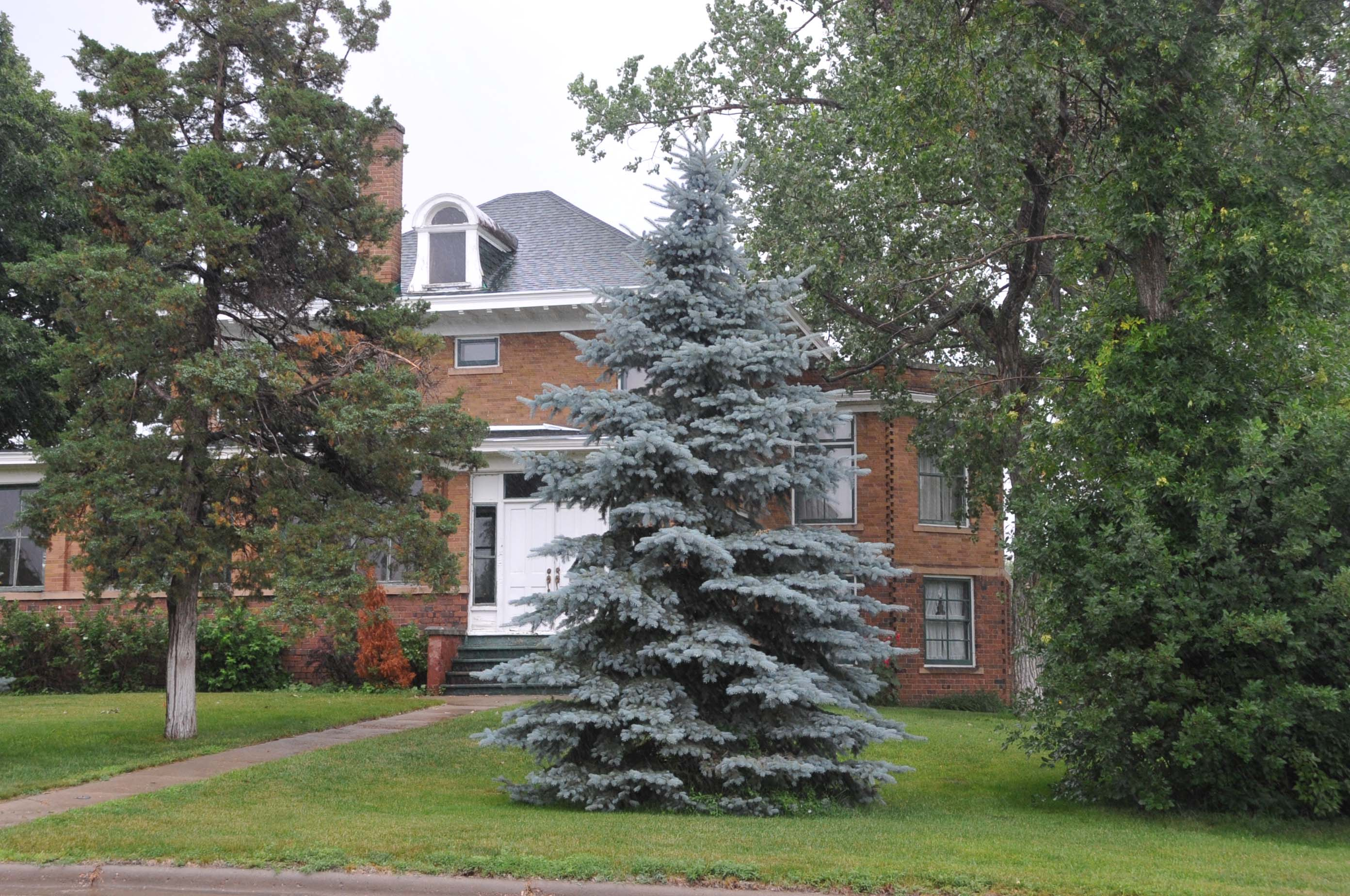

- Location within South Dakota Location within the United States
- Location: Jct. of Cedar and Sixth Sts., Onida, South Dakota
- Coordinates: 44°42′19″N 100°03′54″W
- Area: 2 acres (0.81 ha)
- Built: 1911
- Built by: Black Hills Company
- Architect: Black Hills Company
- Architectural style: American Foursquare
- NRHP reference No.: 93000784
- Added to NRHP: August 5, 1993

The L. E. Snyder House, at the corner of Cedar and Sixth Streets in Onida, South Dakota, is a brick house built in 1911. It was listed on the National Register of Historic Places in 1993.

It has also been known as the Hedman House and as the Voorhees House. It has elements of American Foursquare architecture. It was designed and built by the Black Hills Company, a Deadwood architecture and contracting firm.
