= Holabird, South Dakota =

- Unincorporated community
- Location within South Dakota Location within the United States
- Coordinates: 44°31′23″N 99°35′53″W
- Country: United States
- State: South Dakota
- County: Hyde
- Elevation: 1,791 ft (546 m)
- Time zone: UTC-6 (Central (CST))
  - Summer (DST): UTC-5 (CDT)
- ZIP codes: 57540
- GNIS feature ID: 1265655

Holabird is an unincorporated community in Hyde County, South Dakota, United States.

== History ==
Holabird was the maiden name of a railroad official's wife, the daughter of Connecticut lieutenant governor William S. Holabird. The community got its start when the railroad was extended to that point. A post office was established in Holabird in 1884 but is no longer in operation: Holabird mail services are provided by the post office in Highmore.
