= Potter County Courthouse (South Dakota) =

- U.S. National Register of Historic Places
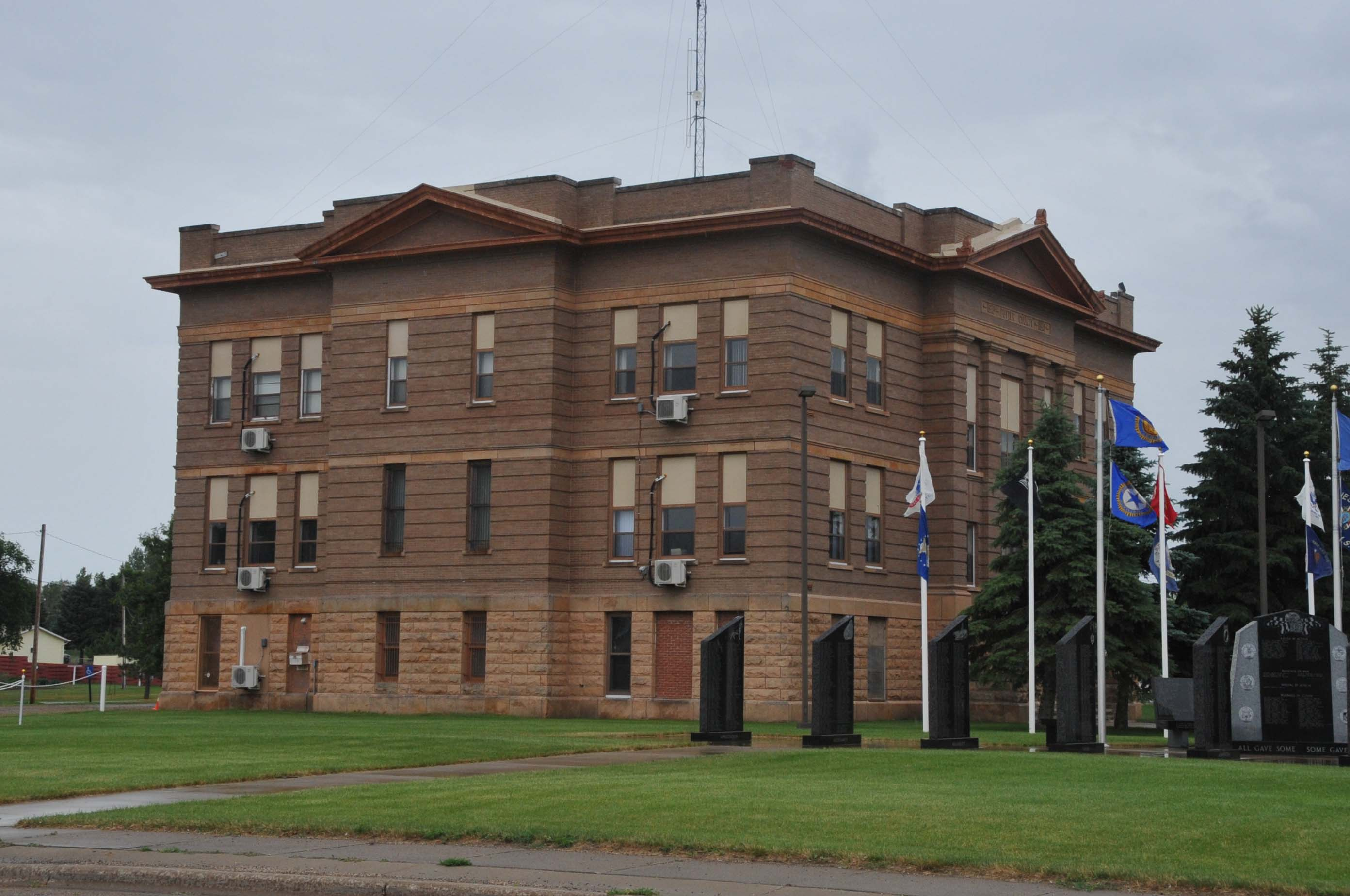

- Location within South Dakota Location within the United States
- Interactive map showing the location of Potter County Courthouse
- Location: 201 S. Exene St., Gettysburg, South Dakota
- Coordinates: 45°00′35″N 99°57′16″W
- Area: less than one acre
- Built: 1911
- Built by: Stolte & Mencier
- Architect: Black Hills Company
- Architectural style: Classical Revival
- MPS: County Courthouses of South Dakota MPS
- NRHP reference No.: 96000743
- Added to NRHP: July 5, 1996

The Potter County Courthouse in Gettysburg, South Dakota was built in 1911. Gettysburg won a war vs. an alternative county seat location. The Second Renaissance Revival-style building has Classical Revival-style influences. It was listed on the National Register of Historic Places in 1986.

The courthouse was designed by the Black Hills Company, a Deadwood-based architecture firm operated by architect John P. Eisentraut. The contractors were Stolte & Mencier of Redfield

Gettysburg was established as county seat after bitter dispute with Forest City, South Dakota. Forest City refused to give up the official papers of the county; Frank M. Byrne, later a governor of the state, was involved in a raid to obtain the papers.

It is a three-story building.
