= Hubert W. Woodruff =

American lawyer and politician (1923–2019)

Hubert W. Woodruff (July 14, 1923 – September 14, 2019) was an American lawyer and politician.

Woodruff was born in Onida, South Dakota. In 1940, he moved to Peoria, Illinois with his family and graduated from Peoria Central High School in 1941. He served in the United States Army Air Corps during World War II and was commissioned a lieutenant commander. Woodruff went to the University of West Virginia. He graduated from Bradley University in 1947 and the University of Illinois College of Law in 1949. Woodruff was admitted to the Illinois bar and practiced law in Peoria, Illinois. Woodruff served in the Illinois Senate from 1957 to 1961 and was a Republican. In 1963, Woodruff, his wife, and family moved to Salem, Illinois where he continued to practice law. Woodruff died in Salem, Illinois.
