= Woodbine, Iowa =

- City
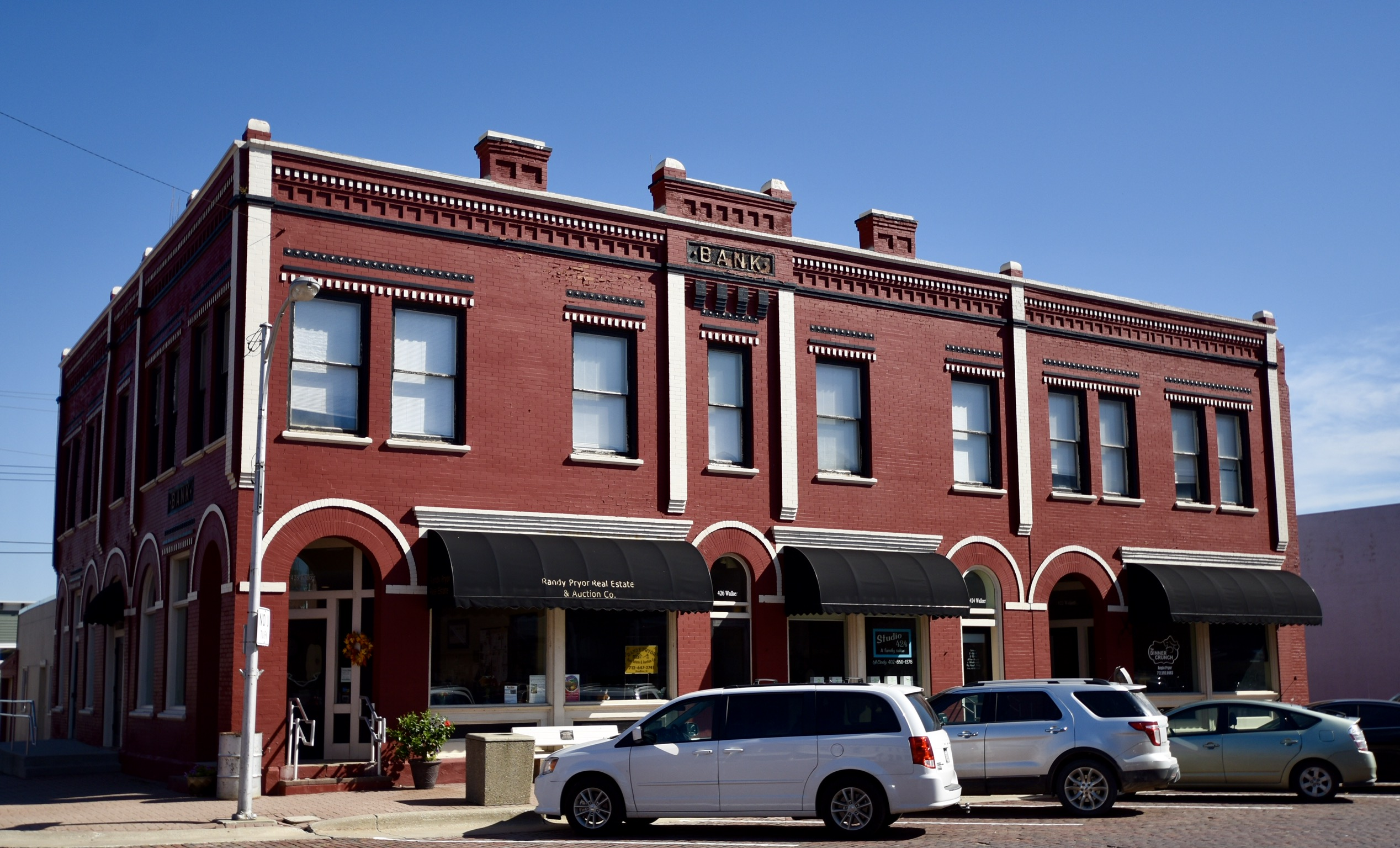
- Woodbine Savings Bank
- Nickname: Twinerville
- Motto: Nothing Finer Than A Woodbine Twiner.
- Location of Woodbine, Iowa

- Location within Iowa Location within the United States
- Coordinates: 41°44′09″N 95°42′40″W
- Country: USA
- State: Iowa
- County: Harrison
- Township: Boyer

Area
  - Total: 1.39 sq mi (3.59 km^{2})
  - Land: 1.34 sq mi (3.46 km^{2})
  - Water: 0.050 sq mi (0.13 km^{2})
- Elevation: 1,102 ft (336 m)

Population (2020)
  - Total: 1,625
  - Density: 1,215.8/sq mi (469.42/km^{2})
- Time zone: UTC-6 (Central (CST))
  - Summer (DST): UTC-5 (CDT)
- ZIP code: 51579
- Area code: 712
- FIPS code: 19-86835
- GNIS feature ID: 2397365
- Website: www.woodbineia.com

Woodbine is a city in Harrison County, Iowa, United States, along the Boyer River. The population was 1,625 at the time of the 2020 census.

== History ==
Woodbine was platted 1866 at the time the Chicago and North Western Railway was built through that territory. It was incorporated as a town in 1877. The town was named for the dense growth of the woodbine plant near the original town site.

== Geography ==
According to the United States Census Bureau, the city has a total area of 1.33 square miles (3.44 km^{2}), of which, 1.28 square miles (3.32 km^{2}) is land and 0.05 square miles (0.13 km^{2}) is water.

== Demographics ==
Historical populations
Year	Pop.	±%
1880	330	—
1890	815	+147.0%
1900	1,255	+54.0%
1910	1,538	+22.5%
1920	1,463	−4.9%
1930	1,348	−7.9%
1940	1,467	+8.8%
1950	1,304	−11.1%
1960	1,304	+0.0%
1970	1,349	+3.5%
1980	1,463	+8.5%
1990	1,500	+2.5%
2000	1,564	+4.3%
2010	1,459	−6.7%
2020	1,625	+11.4%
Source:"U.S. Census website". United States Census Bureau. and Iowa Data Center; Source: U.S. Decennial Census

=== 2020 census ===
As of the 2020 census, Woodbine had a population of 1,625 people, 651 households, and 417 families. The population density was 1,215.8 inhabitants per square mile (469.4/km^{2}). There were 727 housing units at an average density of 543.9 per square mile (210.0/km^{2}).

The median age was 39.6 years. 26.2% of residents were under the age of 18. 27.9% of residents were under the age of 20; 4.6% were from 20 to 24; 23.0% were from 25 to 44; 21.5% were from 45 to 64; and 23.1% were 65 years of age or older. The gender makeup of the city was 47.8% male and 52.2% female. For every 100 females, there were 91.4 males, and for every 100 females age 18 and over there were 86.6 males age 18 and over.

0.0% of residents lived in urban areas, while 100.0% lived in rural areas.

Among households, 31.3% had children under the age of 18 living with them. Of all households, 49.2% were married-couple households, 5.8% were cohabitating couple households, 17.5% were households with a male householder and no spouse or partner present, and 27.5% were households with a female householder and no spouse or partner present. 35.9% of all households were non-families; 32.0% of all households were made up of individuals, and 17.8% had someone living alone who was 65 years of age or older.

Of housing units, 10.5% were vacant. The homeowner vacancy rate was 1.4% and the rental vacancy rate was 11.7%.

Racial composition as of the 2020 census
Race	Number	Percent
White	1,558	95.9%
Black or African American	3	0.2%
American Indian and Alaska Native	1	0.1%
Asian	7	0.4%
Native Hawaiian and Other Pacific Islander	0	0.0%
Some other race	8	0.5%
Two or more races	48	3.0%
Hispanic or Latino (of any race)	37	2.3%

=== 2010 census ===
As of the census of 2010, there were 1,459 people, 611 households, and 389 families living in the city. The population density was 1,139.8 inhabitants per square mile (440.1/km^{2}). There were 679 housing units at an average density of 530.5 per square mile (204.8/km^{2}). The racial makeup of the city was 98.8% White, 0.1% African American, 0.1% Native American, 0.5% Asian, 0.2% from other races, and 0.3% from two or more races. Hispanic or Latino of any race were 0.8% of the population.

There were 611 households, of which 29.6% had children under the age of 18 living with them, 51.2% were married couples living together, 9.2% had a female householder with no husband present, 3.3% had a male householder with no wife present, and 36.3% were non-families. 32.7% of all households were made up of individuals, and 20.1% had someone living alone who was 65 years of age or older. The average household size was 2.29 and the average family size was 2.89.

The median age in the city was 44.9 years. 23.2% of residents were under the age of 18; 6.6% were between the ages of 18 and 24; 20.3% were from 25 to 44; 25.7% were from 45 to 64; and 24.2% were 65 years of age or older. The gender makeup of the city was 47.8% male and 52.2% female.

=== 2000 census ===
As of the census of 2000, there were 1,564 people, 647 households, and 416 families living in the city. The population density was 1,381.1 inhabitants per square mile (533.2/km^{2}). There were 696 housing units at an average density of 614.6 per square mile (237.3/km^{2}). The racial makeup of the city was 98.34% White, 0.06% African American, 0.51% Native American, 0.38% Asian, 0.13% from other races, and 0.58% from two or more races. Hispanic or Latino of any race were 0.70% of the population.

There were 647 households, out of which 27.8% had children under the age of 18 living with them, 53.2% were married couples living together, 9.4% had a female householder with no husband present, and 35.7% were non-families. 32.8% of all households were made up of individuals, and 21.8% had someone living alone who was 65 years of age or older. The average household size was 2.30 and the average family size was 2.93.

23.5% are under the age of 18, 7.5% from 18 to 24, 23.6% from 25 to 44, 18.4% from 45 to 64, and 27.1% who were 65 years of age or older. The median age was 41 years. For every 100 females, there were 84.4 males. For every 100 females age 18 and over, there were 77.6 males.

The median income for a household in the city was $30,083, and the median income for a family was $40,972. Males had a median income of $30,139 versus $22,589 for females. The per capita income for the city was $15,117. About 7.6% of families and 10.4% of the population were below the poverty line, including 14.1% of those under age 18 and 6.0% of those age 65 or over.

== Education ==
Woodbine Community School District operates public schools. There is also an adult learning center that teaches adult certificates from CDL, CNA, and commercial drone certificates.

== Culture ==
The Harrison County Genealogical Society is headquartered in a one-room schoolhouse, Merry Brook School Museum, built in the 1870s.

Woodbine is known for its annual Applefest, held the last Saturday of September since 1988.

== Notable people ==
- Charles W. Pugsley (1878–1940), U.S. Assistant Secretary of Agriculture, president of South Dakota State College of Agriculture and Mechanic Arts
