= Highmore, South Dakota =

- City
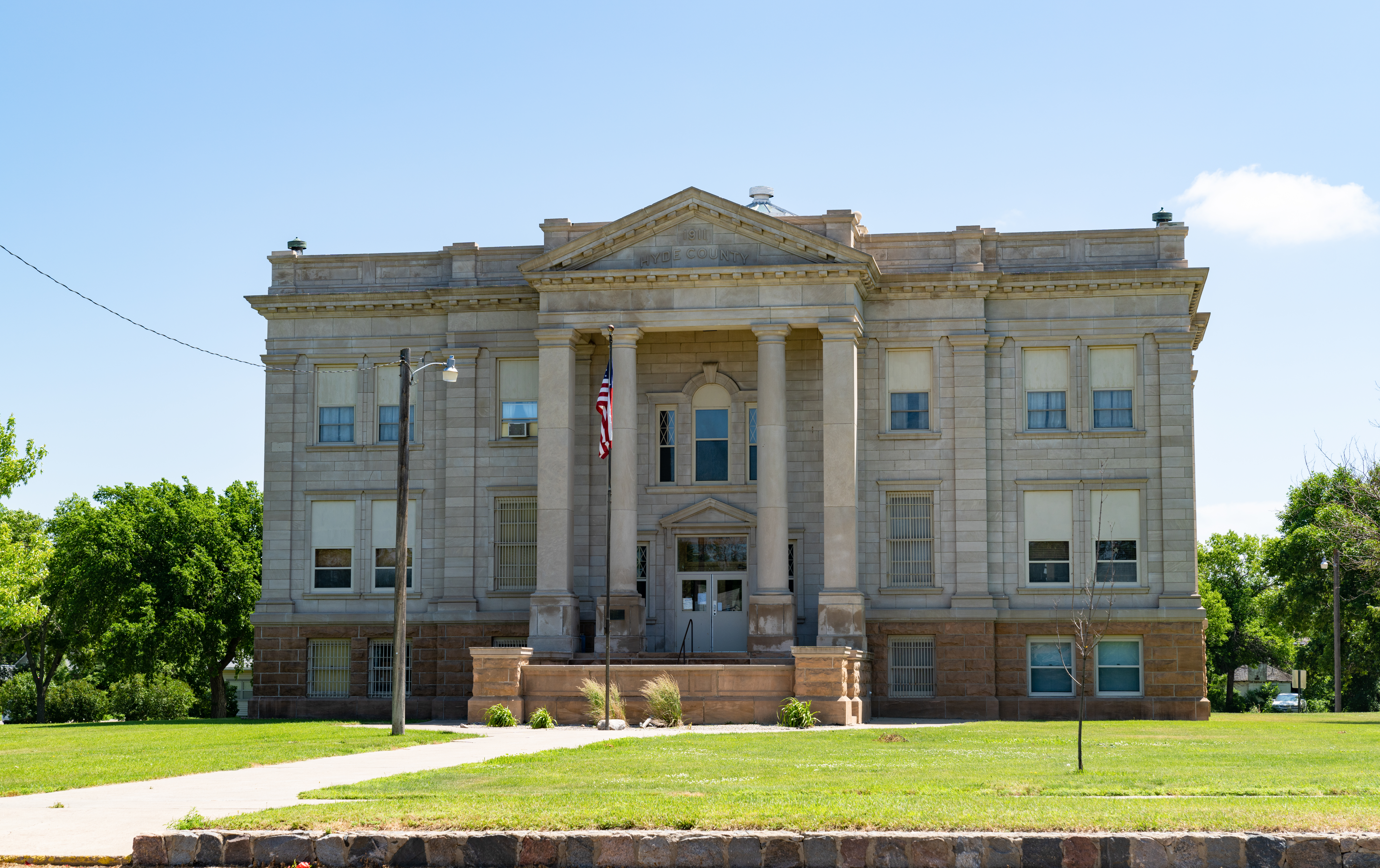
- Hyde County Courthouse
- Motto(s): "A Great Place To Live, Work, And Play"
- Location in Hyde County and the state of South Dakota
- Coordinates: 44°31′17″N 99°26′22″W
- Country: United States
- State: South Dakota
- County: Hyde
- Incorporated: 1882

Government
  - Mayor: Vikki M. Day

Area
  - Total: 1.88 sq mi (4.88 km^{2})
  - Land: 1.88 sq mi (4.88 km^{2})
  - Water: 0 sq mi (0.00 km^{2})
- Elevation: 1,883 ft (574 m)

Population (2020)
  - Total: 682
  - Density: 361.9/sq mi (139.72/km^{2})
- Time zone: UTC-6 (Central (CST))
  - Summer (DST): UTC-5 (CDT)
- ZIP code: 57345
- Area code: 605
- FIPS code: 46-28980
- GNIS feature ID: 1267422
- Website: highmoresd.govoffice3.com

Highmore is a city in and the county seat of Hyde County, South Dakota, United States. The population was 682 at the 2020 census.

== History ==
A post office called Highmore has been in operation since 1882. The city was named from its lofty elevation.

It was near Highmore that South Dakota Attorney General Jason Ravnsborg struck and killed a pedestrian in 2020.

In June 2026, severe storms with wind gusts of up to 131 MPH caused serious damage to many homes and buildings in and around Highmore.

== Geography ==
According to the United States Census Bureau, the city has a total area of 1.89 square miles (4.90 km^{2}), all land.

=== Climate ===
Highmore has a humid continental climate (Köppen climate classification: Dwa).

Climate data for Highmore, South Dakota (1991−2020 normals, extremes 1893−present)
Month	Jan	Feb	Mar	Apr	May	Jun	Jul	Aug	Sep	Oct	Nov	Dec	Year
Record high °F (°C)	64 (18)	70 (21)	86 (30)	98 (37)	108 (42)	112 (44)	113 (45)	113 (45)	108 (42)	97 (36)	81 (27)	68 (20)	113 (45)
Mean daily maximum °F (°C)	26.6 (−3.0)	31.7 (−0.2)	44.4 (6.9)	58.6 (14.8)	69.7 (20.9)	79.0 (26.1)	86.0 (30.0)	84.6 (29.2)	76.7 (24.8)	60.6 (15.9)	43.8 (6.6)	30.5 (−0.8)	57.7 (14.3)
Daily mean °F (°C)	16.6 (−8.6)	21.2 (−6.0)	33.1 (0.6)	45.5 (7.5)	56.8 (13.8)	66.9 (19.4)	73.2 (22.9)	71.5 (21.9)	63.1 (17.3)	48.3 (9.1)	33.1 (0.6)	21.0 (−6.1)	45.9 (7.7)
Mean daily minimum °F (°C)	6.6 (−14.1)	10.6 (−11.9)	21.7 (−5.7)	32.3 (0.2)	43.8 (6.6)	54.7 (12.6)	60.3 (15.7)	58.5 (14.7)	49.5 (9.7)	36.1 (2.3)	22.4 (−5.3)	11.6 (−11.3)	34.0 (1.1)
Record low °F (°C)	−45 (−43)	−41 (−41)	−26 (−32)	−4 (−20)	15 (−9)	26 (−3)	35 (2)	31 (−1)	10 (−12)	−11 (−24)	−23 (−31)	−36 (−38)	−45 (−43)
Average precipitation inches (mm)	0.36 (9.1)	0.62 (16)	1.07 (27)	2.52 (64)	3.69 (94)	4.03 (102)	2.97 (75)	2.60 (66)	2.02 (51)	1.86 (47)	0.55 (14)	0.47 (12)	22.76 (578)
Average snowfall inches (cm)	6.7 (17)	9.5 (24)	5.8 (15)	4.8 (12)	0.0 (0.0)	0.0 (0.0)	0.0 (0.0)	0.0 (0.0)	0.0 (0.0)	1.3 (3.3)	5.5 (14)	6.4 (16)	40.0 (102)
Average precipitation days (≥ 0.01 in)	3.1	3.5	3.9	6.0	7.9	8.5	6.1	4.9	4.4	4.2	2.7	2.7	57.9
Average snowy days (≥ 0.1 in)	2.9	3.0	2.1	1.7	0.0	0.0	0.0	0.0	0.0	0.6	1.8	2.6	14.7
Source: NOAA

== Demographics ==
Historical population
Census	Pop.	Note	%±
1890	435		—
1900	376		−13.6%
1910	1,084		188.3%
1920	1,022		−5.7%
1930	1,034		1.2%
1940	1,136		9.9%
1950	1,158		1.9%
1960	1,078		−6.9%
1970	1,173		8.8%
1980	1,055		−10.1%
1990	835		−20.9%
2000	851		1.9%
2010	795		−6.6%
2020	682		−14.2%
U.S. Decennial Census

=== 2020 census ===
As of the 2020 census, Highmore had a population of 682 and a median age of 45.8 years; 22.6% of residents were under the age of 18 and 27.0% were 65 years of age or older. For every 100 females there were 93.8 males, and for every 100 females age 18 and over there were 87.2 males age 18 and over.

All residents were counted in rural areas and none were counted in urban areas in 2020.

There were 286 households in Highmore, of which 29.0% had children under the age of 18 living in them. Of all households, 50.0% were married-couple households, 18.2% were households with a male householder and no spouse or partner present, and 25.2% were households with a female householder and no spouse or partner present. About 33.5% of all households were made up of individuals, and 15.0% had someone living alone who was 65 years of age or older.

The city contained 336 housing units, of which 14.9% were vacant; the homeowner vacancy rate was 0.9% and the rental vacancy rate was 21.7%.

Racial composition as of the 2020 census
Race	Number	Percent
White	621	91.1%
Black or African American	1	0.1%
American Indian and Alaska Native	31	4.5%
Asian	3	0.4%
Native Hawaiian and Other Pacific Islander	0	0.0%
Some other race	1	0.1%
Two or more races	25	3.7%
Hispanic or Latino (of any race)	8	1.2%

=== 2010 census ===
As of the 2010 census, there were 795 people, 347 households, and 201 families residing in the city. The population density was 420.6 inhabitants per square mile (162.4/km^{2}). There were 393 housing units at an average density of 207.9 per square mile (80.3/km^{2}). The racial makeup of the city was 91.7% White, 6.5% Native American, 0.1% Asian, 0.4% from other races, and 1.3% from two or more races. Hispanic or Latino of any race were 1.9% of the population.

There were 347 households, of which 24.8% had children under the age of 18 living with them, 47.3% were married couples living together, 6.9% had a female householder with no husband present, 3.7% had a male householder with no wife present, and 42.1% were non-families. 39.8% of all households were made up of individuals, and 20.5% had someone living alone who was 65 years of age or older. The average household size was 2.18 and the average family size was 2.94.

The median age in the city was 47.4 years. 23.1% of residents were under the age of 18; 5.6% were between the ages of 18 and 24; 18.4% were from 25 to 44; 26.2% were from 45 to 64; and 26.8% were 65 years of age or older. The gender makeup of the city was 47.5% male and 52.5% female.

=== 2000 census ===
As of the 2000 census, there were 851 people, 378 households, and 210 families residing in the city. The population density was 445.3 inhabitants per square mile (171.9/km^{2}). There were 432 housing units at an average density of 226.0 per square mile (87.3/km^{2}). The racial makeup of the city was 95.89% White, 3.41% Native American, 0.24% Pacific Islander, and 0.47% from two or more races. Hispanic or Latino of any race were 0.12% of the population.

There were 378 households, out of which 26.2% had children under the age of 18 living with them, 45.8% were married couples living together, 6.3% had a female householder with no husband present, and 44.2% were non-families. 41.8% of all households were made up of individuals, and 25.1% had someone living alone who was 65 years of age or older. The average household size was 2.15 and the average family size was 2.99.

In the city, the population was spread out, with 23.1% under the age of 18, 5.6% from 18 to 24, 22.1% from 25 to 44, 21.4% from 45 to 64, and 27.7% who were 65 years of age or older. The median age was 45 years. For every 100 females, there were 83.8 males. For every 100 females age 18 and over, there were 79.7 males.

The median income for a household in the city was $29,135, and the median income for a family was $45,469. Males had a median income of $30,227 versus $20,000 for females. The per capita income for the city was $17,309. About 3.3% of families and 8.2% of the population were below the poverty line, including 4.2% of those under age 18 and 18.5% of those age 65 or over.

== See also ==
- List of cities in South Dakota
