= Onida, South Dakota =

- City
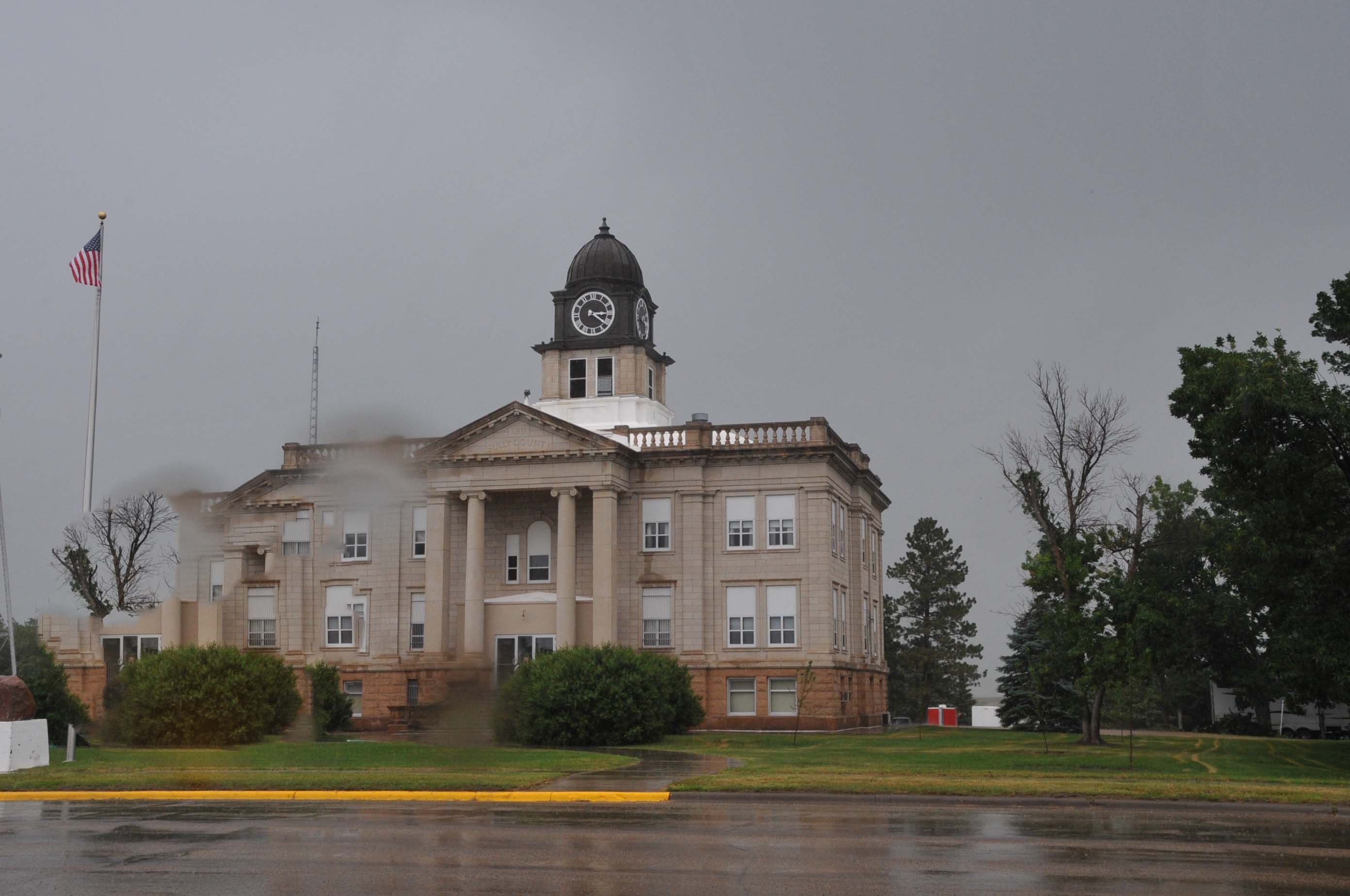
- Sully County Courthouse, July 2013

- Location in Sully County and the state of South Dakota
- Coordinates: 44°42′18″N 100°04′03″W
- Country: United States
- State: South Dakota
- County: Sully
- Founded: 1880
- Incorporated: 1883

Area
  - Total: 0.67 sq mi (1.74 km^{2})
  - Land: 0.67 sq mi (1.74 km^{2})
  - Water: 0 sq mi (0.00 km^{2})
- Elevation: 1,870 ft (570 m)

Population (2020)
  - Total: 666
  - Density: 990.8/sq mi (382.55/km^{2})
- Time zone: UTC-6 (Central (CST))
  - Summer (DST): UTC-5 (CDT)
- ZIP code: 57564
- Area code: 605
- FIPS code: 46-47180
- GNIS feature ID: 1267524
- Website: www.onida.org

Onida is a city in and the county seat of Sully County, South Dakota, United States. The population was 666 as of the 2020 census.

== History ==
Onida was founded in 1880 by settlers from Oneida, New York. It received its city rights in 1883.

== Geography ==
According to the United States Census Bureau, the city has a total area of 0.64 square miles (1.66 km^{2}), all land.

=== Climate ===
Climate data for Onida 4 NW, South Dakota (1991−2020 normals, extremes 1921−present)
Month	Jan	Feb	Mar	Apr	May	Jun	Jul	Aug	Sep	Oct	Nov	Dec	Year
Record high °F (°C)	63 (17)	71 (22)	86 (30)	98 (37)	103 (39)	112 (44)	116 (47)	112 (44)	108 (42)	95 (35)	81 (27)	73 (23)	116 (47)
Mean daily maximum °F (°C)	26.5 (−3.1)	31.0 (−0.6)	44.2 (6.8)	57.8 (14.3)	69.3 (20.7)	79.6 (26.4)	87.4 (30.8)	85.2 (29.6)	76.5 (24.7)	59.7 (15.4)	43.3 (6.3)	29.9 (−1.2)	57.5 (14.2)
Daily mean °F (°C)	16.9 (−8.4)	21.0 (−6.1)	33.3 (0.7)	45.5 (7.5)	57.1 (13.9)	67.6 (19.8)	74.4 (23.6)	72.0 (22.2)	63.0 (17.2)	47.8 (8.8)	32.9 (0.5)	20.7 (−6.3)	46.0 (7.8)
Mean daily minimum °F (°C)	7.4 (−13.7)	10.9 (−11.7)	22.3 (−5.4)	33.2 (0.7)	44.9 (7.2)	55.6 (13.1)	61.3 (16.3)	58.9 (14.9)	49.4 (9.7)	35.9 (2.2)	22.6 (−5.2)	11.6 (−11.3)	34.5 (1.4)
Record low °F (°C)	−40 (−40)	−38 (−39)	−24 (−31)	−3 (−19)	17 (−8)	32 (0)	38 (3)	33 (1)	13 (−11)	−2 (−19)	−21 (−29)	−32 (−36)	−40 (−40)
Average precipitation inches (mm)	0.54 (14)	0.79 (20)	0.97 (25)	1.96 (50)	3.17 (81)	3.63 (92)	2.52 (64)	2.51 (64)	1.78 (45)	1.93 (49)	0.68 (17)	0.59 (15)	21.07 (535)
Average snowfall inches (cm)	7.4 (19)	9.4 (24)	7.9 (20)	6.5 (17)	0.1 (0.25)	0.0 (0.0)	0.0 (0.0)	0.0 (0.0)	0.0 (0.0)	3.0 (7.6)	6.8 (17)	7.7 (20)	48.8 (124)
Average precipitation days (≥ 0.01 in)	6.8	6.6	6.7	7.8	10.2	10.7	8.6	7.2	6.1	7.0	5.7	6.4	89.8
Average snowy days (≥ 0.1 in)	6.1	5.7	4.6	2.2	0.1	0.0	0.0	0.0	0.0	1.0	3.3	5.3	28.3
Source: NOAA

== Demographics ==
Historical population
Census	Pop.	Note	%±
1910	319		—
1920	455		42.6%
1930	636		39.8%
1940	597		−6.1%
1950	822		37.7%
1960	843		2.6%
1970	785		−6.9%
1980	851		8.4%
1990	761		−10.6%
2000	740		−2.8%
2010	658		−11.1%
2020	666		1.2%
U.S. Decennial Census

=== 2020 census ===
As of the 2020 census, Onida had a population of 666. The median age was 38.0 years. 25.5% of residents were under the age of 18 and 16.8% of residents were 65 years of age or older. For every 100 females there were 99.4 males, and for every 100 females age 18 and over there were 101.6 males age 18 and over.

0.0% of residents lived in urban areas, while 100.0% lived in rural areas.

There were 274 households in Onida, of which 29.9% had children under the age of 18 living in them. Of all households, 54.7% were married-couple households, 19.3% were households with a male householder and no spouse or partner present, and 17.2% were households with a female householder and no spouse or partner present. About 27.4% of all households were made up of individuals and 11.0% had someone living alone who was 65 years of age or older.

There were 335 housing units, of which 18.2% were vacant. The homeowner vacancy rate was 0.0% and the rental vacancy rate was 31.4%.

Racial composition as of the 2020 census
Race	Number	Percent
White	605	90.8%
Black or African American	1	0.2%
American Indian and Alaska Native	6	0.9%
Asian	5	0.8%
Native Hawaiian and Other Pacific Islander	0	0.0%
Some other race	9	1.4%
Two or more races	40	6.0%
Hispanic or Latino (of any race)	22	3.3%

=== 2010 census ===
As of the census of 2010, there were 658 people, 280 households, and 186 families residing in the city. The population density was 1,028.1 inhabitants per square mile (397.0/km^{2}). There were 331 housing units at an average density of 517.2 per square mile (199.7/km^{2}). The racial makeup of the city was 95.4% White, 1.8% Native American, and 2.7% from two or more races. Hispanic or Latino people of any race were 0.8% of the population.

There were 280 households, of which 33.9% had children under the age of 18 living with them, 57.1% were married couples living together, 6.1% had a female householder with no husband present, 3.2% had a male householder with no wife present, and 33.6% were non-families. 30.4% of all households were made up of individuals, and 9.6% had someone living alone who was 65 years of age or older. The average household size was 2.35 and the average family size was 2.91.

The median age in the city was 42.7 years. 25.8% of residents were under the age of 18; 4.1% were between the ages of 18 and 24; 23.2% were from 25 to 44; 29.9% were from 45 to 64; and 17% were 65 years of age or older. The gender makeup of the city was 53.5% male and 46.5% female.

=== 2000 census ===
As of the census of 2000, there were 740 people, 299 households, and 200 families residing in the city. The population density was 1,165.9 inhabitants per square mile (450.2/km^{2}). There were 329 housing units at an average density of 518.3 per square mile (200.1/km^{2}). The racial makeup of the city was 98.51% White, 0.54% Native American, and 0.95% from two or more races. Hispanic or Latino people of any race were 0.41% of the population.

There were 299 households, out of which 35.5% had children under the age of 18 living with them, 59.5% were married couples living together, 4.7% had a female householder with no husband present, and 32.8% were non-families. 28.8% of all households were made up of individuals, and 12.4% had someone living alone who was 65 years of age or older. The average household size was 2.47 and the average family size was 3.10.

In the city, the population was spread out, with 28.4% under the age of 18, 6.1% from 18 to 24, 29.2% from 25 to 44, 22.6% from 45 to 64, and 13.8% who were 65 years of age or older. The median age was 37 years. For every 100 females, there were 101.1 males. For every 100 females age 18 and over, there were 101.5 males.

The median income for a household in the city was $35,750, and the median income for a family was $44,583. Males had a median income of $27,692 versus $22,266 for females. The per capita income for the city was $19,340. About 5.0% of families and 5.2% of the population were below the poverty line, including 4.4% of those under age 18 and 11.8% of those age 65 or over.

== Notable people ==
- Curt Byrum, professional golfer; has played on the PGA Tour and the Nationwide Tour; brother of Tom Byrum
- Tom Byrum, professional golfer; has played on the PGA Tour; brother of Curt Byrum
- Hubert W. Woodruff, Illinois state senator and lawyer; he was born in Onida.

== See also ==
- List of cities in South Dakota
