= List of courthouses in Arizona =

Following is a list of courthouses in Arizona at the state, county, and federal level. Each entry indicates the name of the building along with an image, if available, its location and the jurisdiction it covers.

== County courthouses ==
Courthouse	Image	County	Location	Built	Notes
Apache County Courthouse		Apache	70 W 3rd South, Saint Johns		
Tombstone Courthouse State Historic Park		Cochise	Tombstone, Arizona; 31°42′38.99″N 110°4′10.01″W	1882	Original Cochise County Courthouse. NRHP-listed (refnum 72000196).
Coconino County Courthouse		Coconino	200 N. San Francisco St, Flagstaff		
Gila County Courthouse		Gila	Oak and Broad Sts. Globe; 33°23′46″N 110°47′11″W	1906	NRHP-listed (refnum 75000347).
Graham County Courthouse		Graham	800 Main St., Safford; 32°49′59″N 109°42′57″W		Classical Revival architecture, NRHP-listed (refnum 82002077).
La Paz County Courthouse		La Paz	1316 Kofa Ave, Parker		
Maricopa County Courthouse		Maricopa	125 W. Washington St., Phoenix; 33°26′53″N 112°4′29″W		NRHP-listed (refnum 88003237).
Mohave County Courthouse and Jail		Mohave	Kingman; 35°11′31″N 114°3′7″W	1915	Neo-Classical architecture, designed by Lescher & Kibbey. NRHP-listed (refnum 83002990).
Navajo County Courthouse		Navajo	Courthouse Sq., Holbrook; 34°54′12″N 110°09′24″W		NRHP-listed (refnum 78000556).
Pima County Courthouse		Pima	115 N. Church St., Tucson; 32°13′23″N 110°58′21″W	1930	Mission Revival former courthouse designed by Roy Place. NRHP-listed (refnum 78000566).
Second Pinal County Courthouse		Pinal	Pinal and 12th Sts., Florence; 33°1′56″N 111°23′6″W	1891	Late Victorian-style brick building, replaced as courthouse in 1961, closed in 2005. NRHP-listed (refnum 78000568).
Santa Cruz County Courthouse		Santa Cruz	Court Street and Morley Avenue, Nogales; 31°20′11″N 110°56′16″W		NRHP-listed (refnum 77000239).
Yavapai County Courthouse		Yavapai	Courthouse Sq., Prescott; 34°32′27″N 112°28′06″W	1918	Greek Revival architecture. NRHP-listed (refnum 77000241).
Yuma County Courthouse		Yuma	168 S. 2nd Ave., Yuma; 32°43′26″N 114°37′18″W		NRHP-listed (refnum 82001661).

Missing are courthouses for counties of Greenlee, Apache, La Paz, and Coconino. Their respective county seats are Clifton, St. Johns, Parker, and Flagstaff. The courthouse present for Cochise County is not the current courthouse, which is in the county seat of Bisbee. This newest courthouse dates from the early 1930s.

== United States federal courthouses ==
Courthouse	City	Image	Street address	Jurisdiction	First used	Last used	Notes
U.S. Post Office & Courthouse†	Globe		101 South Hill Street	D. Ariz.	1928	?	Still in use as a post office.
U.S. Post Office & Courthouse	Phoenix		1st Avenue and Van Buren Street	D. Ariz.	1913	1961	Razed in 1961.
Federal Building	Phoenix		230 North First Avenue	D. Ariz.	1961	present	
Sandra Day O'Connor U.S. Courthouse	Phoenix		401 West Washington Street	D. Ariz.	2000	present	Named after Supreme Court justice Sandra Day O'Connor.
U.S. Post Office & Courthouse^{†}	Prescott		101 West Goodwin Street	D. Ariz.	1931	present	
James A. Walsh U.S. Courthouse	Tucson		55 East Broadway	D. Ariz.	1930	present	Named after District Court judge James Augustine Walsh in 1985.
Evo A. DeConcini U.S. Courthouse	Tucson		405 West Congress Street	D. Ariz.	2000	present	Named after Arizona Supreme Court justice Evo Anton DeConcini.
United States Court House	Yuma		315 West 19th Street	D. Ariz.	?	2014	
John M. Roll U.S. Courthouse	Yuma		98 West 1st Street Yuma, AZ	D. Ariz.	2014	present	Named after District Chief judge John Roll.

== See also ==
- List of Federal courthouses in the United States
