= List of county courthouses in Arizona =

This is a list of county courthouses in Arizona. Each county in Arizona has a city that is the county seat where the county government resides, including a county courthouse.

Courthouse	Image	County	Location	Built	Notes
Apache County Courthouse		Apache	70 W 3rd South, Saint Johns		
Tombstone Courthouse State Historic Park		Cochise	Tombstone, Arizona; 31°42′38.99″N 110°4′10.01″W	1882	Original Cochise County Courthouse. NRHP-listed (refnum 72000196).
Coconino County Courthouse		Coconino	200 N. San Francisco St, Flagstaff		
Gila County Courthouse		Gila	Oak and Broad Sts. Globe; 33°23′46″N 110°47′11″W	1906	NRHP-listed (refnum 75000347).
Graham County Courthouse		Graham	800 Main St., Safford; 32°49′59″N 109°42′57″W		Classical Revival architecture, NRHP-listed (refnum 82002077).
La Paz County Courthouse		La Paz	1316 Kofa Ave, Parker		
Maricopa County Courthouse		Maricopa	125 W. Washington St., Phoenix; 33°26′53″N 112°4′29″W		NRHP-listed (refnum 88003237).
Mohave County Courthouse and Jail		Mohave	Kingman; 35°11′31″N 114°3′7″W	1915	Neo-Classical architecture, designed by Lescher & Kibbey. NRHP-listed (refnum 83002990).
Navajo County Courthouse		Navajo	Courthouse Sq., Holbrook; 34°54′12″N 110°09′24″W		NRHP-listed (refnum 78000556).
Pima County Courthouse		Pima	115 N. Church St., Tucson; 32°13′23″N 110°58′21″W	1930	Mission Revival former courthouse designed by Roy Place. NRHP-listed (refnum 78000566).
Second Pinal County Courthouse		Pinal	Pinal and 12th Sts., Florence; 33°1′56″N 111°23′6″W	1891	Late Victorian-style brick building, replaced as courthouse in 1961, closed in 2005. NRHP-listed (refnum 78000568).
Santa Cruz County Courthouse		Santa Cruz	Court Street and Morley Avenue, Nogales; 31°20′11″N 110°56′16″W		NRHP-listed (refnum 77000239).
Yavapai County Courthouse		Yavapai	Courthouse Sq., Prescott; 34°32′27″N 112°28′06″W	1918	Greek Revival architecture. NRHP-listed (refnum 77000241).
Yuma County Courthouse		Yuma	168 S. 2nd Ave., Yuma; 32°43′26″N 114°37′18″W		NRHP-listed (refnum 82001661).

== See also ==
- List of United States federal courthouses in Arizona
- List of United States federal courthouses (nationwide)
- List of county courthouses in the United States (nationwide)
