= List of United States post offices in Arizona =

United States post offices operate under the authority of the United States Post Office Department (1792–1971) or the United States Postal Service (since 1971). Historically, post offices were usually placed in a prominent location. Many were architecturally distinctive, including notable buildings featuring Beaux-Arts, Art Deco, and Vernacular architecture. However, modern U.S. post offices were generally designed for functionality rather than architectural style.

Following is a list of United States post offices in Arizona. Notable post offices include individual buildings, whether still in service or not, which have architectural, historical, or community-related significance. Many of these are listed on the National Register of Historic Places (NRHP) or state and local historic registers.

Post office	City	Date built	Image	Architect	Notes	Ref.
American Flag Post Office Ranch	American Flag	c. 1880		Isaac Lorraine	(Note: Listed on the National Register of Historic Places.)	
Cochise Hotel	Cochise	1882		unknown		
United States Post Office and Customs House–Douglas Main	Douglas	1915		James A. Wetmore		
United States Post Office and Courthouse–Globe Main	Globe	1926		James A. Wetmore		
United States Post Office (Kingman, Arizona)	Kingman	1925		Louis A. Simon, Neal A. Melick		
United States Post Office and Immigration Station – Nogales Main	Nogales	1923		Devault & Deitrick, James A. Wetmore		
Acadia Ranch	Oracle	1880s		unknown		
United States Post Office (Phoenix, Arizona)	Phoenix	1932–1936		Lescher & Mahoney		
United States Post Office and Courthouse–Prescott Main	Prescott	1931		James A. Wetmore, Robert McKee		
Stinson-Flake House	Snowflake	1878		unknown		
Supai Post Office	Supai					
Andre Building	Tempe	1875		James M. Creighton		
James A. Walsh United States Courthouse	Tucson	1929–1930		James A. Wetmore		
Old Brick Post Office (Wickenburg, Arizona)	Wickenburg	1909–1915		Unknown		
United States Post Office (Winslow, Arizona)	Winslow	1935		Louis A. Simon, Neal A. Melick		
United States Post Office–Yuma Main	Yuma	1933		Roy Place		
