= List of United States federal courthouses in Arizona =

Following is a list of current and former courthouses of the United States federal court system located in Arizona. Each entry indicates the name of the building along with an image, if available, its location and the jurisdiction it covers, the dates during which it was used for each such jurisdiction, and, if applicable the person for whom it was named, and the date of renaming. Dates of use will not necessarily correspond with the dates of construction or demolition of a building, as pre-existing structures may be adapted for court use, and former court buildings may later be put to other uses. Also, the official name of the building may be changed at some point after its use as a federal court building has been initiated.

== Courthouses ==
Location of current courthouses

| Courthouse | City | Image | Street address | Jurisdiction | First used | Last used | Notes |
|---|---|---|---|---|---|---|---|
| U.S. Post Office & Courthouse† | Globe | | 101 South Hill Street | D. Ariz. | 1928 | ? | Still in use as a post office. |
| U.S. Post Office & Courthouse | Phoenix | | 1st Avenue and Van Buren Street | D. Ariz. | 1913 | 1961 | Razed in 1961. |
| Federal Building | Phoenix | | 230 North First Avenue | D. Ariz. | 1961 | present | |
| Sandra Day O'Connor U.S. Courthouse | Phoenix | | 401 West Washington Street | D. Ariz. | 2000 | present | Named after Supreme Court justice Sandra Day O'Connor. |
| U.S. Post Office & Courthouse^{†} | Prescott | | 101 West Goodwin Street | D. Ariz. | 1931 | present | |
| James A. Walsh U.S. Courthouse | Tucson | | 55 East Broadway | D. Ariz. | 1930 | present | Named after District Court judge James Augustine Walsh in 1985. |
| Evo A. DeConcini U.S. Courthouse | Tucson | | 405 West Congress Street | D. Ariz. | 2000 | present | Named after Arizona Supreme Court justice Evo Anton DeConcini. |
| United States Court House | Yuma | | 315 West 19th Street | D. Ariz. | ? | 2014 | |
| John M. Roll U.S. Courthouse | Yuma | | 98 West 1st Street Yuma, AZ | D. Ariz. | 2014 | present | Named after District Chief judge John Roll. |

== Key ==
| ^{†} | Listed on the National Register of Historic Places (NRHP) |
| ^{††} | NRHP-listed and also designated as a National Historic Landmark |

== See also ==
- List of United States federal courthouses (nationwide)
- List of courthouses in Arizona
