= American Flag (disambiguation) =

American Flag usually refers to the national flag of the United States.

American Flag may also refer to:

- American Flag, Arizona, a ghost town
- American Flag (horse), a racehorse
- Flag of the Organization of American States
- Flags of the U.S. states and territories

== See also ==
- American Flagg!, American comic book series
