= U.S. Immigration Office =

U.S. Immigration Office, or variations with Station or Building, may refer to:

- Angel Island, U.S. Immigration Station, near Tiburon, CA, listed on the NRHP in California
- U.S. Immigration Office (Honolulu, Hawaii), listed on the NRHP in Hawaii
- U.S. Immigration Building (Seattle, Washington), listed on the NRHP in King County, Washington
- U.S. Post Office and Immigration Station-Nogales Main, in Nogales, AZ, listed on the NRHP in Arizona
