= University of Arizona Mineral Museum =

Museum in Tucson, Arizona

Coordinates: 32.2325°N 110.9477°W

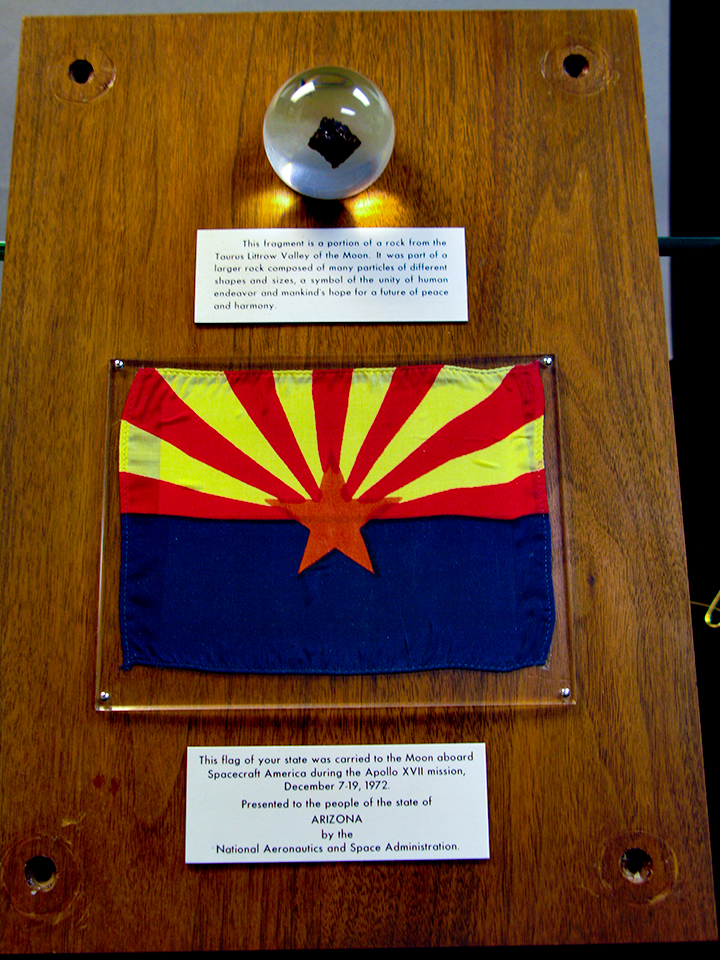
A fragment of Moon rock and an Arizona state flag which was taken to the Moon and back by Apollo 17 in 1972, on display at the museum

The University of Arizona Mineral Museum (UAMM) is a mineralogy museum located in the Pima County Courthouse in downtown Tucson, Arizona.

== Collections ==
The museum was started in 1892, and houses over 24,000 specimens from around the world, including meteorites, micromounts, and mining artifacts. Minerals from Arizona and Mexico are particularly well represented. Over 2,000 specimens are on display.

Also featured are a selection of oil paintings, depicting miners and mining, by Delaware artist William Davidson White (1896-1971).
