= Pioneer Hotel (Tucson, Arizona) =

Office building

Pioneer
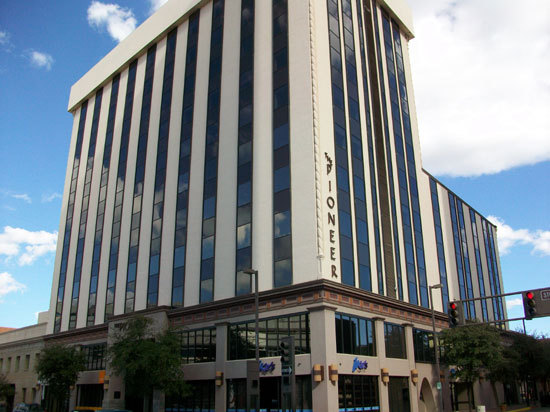
- The Pioneer Hotel Building in the downtown business district of Tucson, Arizona. The hotel now functions as a business office and apartment building.
- Interactive map of the Pioneer area

General information
- Location: 100 North Stone Avenue, Tucson, Arizona, United States, 85701
- Coordinates: 32°13′23.25″N 110°58′16.50″W
- Opening: December 12, 1929
- Owner: Pioneer Tucson LLC

Technical details
- Floor count: 11

Design and construction
- Architect: Roy Place

The Pioneer Hotel, designed by Tucson architect Roy Place, was one of Tucson's first high-rise buildings. Opened in 1929, the Spanish Revival hotel became the social center of the downtown business district. The property catered to the social elite. In the mid-20th century Harold and Margaret Steinfeld, owners of a large downtown department store, lived in the penthouse. A disastrous fire severely damaged the building in December 1970, and among the 29 victims were the Steinfelds. The building has been converted from a hotel to an office building.

Though it adds a rich layer of history to the business district of downtown Tucson, the Pioneer Hotel has not been listed in the National Register of Historic Places because of "irreversible integrity changes" made in the late 1970s and early 1980s. The "modernization" included stripping the building of its ornate cast-stone entryway and adding vertical glass striping in an attempt to up-date the building to reflect design trends popular in the middle to late 20th century.

Other changes included the covering of the building's rooftop terrace arcade, changing the storefront window configuration, and reconfiguration of the lobby.

The building is 11 stories tall and, when it opened in 1929, it housed the largest ballroom in the country.

In May 2024, Pioneer Tucson LLC, an affiliate of Skyline Real Estate in Beverly Hills, CA purchased the building and plans extension renovations to the lobby and common areas.

== Fire ==
Shortly after midnight on December 20, 1970, fire ripped through the landmark building. Twenty-nine people died in the fire, which ranks as the deadliest in Arizona's history.

A 16-year-old, Louis C. Taylor, was eventually imprisoned for starting the fire, but new evidence presented in November 2013 suggested that it may not have been arson. On April 2, 2013, the 58-year-old Taylor was released from prison after pleading no contest to the original charges and given credit for time served. The Arizona Justice Project (a Phoenix-based non-profit group of attorneys and law students, advocating for inmates believed to have been wrongfully convicted) filed a motion earlier in 2013 for a new trial, which would have been difficult, as key witnesses are now deceased, and key evidence has since been destroyed. Also, modern arson investigators are unable to determine a cause for the fire, even using modern investigative methods.

Taylor, who said he was at the hotel to score free drinks at a holiday party held by an aircraft company that night, knocked on room doors to alert guests to the fire and later helped put the injured on stretchers.

A fire investigator hired by the Arizona presented a profile suggesting that the arsonist was a young black man. Another investigator testified in Taylor's trial that an accelerant had been used in the fire, but that was not supported by laboratory tests and Taylor's lawyers were not aware of the test results. Taylor, who is mixed Hispanic and African American, was convicted by an all-white jury during a time of racial tension in Tucson.

After his release, Taylor struggled to adjust and had difficulties with finances. Four years later he would be arrested on a charge of armed robbery.

After the fire, developer Allan Elias converted the building to offices, with extensive remodeling and facade work in 1977. Later, John Hancock Mutual Life spent $1.3 million renovating the building, including hallways and other common areas.

A metal frame was added to the top of the building in the 1970s.

The building is currently owned by Pioneer Tucson LLC. An affiliate of Skyline Real Estate, one of the largest owners of manufactured housing communities and RV Parks in the nation.

== See also ==
- List of accidents and disasters by death toll § Structural fires
- List of hotel fires in the United States
