= Graham County Courthouse (Arizona) =

- U.S. National Register of Historic Places
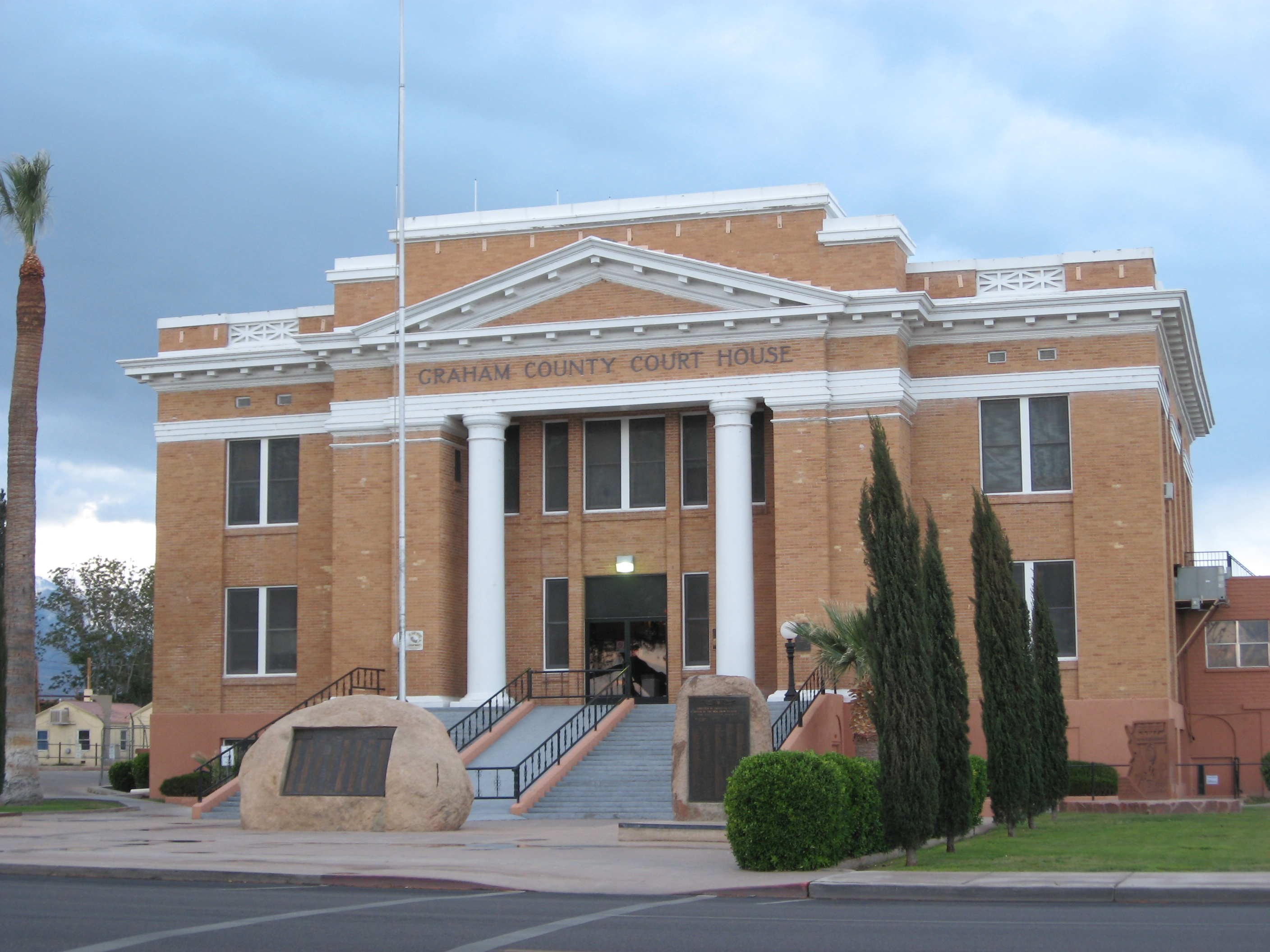
- Front of the courthouse

- Location within Arizona Location within the United States
- Location: 800 W. Main St., Safford, Arizona
- Coordinates: 32°49′59″N 109°42′57″W
- Built: 1916
- Built by: Lutgerding & Eagan, Inc.
- Architect: Lescher & Kibbey
- Architectural style: Classical Revival, Neo-Classic
- NRHP reference No.: 82002077
- Added to NRHP: May 25, 1982

The current Graham County Courthouse is a courthouse at 800 W. Main St. in Safford, Arizona that is listed on the National Register of Historic Places. It is a two-story red brick building above a concrete foundation that includes a raised basement. The main part of the east-facing building is 83 feet (25 m) by 62 feet (19 m), and there is a one-story 17 feet (5.2 m) by 49 feet (15 m) north wing made of brick, and a small ell in the back.

It is the fifth courthouse of the county, following one in Safford during 1881–83, two in Solomonville, Arizona during 1883–1915, and the 1901 Riggs building at Main and Central in Safford during 1915–16. After Arizona achieved statehood in 1912, Safford was chosen as the location for Graham's county seat in a 1915 election, moving it four miles west from Solomonville, the county seat since 1883. A$50,000 bond was authorized to finance construction of a courthouse with courtrooms, offices, and jail. The Classic Revival/Neo-Classic style courthouse was built in 1916. Its construction cost $44,404.

J. A. McAllister, a justice in the Arizona Supreme Court, and Jesse A. Udall, a chief justice of the Arizona Supreme Court, began their careers here.

In 1982, the interior public areas retained the original wooden moldings, interior doors, door trim, and wainscoting, and wooden balustrade and newel post of the main staircase. An ell at the back, 29 feet (8.8 m) by 49 feet (15 m), that held a jail, was demolished in 1978, leaving markings from where it joined on the current small ell at the back.

It was added to the National Register of Historic Places in 1982.

Although the building is historic, it still serves as location of Graham County's Superior Court, in 2016.

== Architectural Significance ==
The Neo Classic design of the Graham County Courthouse encapsulates the democratic symbolism inherent in Neoclassical architecture and establishes a connection between the building and other county courthouses in Arizona constructed during the early twentieth century. Neoclassical architecture was deliberately chosen to represent the democratic roots of the nation and was closely associated with the rising civic pride and nationalism during the turn of the twentieth century. The Neoclassical style emerged as the predominant national choice for public buildings, particularly those designated for government purposes, such as courthouses, schools, and city halls. This choice was especially fitting for Arizona, a state that had recently achieved statehood in 1912, and its citizens were eager to declare their new status. This enthusiasm is beautifully reflected in the architectural design of the Graham County Courthouse.

From a statewide perspective, the extensive adoption of the Neoclassical style for civic buildings is well-documented through Arizona's county courthouses. Between 1895 and 1918, ten Arizona counties erected courthouses, with eight of them featuring variations of Neoclassical architectural design. Collectively, these structures constitute a statewide representation of Neoclassical architecture and its prevalence in public buildings during the early twentieth century. The Graham County Courthouse is an integral part of this collective architectural statement.

The architects responsible for the design of the Graham County Courthouse, Royal W. Lescher and John Rinker Kibbey, played a significant role in shaping the early twentieth-century architectural landscape of Arizona. They designed numerous public buildings across the state, including the Mohave County Courthouse in Kingman, constructed in 1915. This courthouse, designed by Lescher and Kibbey, showcases a modest Neoclassical design that is architecturally akin to the Graham County Courthouse. Furthermore, the influence of Lescher and Kibbey extended to other structures in the Safford area. While working on the Graham County Courthouse in 1916, they were commissioned to design elementary schools in nearby communities such as Thatcher and Klondyke.

The strategic placement of the courthouse in Safford adds to its significance. Positioned within a meticulously landscaped public square at the end of Main Street, the courthouse stands as a pivotal architectural feature in the surrounding downtown area. This location not only accentuates the building's presence but also amplifies its historical and contemporary importance to both Safford and Graham County as a symbol of the county's governance. As the Graham County Courthouse continues to serve as the county offices, retaining its original architectural design, it contributes to the preservation of the historic context and the visual identity of downtown Safford.
