= United States Post Office (Kingman, Arizona) =

- U.S. Post Office
- U.S. National Register of Historic Places
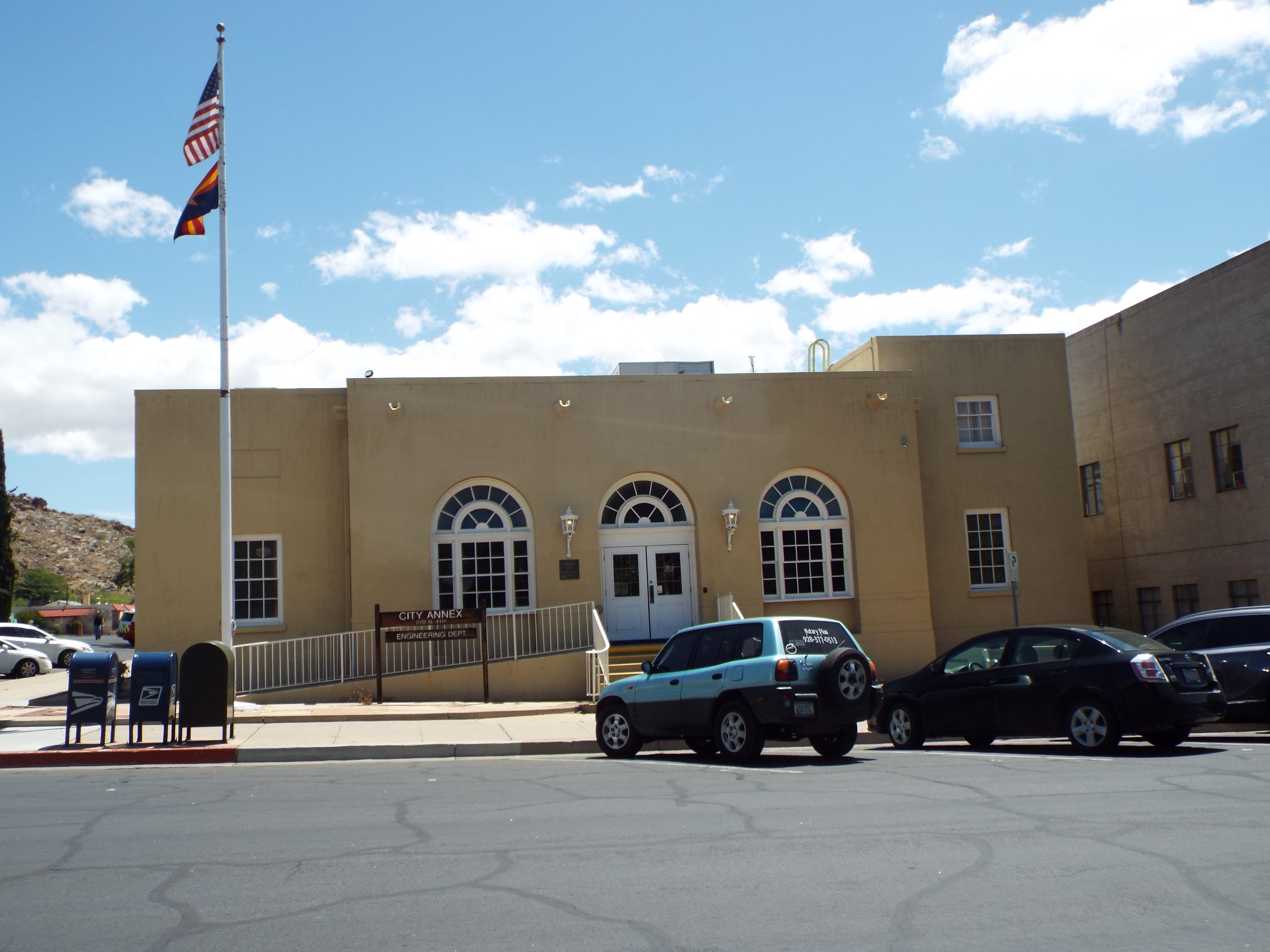

- Location within Arizona Location within the United States
- Location: 310 N. Fourth St., Kingman, Arizona
- Coordinates: 35°11′25″N 114°3′6″W
- Built: 1935
- Architect: Louis A. Simon; Neal A. Melick
- Architectural style: Late 19th and 20th Century Revivals
- MPS: Kingman MRA
- NRHP reference No.: 86001173
- Added to NRHP: May 14, 1986

The U. S. Post Office is a historic building located in Kingman, Arizona. The post office was built in 1935. The design of the post office is Period Revival with Italian influence. Louis A. Simon was the Supervisor Architect and Neal A. Melick was the Supervisor Engineer. The first post office building for Kingman, the earlier post offices were located in stores. Today the post office is owned by the City of Kingman and is used for office space in the downtown area. It is across the street from the Little Red School and around the corner of the street of the old Elks Lodge.

The building was listed on the National Register of Historic Places in 1986. It was evaluated for National Register listing as part of a 1985 study of 63 historic resources in Kingman that led to this and many others being listed.

== See also ==
- List of United States post offices
