= Old Brick Post Office (Wickenburg, Arizona) =

- U.S. National Register of Historic Places
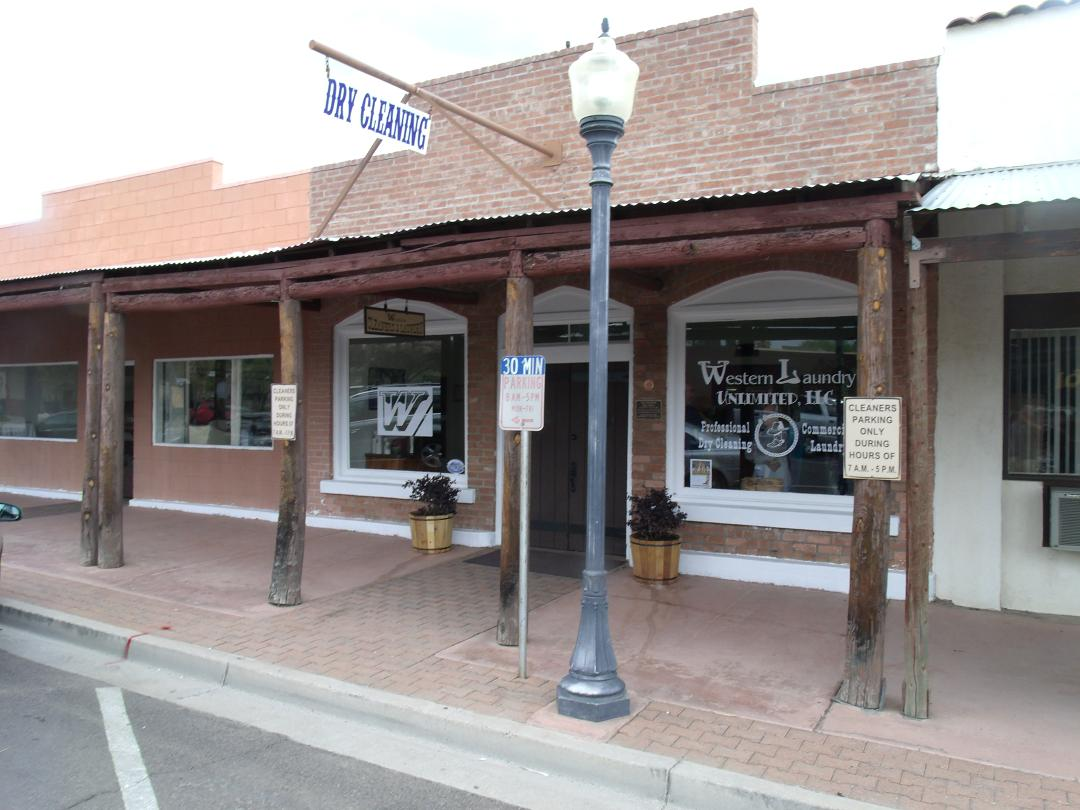

- Location within Arizona Location within the United States
- Location: 144 N. Frontier, Wickenburg, Arizona
- Coordinates: 33°58′9″N 112°43′50″W
- Area: less than one acre
- Built: 1909-15
- MPS: Wickenburg MRA
- NRHP reference No.: 86001586
- Added to NRHP: July 10, 1986

The Old Brick Post Office in Wickenburg, Arizona was built between 1909 and 1915. It served first as a grocery store and printing office, and eventually served as a post office. It was the office of the newspaper the Arizona State Miner in 1940.

It was listed on the US National Register of Historic Places in 1986.

== See also ==
- List of United States post offices
