= United States Post Office and Immigration Station – Nogales Main =

NRHP-listed building in Santa Cruz County, Arizona

- U.S. Post Office and Immigration Station – Nogales Main
- U.S. National Register of Historic Places
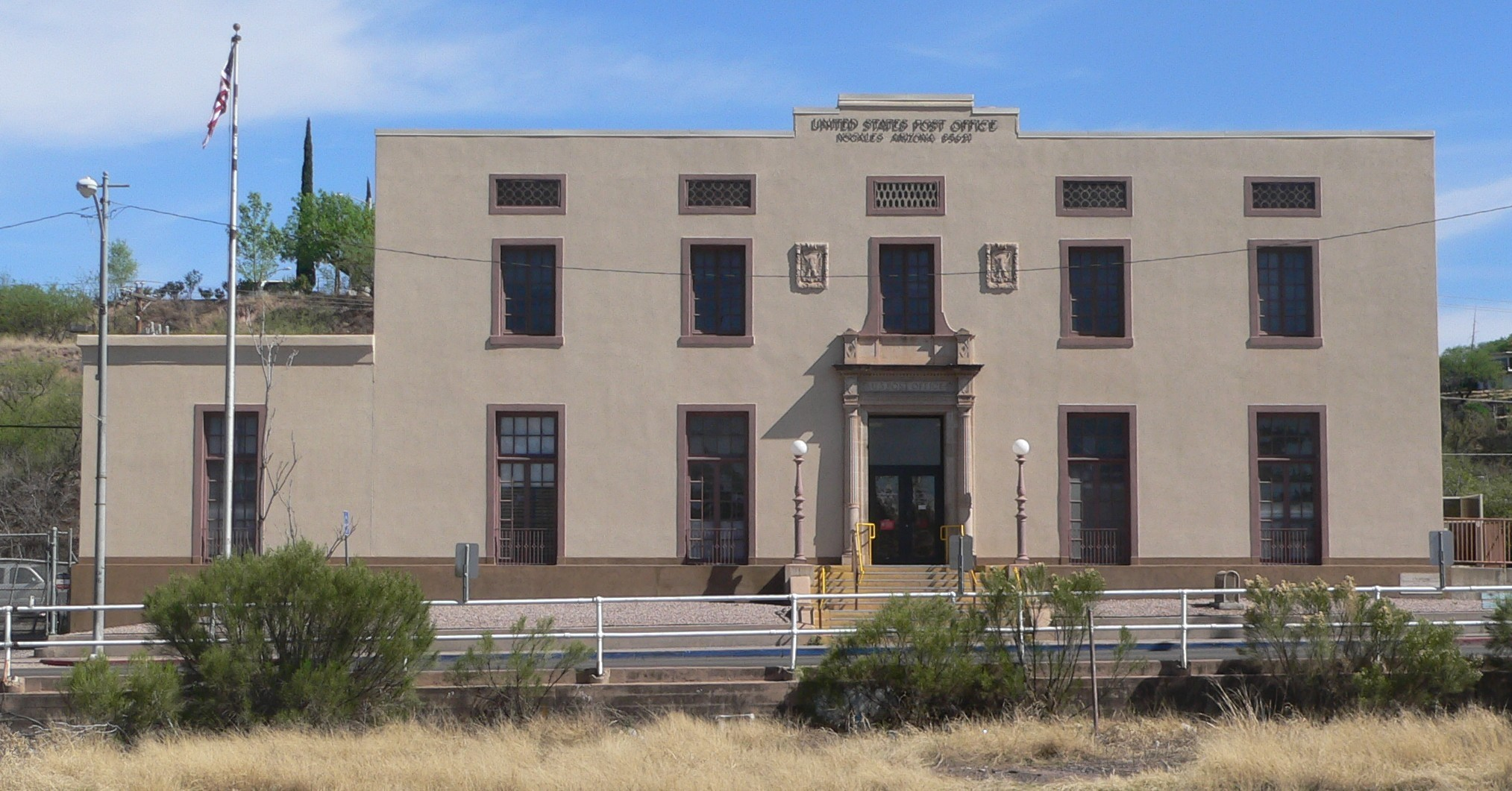

- Location within Arizona Location within the United States
- Location: Hudgin St. and Morley Ave., Nogales, Arizona
- Coordinates: 31°20′15″N 110°56′14″W
- Area: 0.7 acres (0.28 ha)
- Built: 1923
- Architect: Wetmore, James A.; Devault & Deitrick
- Architectural style: Classical Revival
- MPS: Historic US Post Offices in Arizona, 1900–1941, TR
- NRHP reference No.: 85003107
- Added to NRHP: December 3, 1985

The U.S. Post Office and Immigration Station – Nogales Main is a historic building in Nogales, Arizona, built in 1923. It is located one block east of Nogales' main commercial street, Morely Avenue, and one block from the Santa Cruz County Courthouse. It was listed for its architecture in the National Register of Historic Places in 1985. Also known as Nogales Main Post Office and Immigration Station, it served historically as a post office and as a government office building.

It is designed in a simplified Classical Revival architecture style with Spanish Colonial architecture influence. Ornamentation is limited, and mostly consists of the front entranceway's two columns and cornice.

== See also ==
- List of United States post offices
