= Pima County Courthouse =

- U.S. National Register of Historic Places
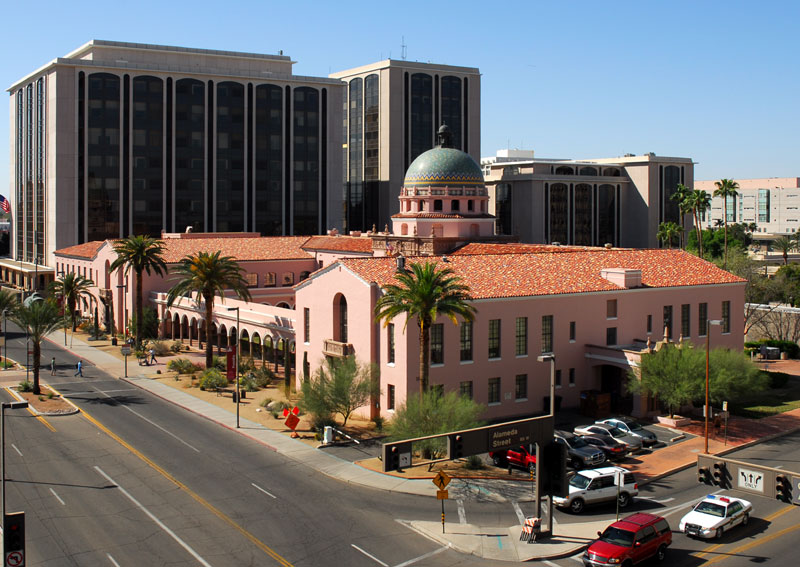
- Pima County Courthouse

- Location within Arizona Location within the United States
- Location: 115 N. Church St., Tucson, Arizona
- Coordinates: 32°13′23″N 110°58′21″W
- Built: 1930
- Architect: Roy Place
- Architectural style: Mission Revival–Spanish Colonial Revival
- NRHP reference No.: 78000566
- Added to NRHP: June 23, 1978

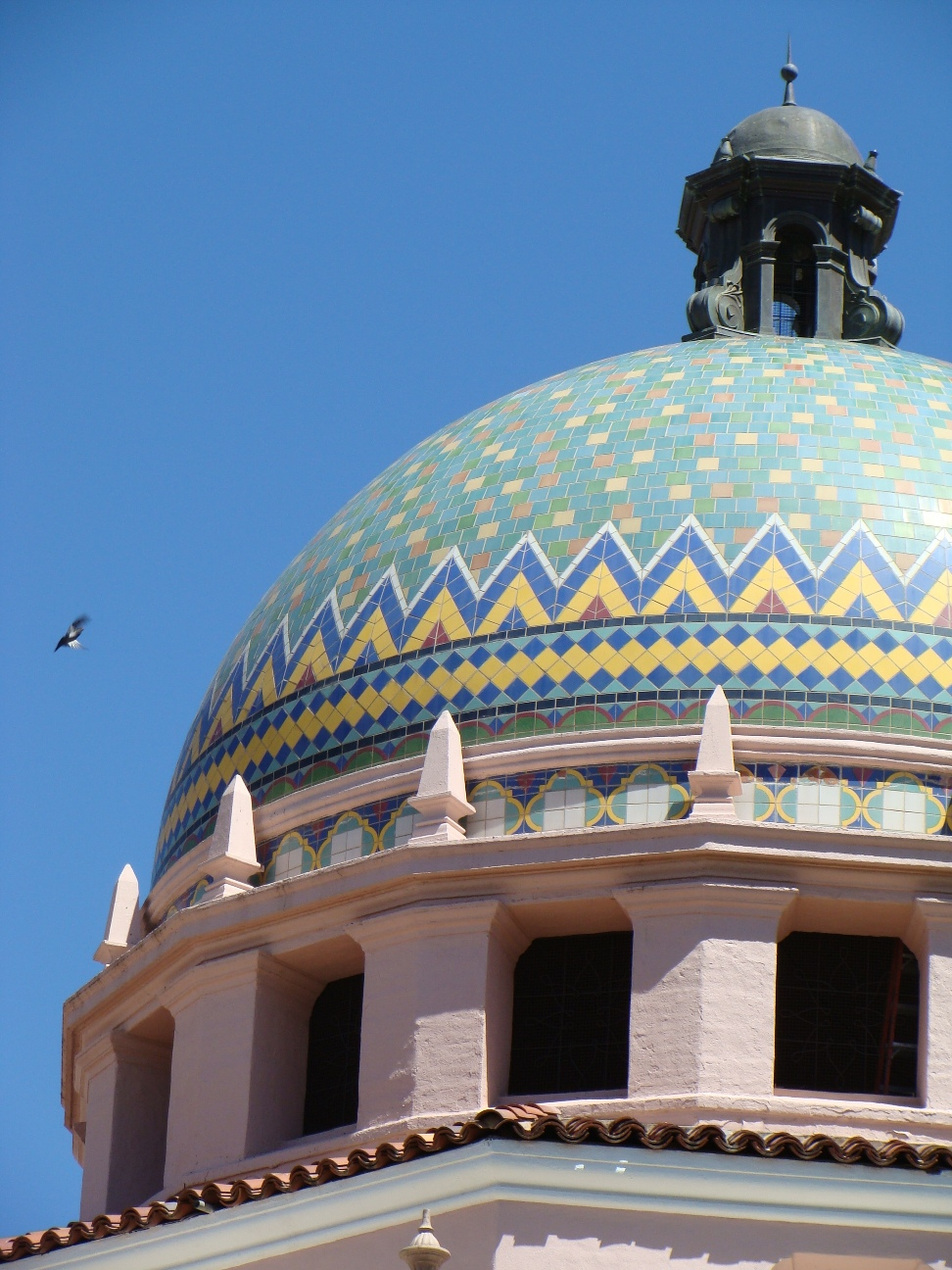
Tiled dome of courthouse

Pima County Courthouse is the former main county courthouse building in downtown Tucson, Arizona It is listed on the National Register of Historic Places. It was designed by Roy Place in 1928 in Mission Revival and Spanish Colonial Revival style architecture.

The building previously housed the Pima County Superior Court (1930–1977) and later, the Pima County Consolidated Justice Court (1977–2015), which handled lower-level state criminal matters and small claims cases. As of February 2015, court proceedings for Justice Court were held in a newer building shared with other Pima County departments, which is located at 240 North Stone Avenue. Superior Court proceedings were held in the Pima County Superior Court building, located at 110 West Congress Street.

As this building was projected to be vacant by 2017, as the various departments and court functions relocate to newer facilities, Pima County was, in 2015, planning to convert the historic Courthouse to museum space. The county was in discussions with the University of Arizona and the Tucson Museum of Art to house exhibits; there was to be a new café, and a memorial to the victims of the 2011 Tucson shooting that seriously wounded then-U.S. Representative Gabby Giffords.

In 2020 the University of Arizona Mineral Museum (UAMM), formerly located on the campus of the University of Arizona in Tucson, was in the process of moving its location to the Pima County Courthouse in downtown Tucson.

It currently is the home of the Southern Arizona Heritage & Visitor Center.
