= Tombstone Courthouse State Historic Park =

- Tombstone Courthouse
- U.S. National Register of Historic Places
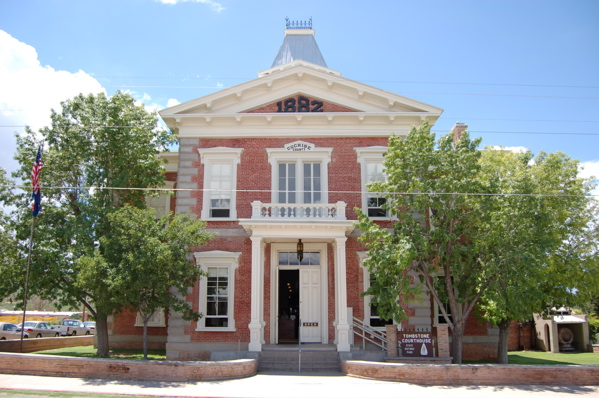
- Former Cochise County Courthouse, now site of Tombstone Courthouse State Historic Park

- Location within Arizona Location within the United States
- Location: Tombstone, Arizona
- Coordinates: 31°42′44″N 110°4′8″W
- Built: 1882
- Visitation: 40,105 (2022)
- NRHP reference No.: 72000196
- Added to NRHP: April 13, 1972

Tombstone Courthouse State Historic Park is a state park of Arizona in the United States. Located in Tombstone, the park preserves the original Cochise County courthouse. The two-story building, constructed in 1882 in the Victorian style, is laid out in the shape of a cross and once contained various county offices, including those of the sheriff, recorder, treasurer, and the Board of Supervisors as well as courtrooms and a jail. Inside, the courthouse contains a museum with numerous artifacts from the town's history while outside, a replica gallows has been constructed in the courtyard to mark the spot where seven men were hanged for various crimes. The park was one of the first to be designated as a state park and in 1959 was the first to open following the 1957 establishment of the Arizona State Parks Board.

== History ==
Following the 1877 discovery of silver ore by prospector Ed Schieffelin in southeastern Arizona, the town of Tombstone was founded and grew rapidly as miners flooded the area in the hope of finding their fortunes. The town of Tombstone was incorporated in 1879. By 1881 the town had grown to more than 7,000 population; stage robberies were no longer novel events. But more important than the lawlessness, Tombstone miners and merchants had to travel 150 dusty roundtrip miles to Tucson to record mining claims, deeds, contracts, etc. at the Pima County Courthouse. At the time, the area was part of Pima County with the county seat Tucson being a rugged two-day, 70-mile journey away. In 1881, as a result of these incentives, and aided by a shrewd agreement with the Prescott delegation to the Territorial Legislature, the residents of the thriving boomtown voted to separate from Pima County and the territorial legislature subsequently formed a new county, Cochise County. Cochise county was formed in 1881 from the eastern part of Pima County, and Tombstone became its seat (The Territorial Capital stayed at Prescott rather than moving to Tucson).

A new courthouse was built the following year and housed all of the county's offices. The Sheriff of Cochise County had his office on the ground floor, first door to the right, when the new courthouse was built in 1882. Sheriff John Behan and his successors gradually instilled the idea that the proper arena for conflict was the courtroom upstairs rather than the street. Except for the Earp–Clanton feud, which gave Tombstone an extremely bad press from which it has no interest in recovering, citizens gladly accepted the proffered alternative. The Tombstone courthouse represents a practical solution to the problem of securing lives and property in unorganized or poorly governed territory. It was put into effect quickly, without fumbling by men practiced in the process through their experience in Colorado, Utah, Nevada, where mining rushes had carried them in the past.

Tombstone remained the county seat until 1929, when outvoted by a growing Bisbee, and the county seat was moved there. The last county office left the courthouse in 1931. Except for an ill-fated attempt to convert the courthouse into a hotel during the 1940s, the building stood vacant until 1955. When the Tombstone Restoration Commission acquired it, they began the courthouse rehabilitation and the development as a historical museum that has continued to operate as a state park since 1959. It features exhibits and thousands of artifacts which tell of Tombstone's colorful past.

== Architecture ==
The courthouse in Tombstone is an example of Territorial Victorian, and such the building is a culmination of that tradition. When Maricopa County built its courthouse a few years later, they cribbed liberally from Tombstone's example. The Tombstone courthouse is the oldest courthouse still standing in Arizona, At the time it was built it was one of the largest buildings in Arizona Territory.

The building measures 76 feet in total width; the "shaft" of the cruciform structure measures 40 feet wide; the east and west wings project nineteen feet from the main structure and are 30 feet long. The first segment to be built is 88 feet long overall. The addition to the jail and courtroom brought the total to 116 feet in length. The building is a two-story red brick structure built with five courses of runners and one of headers. Exterior angles are quoined with white stone and/white stone "dripstone course" separates the lower and upper half of the building. A one-story cupola or observation tower with a mansard roof wears a lacy gingerbread cresting that creates a kind of "widow's walk" atop all. Fenestration is symmetrical. The double-hung eight-pane windows, are set in heavy frames topped by a bracketed, heavy "territorial" cornice that echoes the strongly accented pediments atop each end wall of the building. The eave-line is deeply recessed and strongly accented with simple dentils as are the pediments of the gable ends. This theme is repeated on a smaller scale on the cupola pediments. Elegantly slim chimneys once served every room but are now reduced to two. An iron spiral stair ascends the southeast corner to the courtroom. Formerly another arose from the jail below the courtroom directly to the prisoner's table. It replaced an elevator which proved unsatisfactory. The front entrance porch is carried by four square pillars, two free and two attached, all have a large groove on each face. It is topped by a balustrade. The porch cornice is dentated.

The main portion of the Tombstone Courthouse was built in 1882 at a cost of $50,000. An addition to the rear was built in 1904. The building served as Cochise County courthouse until 1929 when the county seat was moved to Bisbee. The courthouse was listed on the National Register of Historic Places in 1972.

== See also ==
- Gunfight at the O.K. Corral
- Bisbee Massacre
- Shootout at Wilson Ranch

== Gallery ==
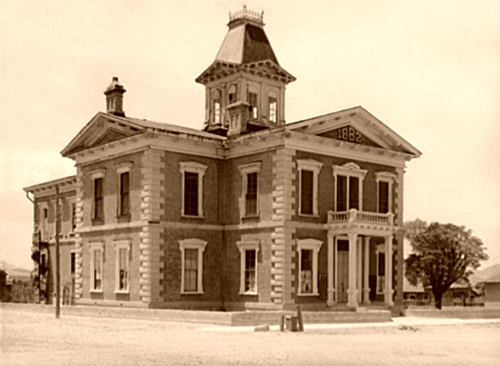
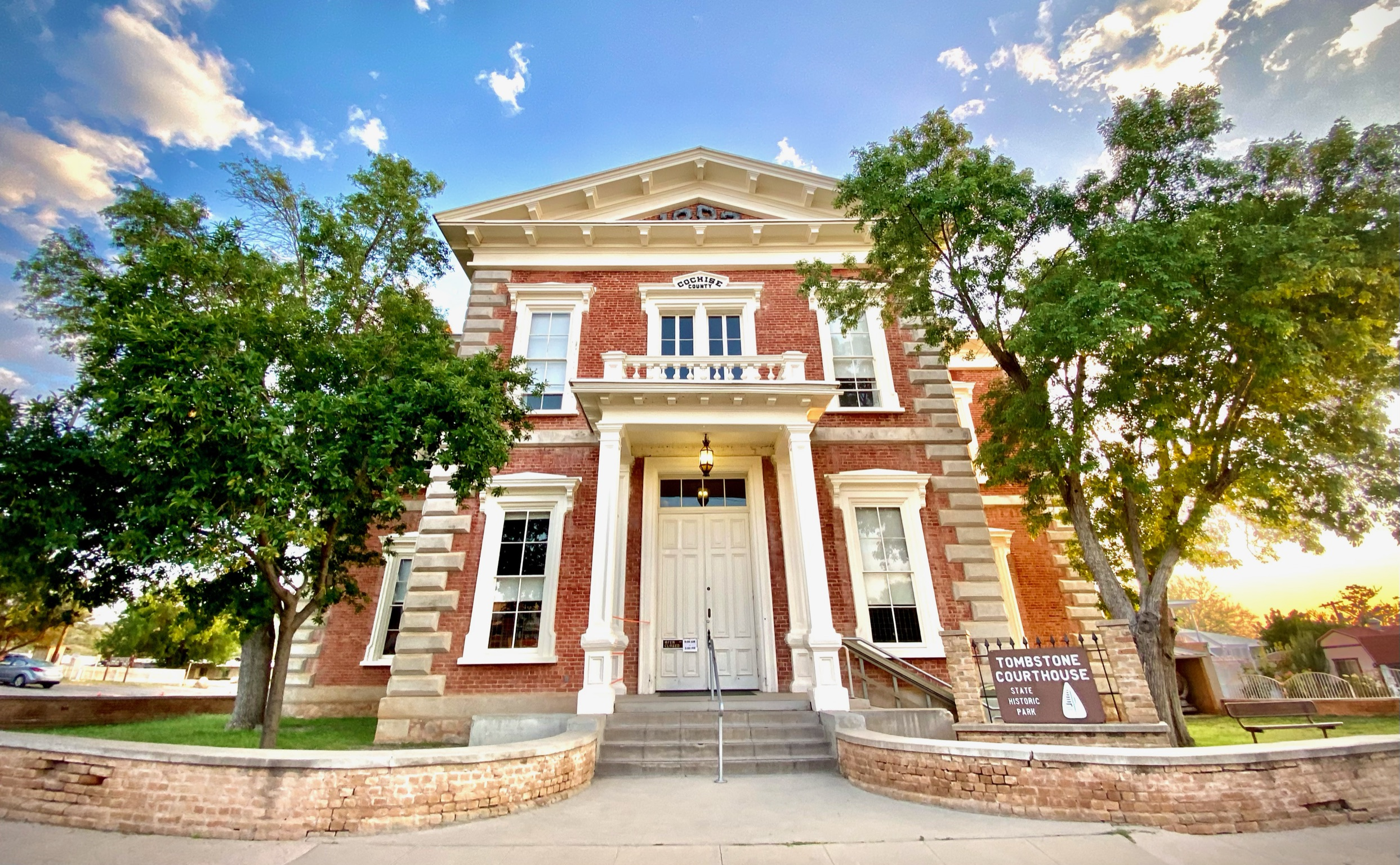
The front of the courthouse
Courthouse in 1940, prior to its conversion into a museum

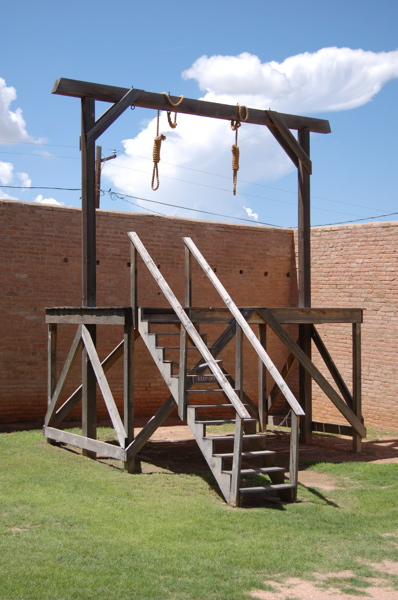
2007 Replica gallows

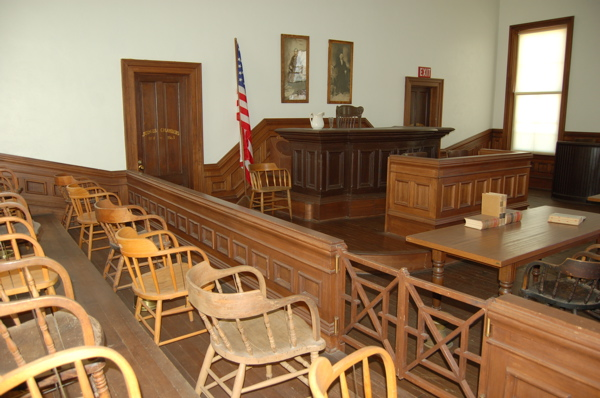
Courtroom

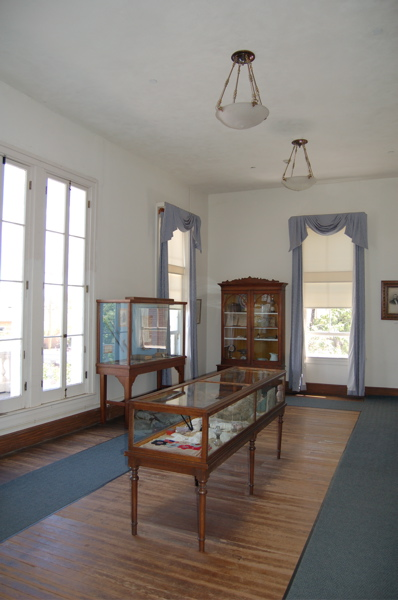
Judge's chambers and Clerk of the Court office

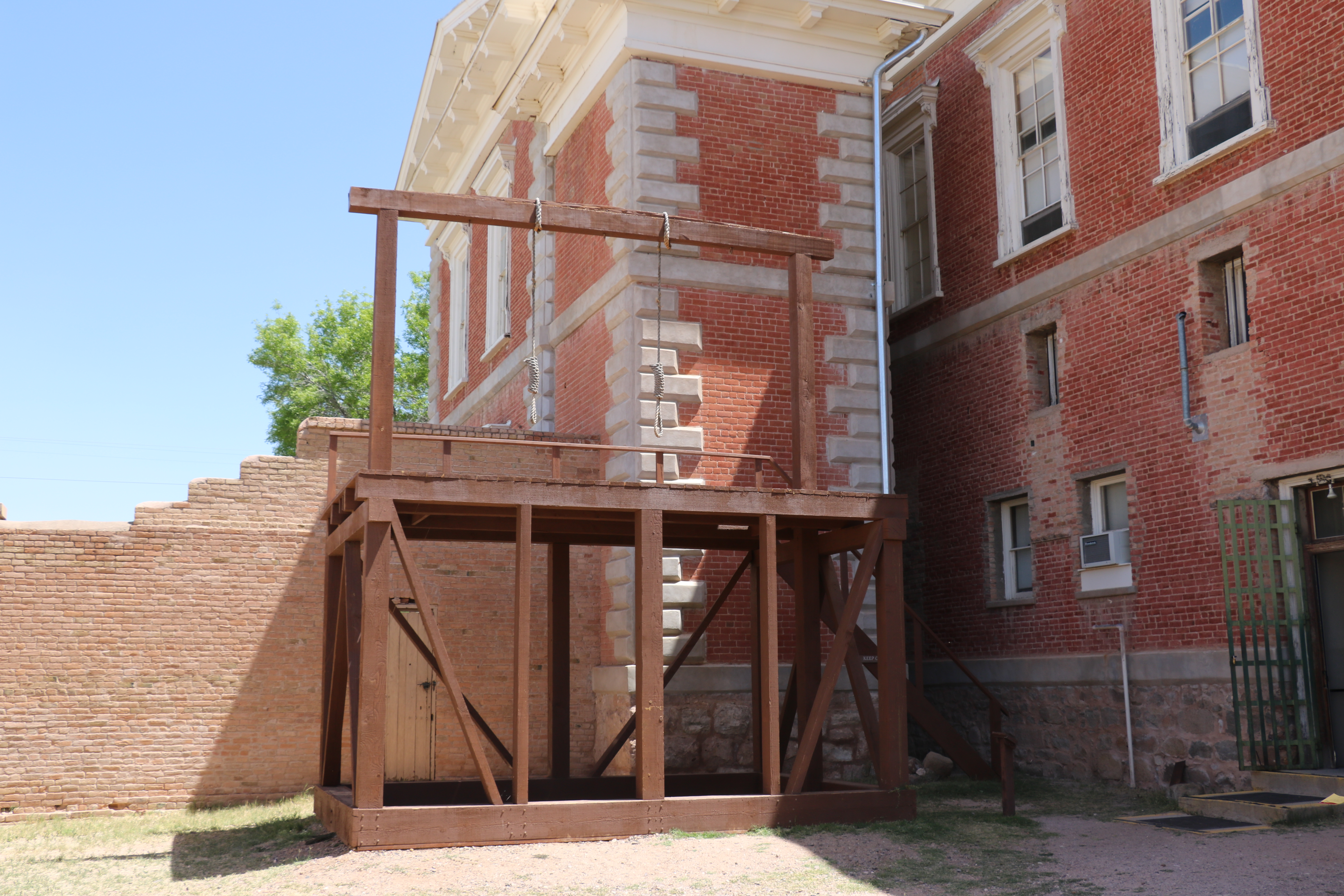
2017 replica gallows in original courtyard location

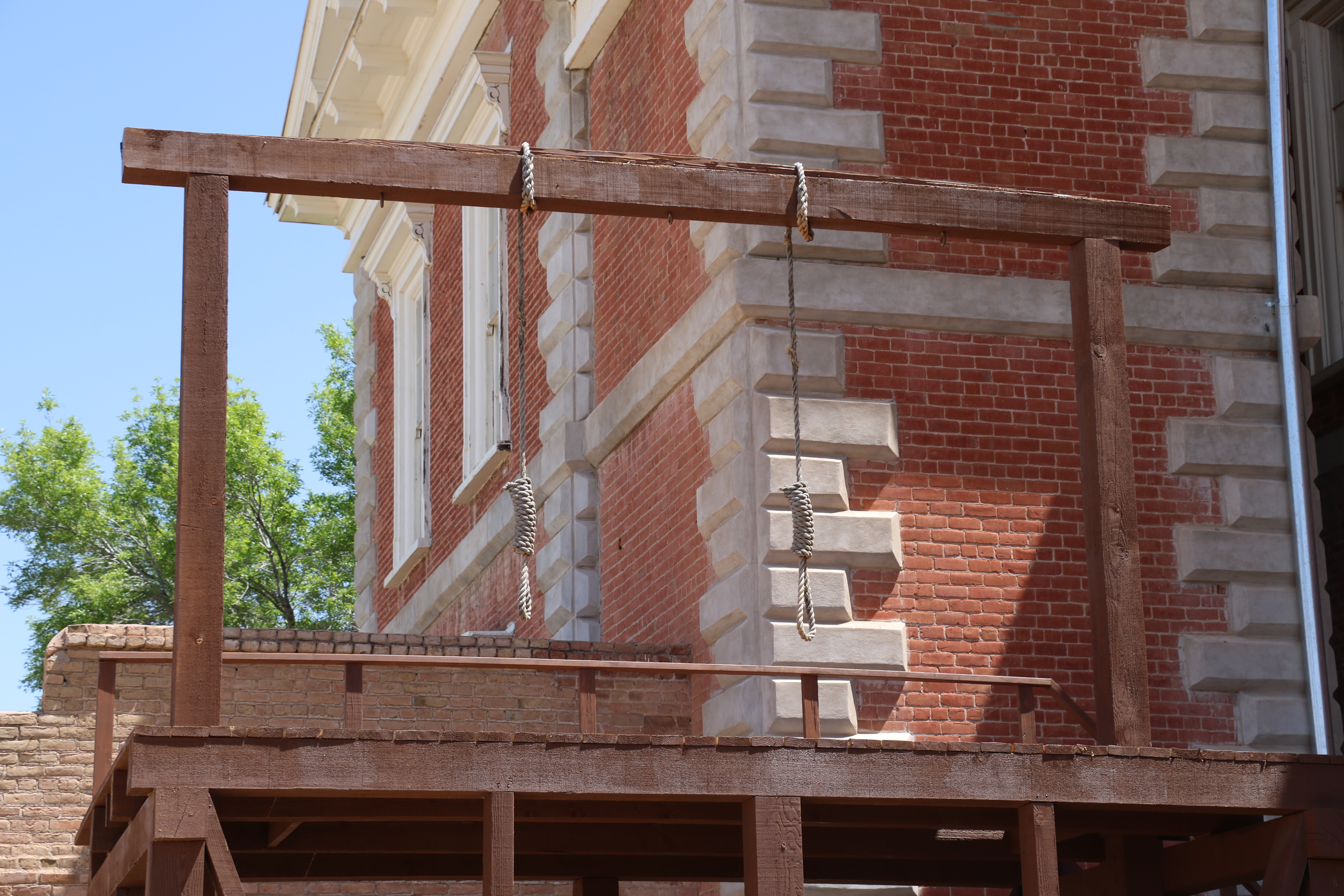
2017 replica gallows with two nooses, representing last use
