= Yuma County Courthouse =

- U.S. National Register of Historic Places
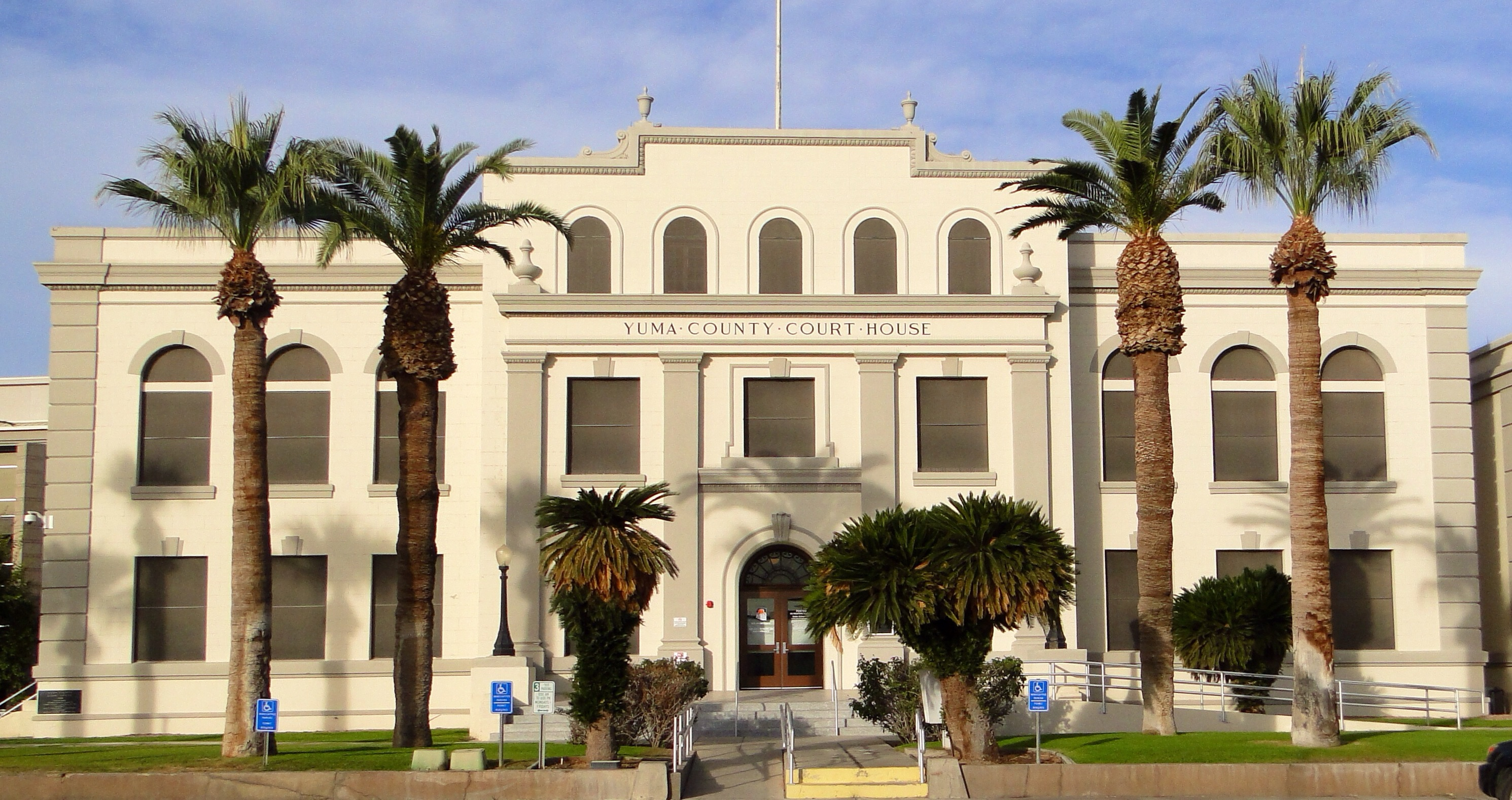
- The Yuma County Courthouse in 2014

- Location within Arizona
- Location: 168 South 2nd Avenue, Yuma, Arizona
- Coordinates: 32°43′26″N 114°37′18″W
- Area: 2 acres (0.81 ha)
- Built: 1928
- Architect: Ralph Swearingen & G. A. Hanssen
- Architectural style: Late 19th And 20th Century Revivals
- MPS: Yuma MRA
- NRHP reference No.: 82001661
- Added to NRHP: December 7, 1982

The Yuma County Courthouse is a historic building in Yuma, Arizona. It is the third building to serve as the courthouse of Yuma County, Arizona. It was built in 1928, and designed by Ralph Swearingen & G. A. Hanssen, two architects from San Diego, California. It has been listed on the National Register of Historic Places since December 7, 1982.
