= American Flag, Arizona =

- Ghost town
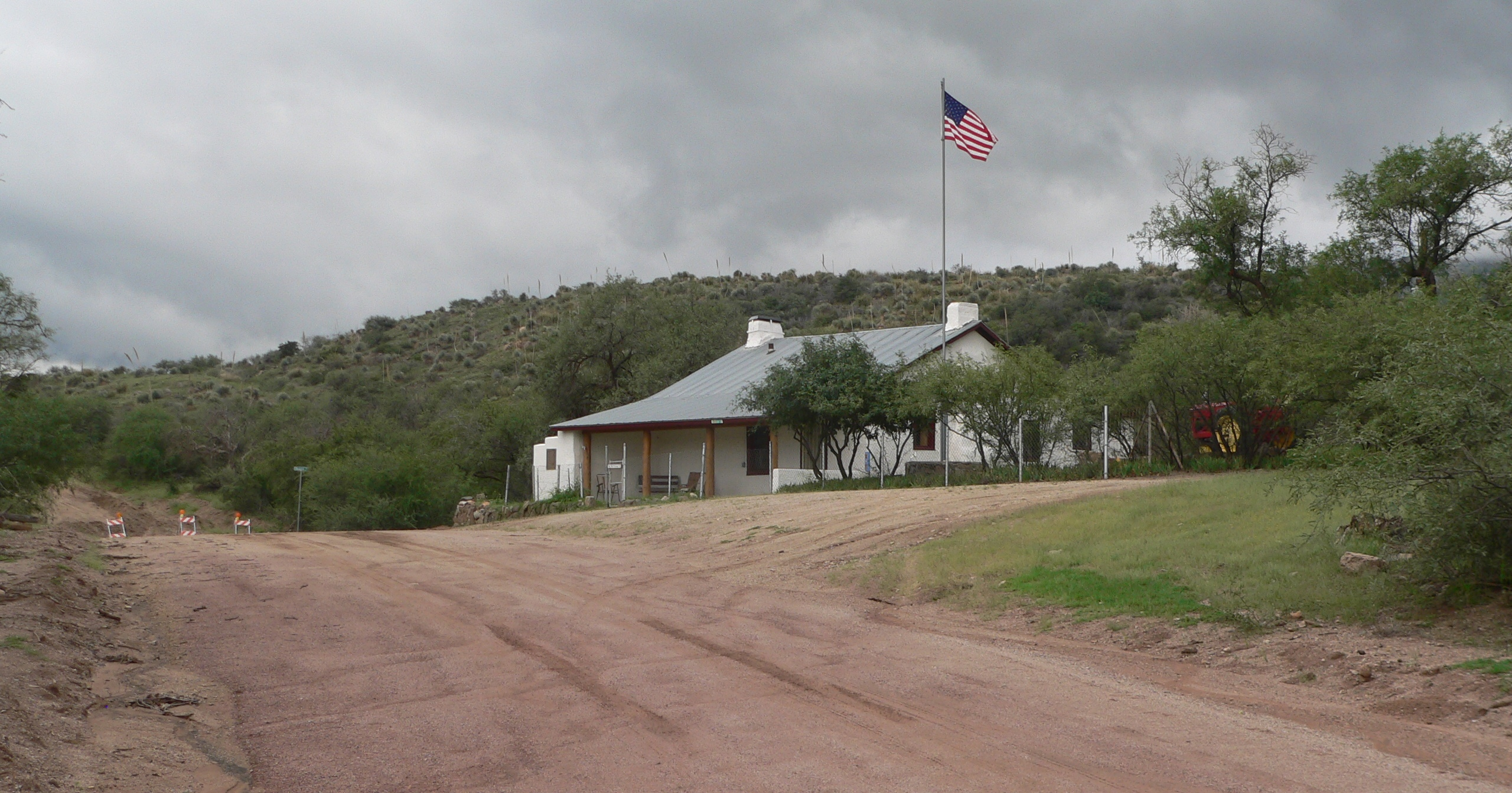
- American Flag post office

- Location within Arizona Location within the United States
- Coordinates: 32°34′48″N 110°43′13″W
- Country: United States
- State: Arizona
- County: Pinal
- Founded: circa 1870
- Abandoned: circa 1890
- Founder: Isaac Lorraine
- Named for: The American flag
- Elevation: 4,423 ft (1,348 m)

Population
  - Total: 0
- Time zone: UTC-7 (MST (no DST))
- Post Office Opened: December 28, 1880
- Post Office Closed: July 16, 1890

American Flag is a ghost town in Pinal County, Arizona, five miles (8.1 km) southeast of Oracle. The town was established in the late 1870s, but shortly after 1890, the town had become abandoned.

== History ==
American Flag was founded by prospector Isaac Lorraine as the American Flag mine and mining camp in the late 1870s. In 1881, the town was sold to the Richardson Mining Company of New York. The town was small and had a population of about forty, on average. Little is known about the mining camp at this time. Later, Lorraine built the American Flag Ranch as he left the mining business. By 1884, the population was only fifteen, so the post office closed a few years later and the town was left unoccupied.

The post office was moved to the American Flag Ranch headquarters in 1880. The building still stands, and is the oldest surviving territorial post office building in Arizona. The building is now on the National Register of Historic Places, and is preserved by the Oracle Historical Society.

== See also ==
- List of United States post offices
