= James A. Walsh United States Courthouse =

- U.S. Post Office and Courthouse
- U.S. National Register of Historic Places
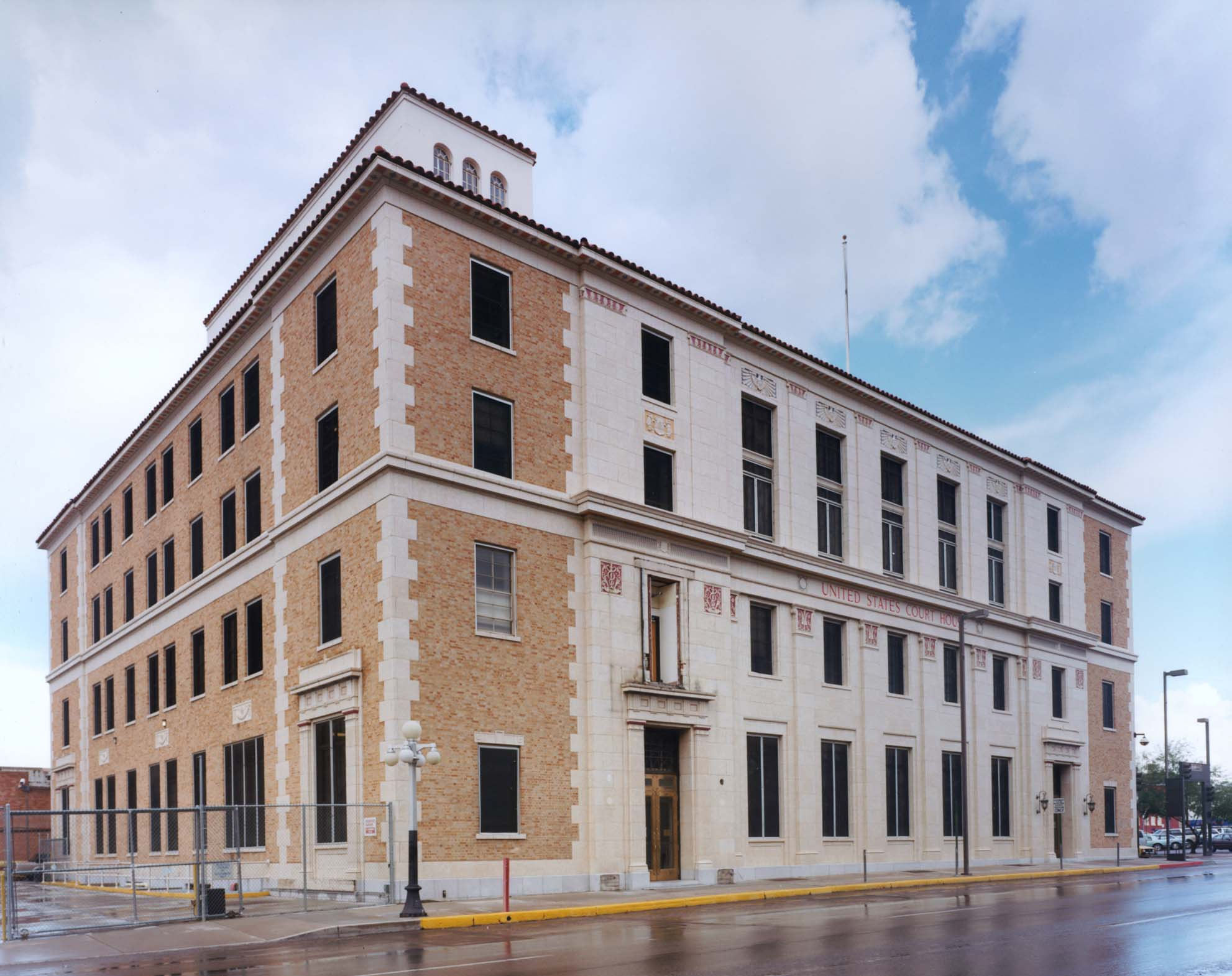
- James A. Walsh U.S. Courthouse, June 2003

- Location within Arizona Location within the United States
- Location: 55 E. Broadway, Tucson, Arizona
- Coordinates: 32°13′17″N 110°58′10″W
- Area: 0.6 acres (0.24 ha)
- Built: 1928
- Architectural style: Classical Revival
- NRHP reference No.: 83002995
- Added to NRHP: February 10, 1983

The James A. Walsh United States Courthouse, also or formerly named U.S. Post Office and Courthouse, is a historic post office and courthouse building located at Tucson at Pima County, Arizona. It was a courthouse of the United States District Court for the District of Arizona.

== Building history ==
The building was constructed during 1929-1930 as a U.S. Post Office and Courthouse. It was designed in 1928-1929 by the Office of the Supervising Architect under James A. Wetmore. Planning for the building began in 1910, when the U.S. House of Representatives approved a bill authorizing the purchase of a site for a new post office in Tucson. That was the same year that the statehood bill, discussed since Congress deemed Arizona worthy of statehood in 1888, finally passed the House of Representatives. Still, Arizona did not become a state until 1912. It would be another 20 years before the building was constructed.

When the Treasury Department failed to act, the city purchased the site recommended by the federal site agent who visited Tucson in 1911, and the city donated the property to the federal government. Delays continued because by this time Congress had instituted a moratorium on construction due to negative publicity surrounding the awarding of building contracts. In the interim, the federal government leased out the land and a gas station and other businesses occupied the parcel. Congress lifted the construction moratorium in 1926. The appropriation for design and construction of the building occurred in 1928.

Scheduled for completion in December 1930, the building was completed ahead of schedule, and opened for business on September 19, 1930. The post office operated in the building until 1974. The building was listed in the National Register of Historic Places in 1983 as "U.S. Post Office and Courthouse". In 1985, the United States Congress passed a bill renaming the building in honor of James Augustine Walsh, who served as a federal district judge from 1952 to 1981. For the first eighteen years of his tenure Walsh was the only judge in the U.S. District Court in Tucson.

The U.S. District Court moved out of the Walsh Courthouse in 2000 into the newly completed Evo A. DeConcini Courthouse in Tucson. In 2002, a remodeling project was begun in order to accommodate the U.S. Bankruptcy Court, which would be the new long-term tenant of the building. After the first phase of the project was completed, the Bankruptcy Court moved in and remained in the building during the second phase of construction, completed in 2008.

== Architecture ==
The building is a well-executed, well-preserved example of the Neoclassical architectural style. The building was designed in 1928-1929 by the Office of the Supervising Architect of the Treasury, then under the direction of Acting Supervising Architect James A. Wetmore. The Walsh building is a neoclassical arrangement modified by a Mission-style roof. The neoclassical style is characterized by symmetry of plan, frontal arrangement, monumental proportions, and flat, smooth or polished stone surfaces. The Treasury Department favored neoclassicism as the appropriate architectural style for most of the federal buildings constructed during this time period. However, the Mission-style variations on the building are used to moderate the rigid neoclassical lines while acknowledging the local building tradition.

The decoration of the building is understated, but the primary (south) facade of the building is the most elaborate in ornament and detail. It is lavishly finished with terracotta sheathing, which is contrasted by small amounts of brickwork in the two end bays. Two tiers of superimposed rows of pilasters dominate this facade. The entablature of the lower tier bears the words "United States Court House." Each level features six engaged columns with stylized Composite capitals. There are stylized eagles above each of the fourth floor windows, and other terracotta ornaments are visible on this facade. There are two large entry doors for the building, one at either end of this bay and each featuring a classical surround with a flat pediment. At either end of the central bay are brick-faced bays framed by terracotta quoins (corner elements). The other elevations are relatively unembellished, although the east front gained some significance when the main entry door was moved to this side in the recent remodeling project. The exterior exhibits a high degree of its original character, with only minimal alterations evident.

A post office originally occupied the first floor and remained there until 1974. When the post office moved out, the first floor post office workroom was remodeled for use as a courtroom, and the original main post office lobby was converted into a jury assembly room. The original skylight in the postal workroom was covered, and the lobby was broken up into smaller spaces. The recent renovation project restored the main lobby to its original open configuration and preserved many of its original elements and finishes, including the terracotta tiled, basketweave patterned floor, the plaster walls, the marble wainscots and floor borders, and the ceilings with molded plaster crowns. The former postal workroom now serves as an intake area for the Courts. The original postal workroom skylight was enclosed, but two new "belvedere" skylights, which allow natural light into the space but significantly reduce heat gain, were installed.

The second, third, and fourth stories consist of corridors around the light well, each of which contains a mixture of offices and courtroom spaces. The most significant interior space is the main courtroom, located on the southern side of the third and fourth floors. The space retains many of its original elements, including the wood-beamed ceiling with stenciled patterns, original wainscoting, plaster walls, and wooden window and door frames and surrounds. The historic courtroom was a primary focus of the second phase of the recent renovation project. Inappropriate non-historic light fixtures were replaced with more compatible fixtures, the stenciled ceiling received conservation treatment, and the judge's bench and jury box were reconfigured to meet the needs of the Bankruptcy Court. This building is the best-preserved example of Tucson's Depression-era architecture.

== History ==
- 1929-1930: Building constructed
- 1970s: Post Office moves out of building and first floor altered for other uses
- 1983: Listed in National Register of Historic Places
- 1985: Building renamed in honor of James A. Walsh
- 2000: U.S. District Court vacates building
- 2002: Major renovation project begun to accommodate U.S. Bankruptcy Court
- 2003: U.S. Bankruptcy Court moves into building
- 2008: Renovation project completed

== Building facts ==
- Location: 38 South Scott Avenue
- Architect: James A. Wetmore
- Construction Dates: 1929-1930
- Architectural Style: Neoclassical
- Landmark Status: Listed in National Register of Historic Places
- Primary Materials: Granite, brick, and terracotta
- Prominent Features: Terracotta tiles resembling limestone; Classical facade with terra-cotta ornamentation; Courtroom with wood-beamed ceiling and decorative accents

== See also ==
- List of United States post offices
