= Santa Cruz County Courthouse (Arizona) =

- U.S. National Register of Historic Places
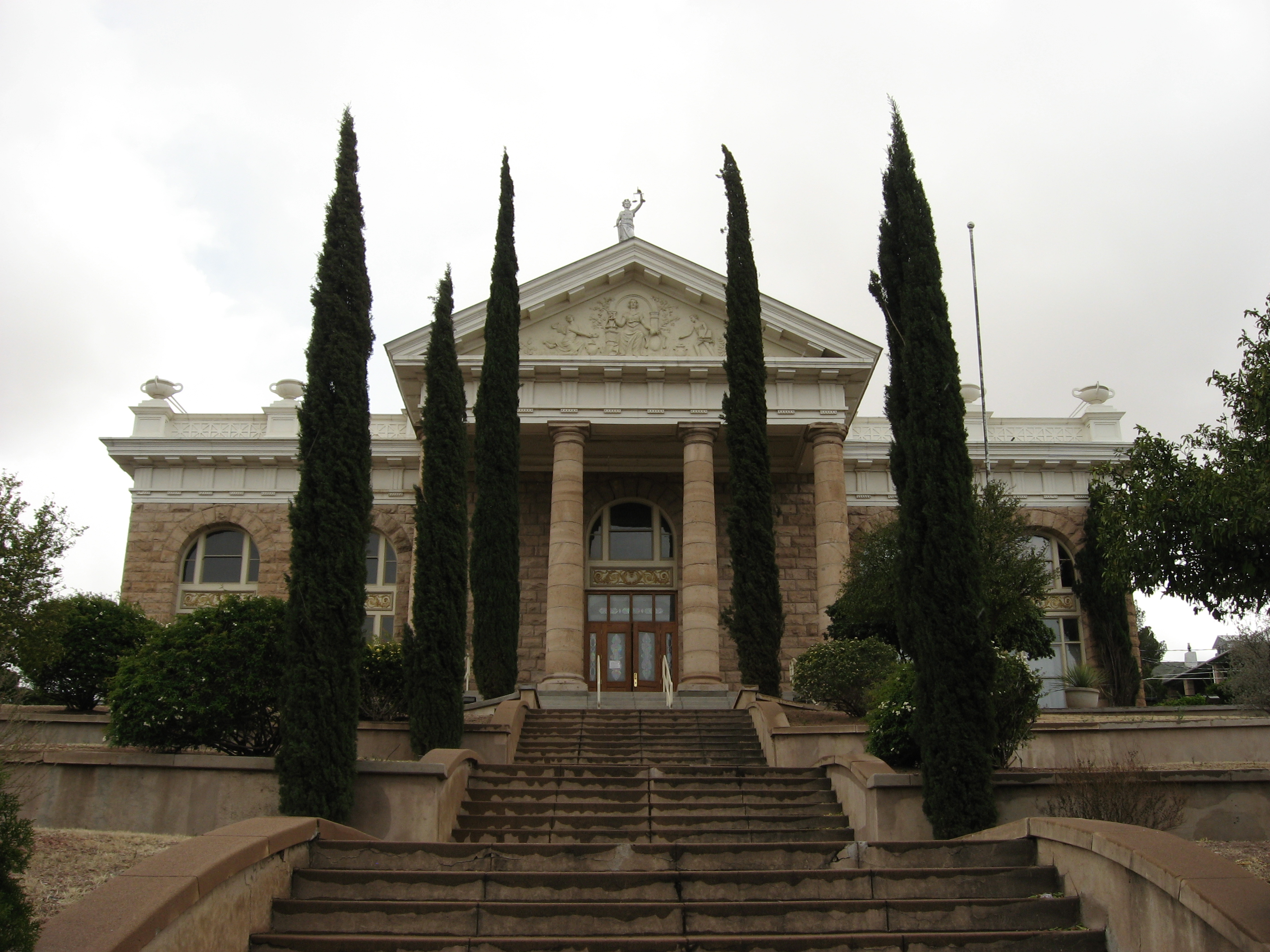
- Location: Court and Morley Sts., Nogales, Arizona
- Coordinates: 31°20′11″N 110°56′16″W
- Area: 1 acre (0.40 ha)
- Built: 1903
- Architect: Trost & Rust
- Architectural style: Classical Revival
- NRHP reference No.: 77000239
- Added to NRHP: December 7, 1977

The Santa Cruz County Courthouse in Nogales, Arizona was built in 1903. It is a Classical Revival style building. It was listed on the National Register of Historic Places in 1977.

It was designed by the El Paso, Texas based architectural firm of Trost & Rust.

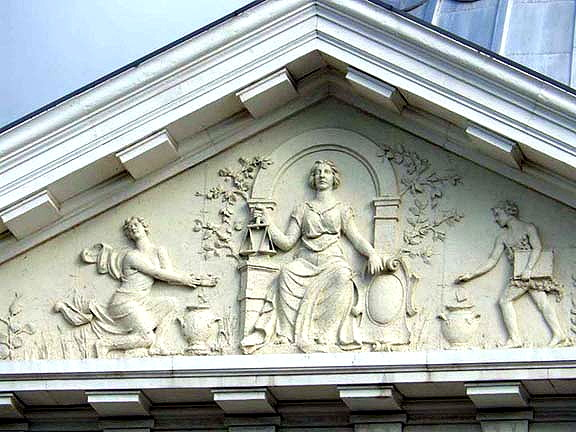
Lady Justice

It has a pedimental sculpture, depicting Justice.
