= United States Post Office and Courthouse–Prescott Main =

- US Post Office and Courthouse –Prescott Main
- U.S. National Register of Historic Places
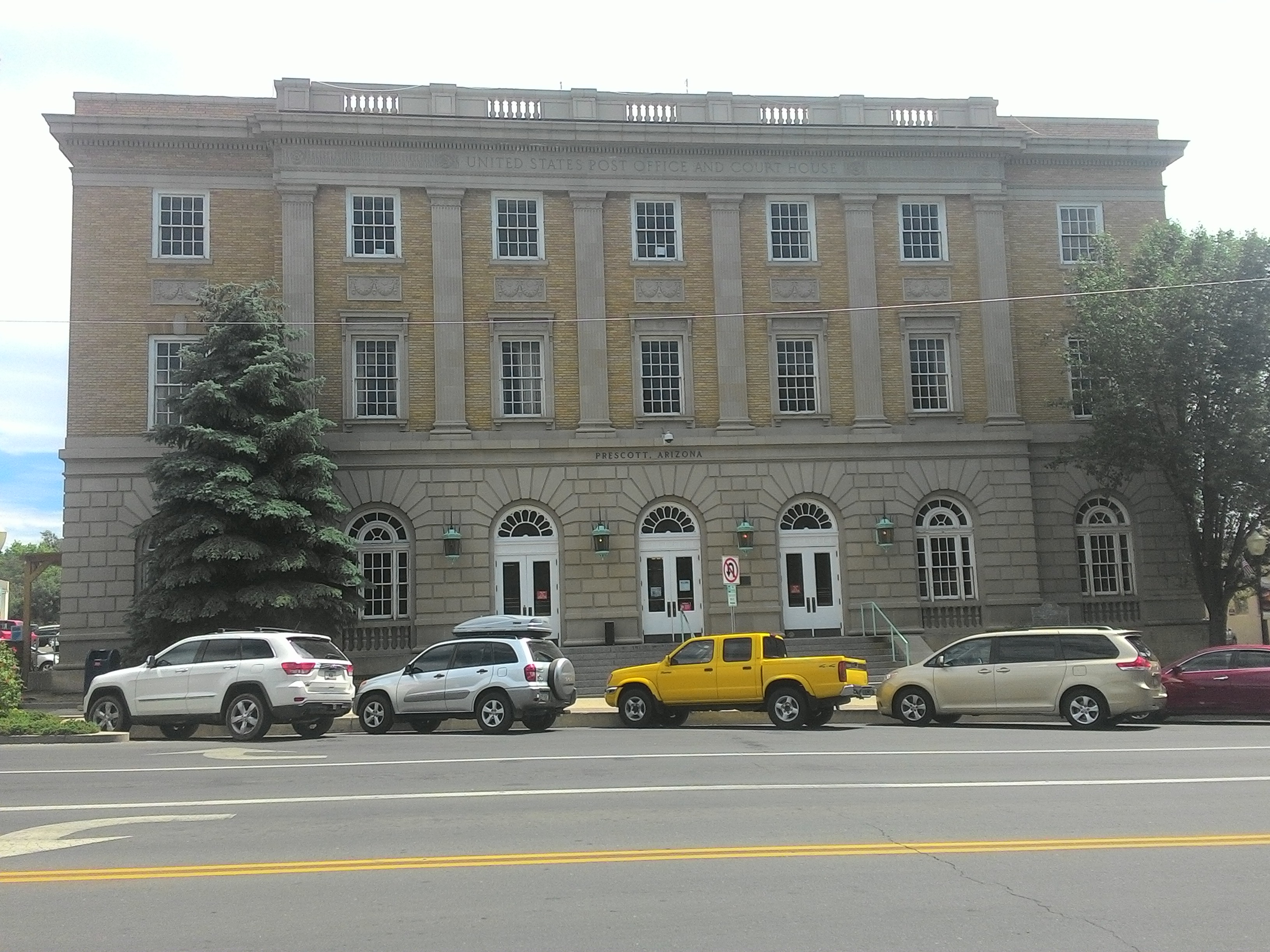
- Front View (Goodwin Ave)

- Location within Arizona Location within the United States
- Location: 101 W. Goodwin Ave., Prescott, Arizona
- Coordinates: 34°32′24″N 112°28′9″W
- Area: 0.4 acres (0.16 ha)
- Built: 1931
- Architect: Office of the Supervising Architect under James A. Wetmore; McKee, Robert
- Architectural style: Beaux Arts
- MPS: Historic US Post Offices in Arizona, 1900–1941, TR
- NRHP reference No.: 85003108
- Added to NRHP: December 03, 1985

The U.S. Post Office and Courthouse–Prescott Main, in Prescott, Arizona, was built in 1931. It was or is also known as Prescott Main Post Office and Courthouse and Prescott Main Post Office. It was listed on the National Register of Historic Places in 1985. It is a Beaux Arts architecture building and is NRHP-listed for its architecture.

The Post Office steps are made of porphyritic granite from Minnesota, containing large 1-inch phenocrysts of orthoclase feldspar. The original plans called for using local Prescott Granodiorite, as at the nearby Courthouse. The post office lobby is clad in fine veined Indiana marble. The side room in the northwest corner of the lobby has noteworthy wavy-texture marble.

== Gallery ==
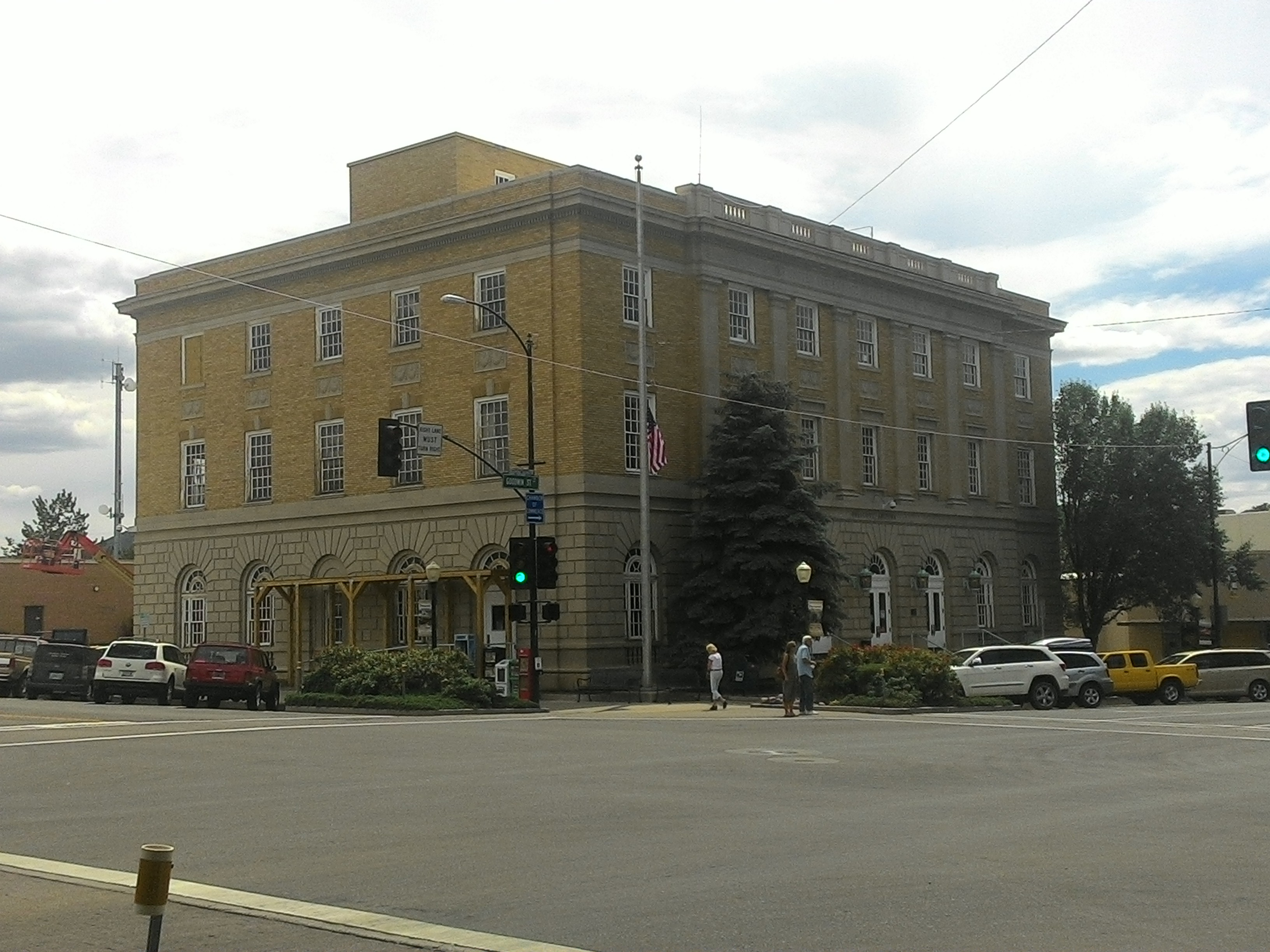
United States Post Office and Courthouse–Prescott Main NE corner view

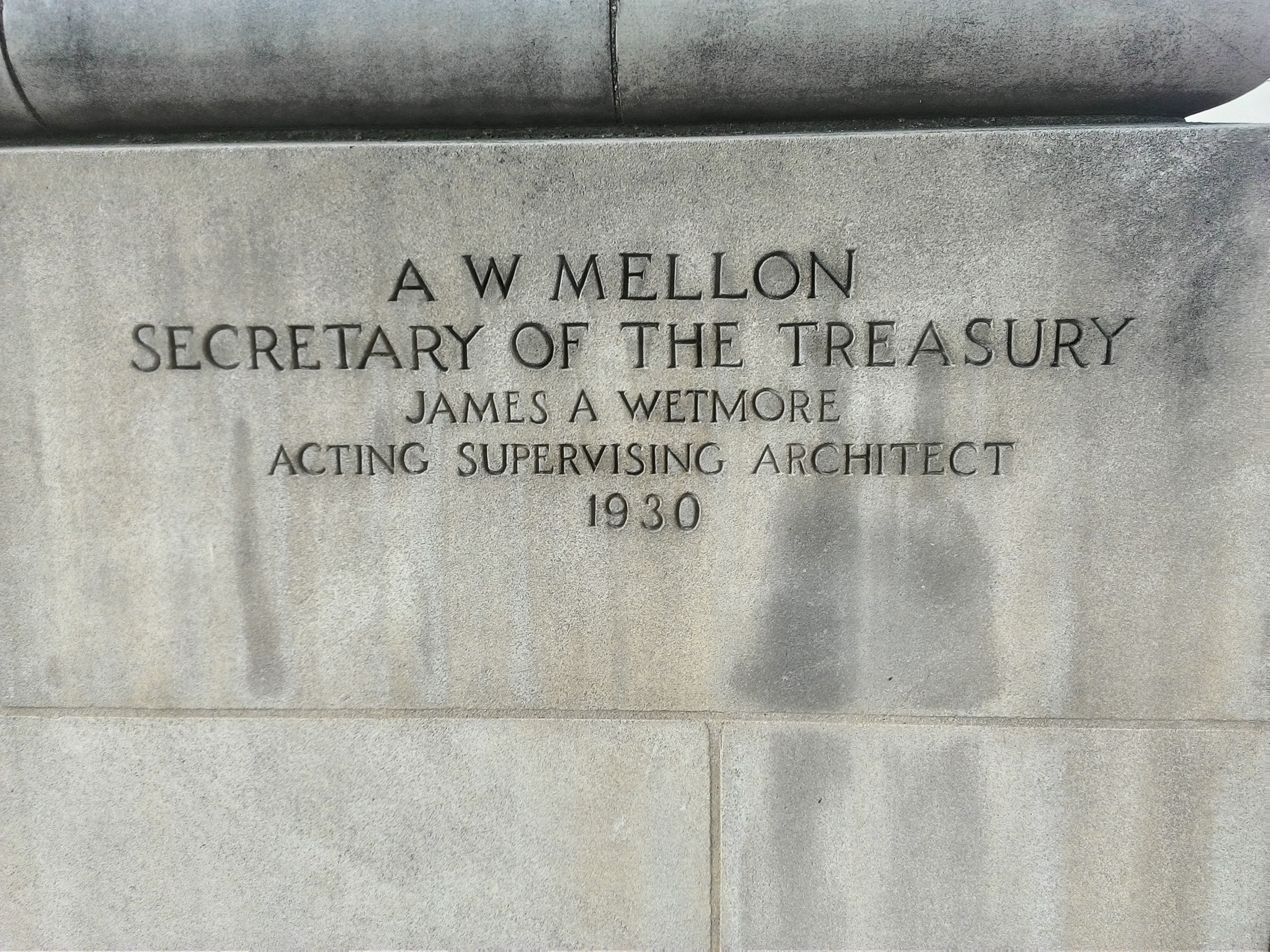
Cornerstone

== See also ==
- List of United States post offices
