= Roy Place =

American architect (1887–1950)

Roy W. Place
- Born: 1887; San Diego, California
- Died: 1950 (aged 62–63); Tucson, Arizona
- Occupation: Architect
- Practice: Lyman & Place; Roy Place; Place & Place

Roy Place (1887 – 1950) was a Tucson, Arizona architect.

Born in San Diego in 1887, Place moved to Tucson in 1917 after working in Chicago and the Boston firm of Shepley, Rutan & Coolidge. Place partnered with John Lyman in 1919, together constructing over 20 buildings in Tucson. Place worked independently from 1924 to 1940 as the University of Arizona's Chief architect. Roy's son, Lew Place, joined the firm in 1930, became a partner in Place and Place in 1940, and managed the firm after his father's death. Lew Place designed several University of Arizona buildings as well as Pueblo, Rincon and Salpointe High Schools. Lew was also the sculptor for the two figures on the Cochise County Courthouse.

Place's sophisticated Spanish Colonial Revival building shaped the character of Downtown Tucson from the mid-1920s until urban renewal of the late 1960s and early 1970s. Buildings included the Plaza Theater (constructed in 1930, closed and demolished on May 14, 1968, for the widening of Congress Street), the Montgomery Ward Building (striped and resurfaced on the corner of Pennington and Stone Avenue, under restoration in 2010) and The Pioneer Hotel (refaced and stripped of its ornamentation). The domed and pink plaster Pima County Courthouse is now listed on the National Register of Historic Places. The courthouse and the Davis Clinic Building are Place's only extant surviving examples of this architectural style in the downtown Tucson, but other examples abound around the city (see Extant Buildings, below).

The never realized ‘“Pueblo Nuevo Lodge”’ was designed by Roy Place and developer G.G. Souerbry. Conceived as a grand pueblo revival luxury 24-unit apartment Co-Op, the site occupied a Tucson city block on Speedway Boulevard from Martin to Warren. The elegant two-story design featured courtyards, pueblo massing and environmentally sensitive details. Each unit was conceived with a second story bedroom with two porches to maximize open air sleeping. The development was advertised as the “most beautiful and attractive ever constructed in Tucson” and was to feature: Philippine mahogany trim, colored stucco walls, steel casement windows, celotex insulation, bean ceilings, tile, oak and linoleum floors and kitchen servidors.

== Extant buildings ==
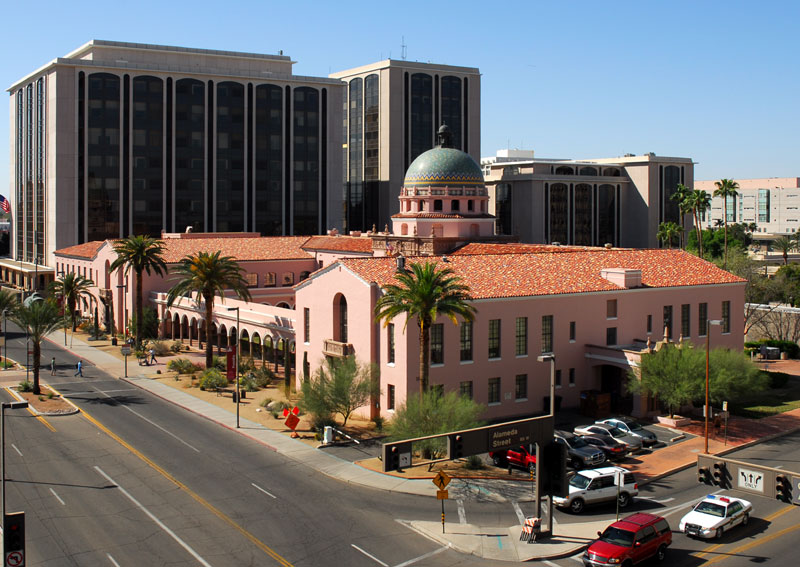
Pima County Courthouse, Tucson, 1929.

- Benedictine Sanctuary (1939–1940)
- The Pioneer Hotel (1928)
- Pima County Courthouse (1929)
- Veterans Administration Hospital in Tucson(1929)
- Former Montgomery Ward Building (1929)
- Roskruge School (1908)
- Sam Hughes Elementary School (1927)
- El Conquistador Water Tower (1929)
- Mansfeld Junior High School (1930)
- Reilly Funeral Home, remodel late 1920s/early 1930s, Pueblo Deco. Original architect Henry Jaastad
- Cochise County Courthouse in Bisbee (1930): An example of Pueblo Deco architecture.
- U.S. Post Office. Yuma, Arizona (1933): 370 West Third Street. Yuma, Arizona.
- Hotel Congress, remodel (1934), remodel of second story after fire destroyed second and third story. Third story never rebuilt. Original architect, Alexander Curlette (Los Angeles), 1919
- University of Arizona Humanities Building (1935)
- University of Arizona Anthropology Building (1935)
- University of Arizona Chemistry-Physics Building (1936)
- University of Arizona Centennial Hall (1936–1937)
- University of Arizona Gila Hall (1937)
- University of Arizona Steward Observatory (1922)
- University of Arizona Yuma Hall (1937)
- University of Arizona Administration Building (1937)
- Tucson Unified School District Educational Building (1941) 1010 East 10th Street; An example of Pueblo Revival architecture.
- Bank Building; 150 N. Stone Ave. (1955) Tucson, Arizona. (Lew Place as Roy passed in 1950.)
- Arizona School for the Deaf and Blind.
- Former Sears & Roebuck, 81 N. 6th Avenue (1929; remodel and north addition 1940, and 1947 south wing addition (existing)); An example of Art Deco. The 1940 north addition was demolished in 1984 for a parking lot structure.

Casa Grande High School (1920–21), East Florence Blvd., Casa Grande, Arizona

== Demolished buildings ==
- Plaza Theater (1930)

== Other sources ==
- Haldeman, Peter (October 2004). "Architectural Digest". Ronstatdt-linda.com.
- Nequette, Anne M.; Jeffery, R. Brooks (2002). A Guide to Tucson Architecture. University of Arizona Press.
- Cooper, James F. "The First Hundred Years: The History of Tucson School District 1, Tucson Arizona 1867-1967". Tusd.k12.az.us.
- Copper, James F. (1989). Places in the Sun. Tucson: Westernlore Press.
- The University of Arizona Comprehensive Campus Plan: Appendix 5 List of Historic Buildings: (PDF)
