= Mohave County Courthouse and Jail =

- U.S. National Register of Historic Places
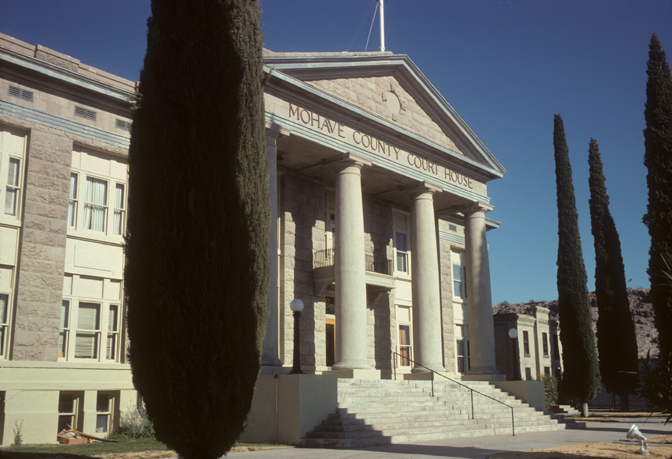

- Location within Arizona Location within the United States
- Location: 401 E. Spring St., Kingman, Mohave County, Arizona
- Coordinates: 35°11′31″N 114°3′7″W
- Built: 1909
- Built by: J. M. Wheeler
- Architect: Lescher & Kibbey (courthouse); Pauley Jail Co. (jail)
- Architectural style: Neoclassical
- MPS: Kingman MRA (AD)
- NRHP reference No.: 83002990
- Added to NRHP: August 25, 1983

The historic Mohave County Courthouse and Jail buildings on Spring Street at North 4th Street in Kingman, Mohave County, northwestern Arizona, were listed on the National Register of Historic Places in 1983.

The jail was built in 1909 and the adjacent courthouse was built in 1915.

== County courthouse ==
The courthouse was deemed "significant for its association with the national trend for construction of civic buildings in the Neo Classic style at the turn of the twentieth century. The World's Columbian Exposition in Chicago in 1893 formally promoted Neo Classic design as a statement of the country's democratic ideals and set a national precedent for Neo Classic architecture. The Neo Classic design of the Mohave County Courthouse embodies this ideology and expresses the nationalistic desire of the county. The projection of these ideals was particularly timely and relevant in Arizona, which had achieved statehood status only two years before."

The county courthouse was built in 1915, also in the Neoclassical style, and was designed by the architectural firm Lescher & Kibbey based in Phoenix. J. M. Wheeler, and Collamore & Sons from Arkansas, were the contractors. The court house was built with native cut stone from the Metcalfe Quarry.

The court house was used by the Mohave County government for 70 years.

== Historic jail ==
The jail, adjacent and to the east of the courthouse, was built in 1909–10 in the Neoclassical style. It is a two-story building about 35 by 25 feet (10.7 m × 7.6 m) in plan with a corbelled cornice. The Pauley Jail Co. provided the design and John Mulligan was the contractor. The new jail replaced the old jail, because the prisoners were breaking out too easily.

In 1984 the 1909 jail building was used as a county offices building.

In 2022 the building still exists, facing south, nestled between the courthouse and the much larger Mohave County Superior Court building.

A more modern and much larger jail, now considered the "Old Mohave County jail", was later built across Pine Street behind the courthouse and historic jail. In 2023, that jail building on Pine Street was slated to be demolished to make way for a new county justice center.

The jail serving the county in 2023, at 501 Historic Route 66 in Kingman, was built in 2010. It is a 688 bed county jail, about a half mile from the courthouse and 1909 jail.

Both buildings were added to the National Register of Historic Places in 1983.

== See also ==
- National Register of Historic Places listings in Mohave County, Arizona
- Yule marble
