= Neatsville, Kentucky =

Unincorporated community in Kentucky, US

Neatsville
- Unincorporated community
- Location within the state of Kentucky Neatsville (the United States)
- Coordinates: 37°11′50″N 85°7′32″W
- Country: United States
- State: Kentucky
- County: Adair
- Elevation: 705 ft (215 m)
- Time zone: UTC-6 (Central (CST))
  - Summer (DST): UTC-5 (CDT)
- ZIP code: 42728
- GNIS feature ID: 508677

Neatsville is an unincorporated community in Adair County, located in the U.S. state of Kentucky. It is located at the junction of Kentucky Route 206 and Kentucky Route 76. Its elevation is 705 feet (215 m). For unknown reasons, the town's name was spelled as Neetsville from 1876 until 1886, when the town's post office closed. In its early history from around the 1810s to 1900, Neatsville progressively grew to become a well-established, incorporated town. It has been relocated twice through the years, once due to flooding c. 1900 – c. 1902, which destroyed much of the town, and once in the 1960s when the Green River was impounded to make way for the Green River Reservoir State Park.

== Geography ==
Located in the north-east of Adair County, nearby communities are Eunice in the south, Pellyton in the north-east and Dunbar Hill in the north west.

== History ==
Various sources and accounts have referred to Neatsville as a village, a postal village, a hamlet, or as a town throughout its history. (Note: "The command took a roundabout road before getting to Neatsville. We came on a much nearer and better road. {Neatsville is a small village of not much importance.}")

The Neat family settled the community in the early 1800s, with Rudolf Neat the first to acquire land there. As it expanded, the community grew to encompass several stores, a hotel, a doctor's office, mills, a sawmill, distilleries, a saloon, a salt works, a cooper shop, a carding machine, and a Masonic Lodge. (Note: "An act to incorporate Neatsville Lodge, No. 192, of Free and Accepted Masons.")

It was incorporated as a town on February 23, 1847. Its post office was established on March 13, 1844, and closed in 1886. In 1848 the town's population was estimated to be around 50, and in 1876 the town's population was estimated at 60. The Masonic Lodge was relocated to Pellyton in 1917.

=== Relocations ===
Between 1901 and 1902, a major flood devastated the town, forcing its relocation from the north bank to the south bank of the Green River. At that time, the former location was abandoned. Erosion had occurred in the foundations of the buildings in the former location due to the flooding. A 1916 local account of the town's former site after the flooding characterized it as "nearly obliterated" and "in ruins".

Neatsville was later relocated to its present location sometime in the 1960s, when the Green River was impounded to enable the creation of the Green River Reservoir.
