= USS Yuma =

USS Yuma has been the name of five ships of the United States Navy. The name is taken after the Yuma tribe of Arizona.

- USS Yuma (1865) was a river monitor launched in May 1865, but never commissioned, and sold in 1874
- USS Yuma (YT-37) was a tug originally named USS Asher J. Hudson and later renamed Yuma; she was sold in 1921
- USS Yuma (AT-94) was a Navajo-class fleet tug commissioned in 1943, decommissioned and redesignated USNS Yuma (T-ATF-94) in 1958, and transferred to Pakistan in 1959

Other ships named Yuma operated by the United States include:

- Yuma (YTM-748) was a Chicopee-class medium harbor tug the Navy acquired in 1964 from the US Army, where she had served with the designation LT-2078 since 1954; she was placed out of service in 1976 and sold into commercial service in 1987
- USNS Yuma (T-EPF-8) is a Spearhead-class expeditionary fast transport

== See also ==
- USNS Yuma
- Yuma (disambiguation)
