= Yuma =

Yuma can refer to:

== Places ==
=== United States ===
- Yuma County, Arizona
  - Yuma, Arizona
  - Marine Corps Air Station Yuma
  - Yuma Proving Ground
  - Yuma Proving Ground, Arizona (CDP)
  - Yuma Territorial Prison
- Fort Yuma, California
- Yuma County, Colorado
  - Yuma, Colorado
- Yuma, Kansas
- Yuma, Kentucky
- Yuma, Michigan, in Springville Township
- Yuma, Tennessee

=== Elsewhere ===
- Yuma Desert, desert in southwest U.S. and northwest Mexico
- Long Island, Bahamas, called Yuma by Native Arawak Indians over 500 years ago
- The Magdalena River, Colombia, also known as the Yuma River
- La Yuma / el Yuma, approbative name for the United States in Cuba
- Yuma River (Dominican Republic)

== People ==
- Quechan, also called Yuma, a native people of Arizona
- Juma people, a native people of Brazil
- Suma Indians (Suma also spelled Yuma), a native people of Texas and Chihuahua, Mexico
- Yuma (name), a Japanese given name

== Arts and entertainment ==
- Yuma (1971 film), TV film starring Clint Walker
- Yuma (2012 film), Polish film

== Others ==
- USS Yuma, name of a number of U.S. Navy ships
- USNS Yuma, auxiliary ships of the U.S. Navy
- Yuma point, also called an Eden point, type of Paleo-Indian stone projectile point, first found in Yuma County, Colorado
- Yuma War, armed conflict fought primarily between the United States and the Yuma people
- Yuma (moth), genus of moths in the subfamily Epipaschiinae

== See also ==
- Yoma
- 3:10 to Yuma (disambiguation)
