= USNS Yuma =

USNS Yuma is the name of the following ships:

- USNS Yuma (T-ATF-94), formerly USS Yuma (AT-94), a Navajo-class tugboat loaned to Pakistan in 1959
- USNS Yuma (T-EPF-8), a Spearhead-class expeditionary fast transport launched in 2016

== See also ==
- USS Yuma, several commissioned ships of the U.S. Navy
- Yuma (disambiguation)
- Yuma (YTM-748)
