= Garlin (disambiguation) =

Garlin is a commune in France

Garlin may also refer to:

- Garlin, Kentucky, a town in the United States
- Garlin (surname)
- Garlin Murl Conner (1919-1998), United States Army officer
