= Tornado outbreak of January 2, 2006 =

Weather event in the United States

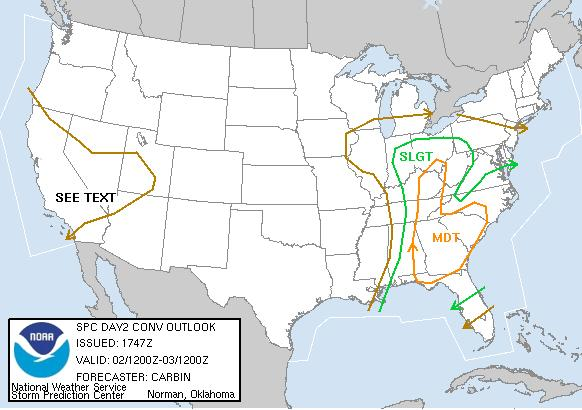
- Outlook on January 2, 2006

Meteorological history
- Duration: December 31, 2005 – January 2, 2006

Tornado outbreak
- Tornadoes: 20 confirmed
- Max. rating: F3 tornado
- Duration: 3 days, 7 hours
- Highest winds: 275 mph (443 km/h)
- Largest hail: 0.75 inches (1.9 cm)

Overall effects
- Casualties: 1 non-tornadic fatality, 5 tornadic injuries
- Damage: $7.4 million (2006 USD)
- Areas affected: Central and Southern United States

The tornado outbreak of January 1–2, 2006 was one of the largest tornado outbreaks ever recorded in the month of January. The outbreak affected much of the Central and Southern United States and produced 20 tornadoes. The tornadoes caused considerable damage in the states of Kentucky and Georgia. There were no tornado related fatalities and only minor injuries were reported.

== Storm history ==
A low pressure system crossed over the Central United States and a short wave trough was forming over Texas, contributing to record warmth on January 1 and 2 in the lower Ohio Valley and southern United States. Areas from Missouri to Indiana reported temperatures reaching from the high 60s°F to mid 70s°F.

On December 31, 2005, at 0600 UTC, in its day 1 forecast for January 1, 2006, the Storm Prediction Center issued in a slight risk of severe storms for the United States Gulf Coast and Ohio Valley as scattered to numerous thunderstorms were forecast to form over Alabama and Florida Panhandle. At 1300 UTC, the SPC extended the slight risk for severe weather as the trough shifted eastward across the Mississippi River Valley and the southern Jet stream combined with increasing moisture shifting across the U.S. Gulf Coast and Southeastern United States. On January 1, 2006, the SPC then issued a moderate risk of severe weather for much of the Southeastern United States and extended the slight risk of severe weather for the Ohio Valley and West Virginia and Pennsylvania as a strong area of low pressure with a trailing cold front moves across South Carolina. The National Weather Service forecast that the combination of warm air and the low will bring thunderstorms, damaging hail and tornadoes across Georgia and South Carolina.

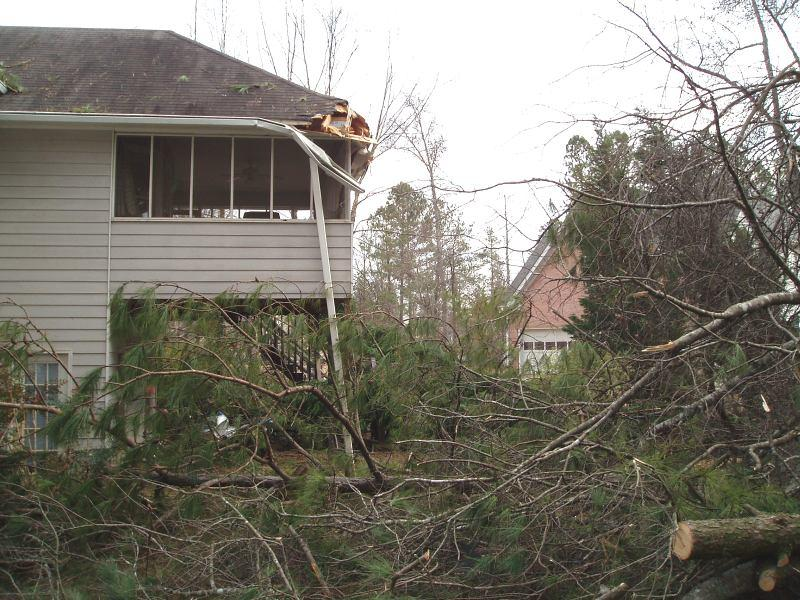
Tornado damage in Henry County.

On January 2, the SPC NEXRAD detected a convective band of thunderstorms forming over southeastern Georgia and northern Florida. The SPC issued in its outlook that southeastern Alabama, Florida Panhandle, Georgia and South Carolina could experience severe thunderstorms, hail and tornadoes. At 12:17 PM (EST), the National Weather Service issued a severe thunderstorm warning for Tattnall County in southeastern Georgia as the NEXRAD weather radar detected a line of severe thunderstorms producing hail and winds up to 60 mph. Another severe thunderstorm warning was issued at 1:07 (EST) for Effingham County and Bulloch County. At 1:23 PM (EST), the National Weather Service issued a tornado watch for southeastern Georgia and southeastern South Carolina. The National Weather Service then issued a tornado warning for Effingham and Chatham counties. After that, the thunderstorms continued to produce hail and high winds across much of Georgia and South Carolina, causing the NWS to issue more severe thunderstorm warnings and another tornado watch until 11:30 PM (EST). Elsewhere, thunderstorms also spawned numerous reports of tornadoes, hail and high winds in Kentucky, Indiana. Overall there were 19 confirmed tornadoes across the Southeastern United States.

== Confirmed tornadoes ==
Confirmed tornadoes by Fujita rating
FU	F0	F1	F2	F3	F4	F5	Total
0	6	9	4	1	0	0	20

=== January 1 event ===
List of reported tornadoes - Sunday, January 1, 2006
F#	Location	County	Coord.	Time (UTC)	Path length	Damage
Mississippi
F1	S of Spring Cottage	Marion	31.05°N 89.75°W	1525	1 mile (1.6 km)	50 ft wide tornado caused $10,000 (2006 USD) in damage.

=== January 2 event ===
List of reported tornadoes - Monday, January 2, 2006
F#	Location	County	Coord.	Time (UTC)	Path length	Damage
Missouri
F0	W of Chesterfield	St. Charles	38.68°N 90.92°W	0300	0.5 miles (0.8 km)	Brief touch down, no damage.
F0	W of Corridon	Reynolds	37.38°N 91.1°W	0445	0.5 miles (0.8 km)	Brief touchdown, no damage.
F1	W of St. Louis	St. Louis	38.67°N 90.42°W	0525	0.5 miles (0.8 km)	Brief touchdown, no damage.
Illinois
F1	S of Oconne	Shelby	39.27°N 89.12°W	2248	0.1 miles (0.2 km)	Tornado destroyed barn and blew down a few tree limbs. Damage from the tornado amounted to $15,000 (2006 USD).
Florida
F0	Sumatra	Liberty	30.02°N 84.98°W	1155	0.2 miles (0.3 km)	Tornado damaged unoccupied trailer and powerlines causing $10,000 (2006 USD) in damage.
Kentucky
F2	SW of Elizabethtown	Hardin	37.67°N 85.97°W	1343	8.4 miles (13.5 km)	
F1	E of Tanner	Laure	37.45°N 85.87°W	1350	6.4 miles (10.3 km)	
F1	SW of Louisville	Jefferson	38.22°N 85.83°W	1422	1.5 miles (2.4 km)	
F2	NE of Columbia	Adair	37.1°N 85.28°W	1422	0.6 miles (1.0 km)	
F1	N of Pellyton	Adair	37.22°N 85.08°W	1457	0.1 miles (0.2 km)	
F2	SW of New Salem	Lincoln	37.4°N 84.77°W	1534	8.7 miles (14.0 km)	
Georgia
F2	SW of Atlanta, Georgia	Fulton, Fayette	33.52°N 84.67°W	1545	7 miles (11.3 km)	
F3	S of Hollonville	Pike	33.15°N 84.45°W	1612	3 miles (4.8 km)	
F0	SE of Liberty Hill	Lamar	33.15°N 84.13°W	1644	0.2 miles (0.3 km)	
F1	NE of Flippen	Henry	33.5°N 84.15°W	1648	0.6 miles (1.0 km)	
F1	NW of Wayside	Jones	33.07°N 83.62°W	1735	3 miles (4.8 km)	
F1	N of Kite	Johnson, Emanuel	32.75°N 82.52°W	1922	12 miles (19.3 km)	
F0	SE of Four Points	Jenkins County, Georgia	32.65°N 81.93°W	2015	0.1 miles (0.2 km)	

=== Central Kentucky tornadoes ===
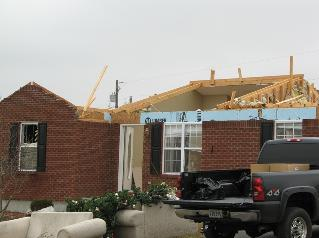
Tornado damage in Adair County, Kentucky.

The severe weather entered central Kentucky in the afternoon of January 2. At 2:30 pm (EST), a supercell thunderstorm formed over western Hardin County, Kentucky and intensified as it approached the town of Cecilia. At 2:45 pm, the storm produced a 100-yard-wide tornado that touched down northwest of Cecilia. The F2 tornado damaged multiple homes, sheds, trees, and other structures before dissipating near Fort Knox at 2:58 pm. Damage from the tornado amounted to $2 million (2006 USD). At 2:45 pm, another thunderstorm formed in northwestern Hart County and crossed Interstate 65 and into LaRue County. At 2:50 pm, the storm spawned an F1 tornado that touched down near Talley. During its broken path, the tornado damaged several homes, outbuildings, and a barn. The LaRue County tornado left $500,000 (2006 USD) in damage.

Another storm moving across the Ohio River and into Louisville, Kentucky spawned a tornado that damaged several houses before dissipating. As the supercell thunderstorm crossed over Louisville, National Weather Service NEXRAD doppler capability detected rotation at the mid-levels of the thunderstorm as it crossed the city, producing hail and heavy rain. In Adair County, two tornadoes were reported. One was an F2 tornado which touched down south of Columbia, destroying a mobile home and damaging several houses. Another tornado, an F1 touched down near Pellyton, causing damage to several homes. In Lincoln County, another thunderstorm spawned a tornado that touched down 3 miles south of McKinney and moved northeast, peaking at F2 strength before dissipating. The tornado damaged or destroyed several mobile homes and injured two people person. Damage from the tornado amounted to $350,000 (2006 USD).

=== Central and Southeastern Georgia tornadoes ===
As the low pressure system crossed the Ohio Valley, it triggered more severe thunderstorms across Georgia and South Carolina. The severe weather spawned six tornadoes ranging from F0 to F3 on the Fujita Scale. The first tornado touched down near Palmetto and moved southwest. The F2 tornado caused moderate damage to trees and destroyed an apartment house. Damage from the tornado amounted to $225,000 (USD) In Pike County, an F3 tornado touched down south of Hollonville. The tornado damaged or destroyed five houses and injured three people. Damage in Pike County, Georgia amounted to $750,000 (2006 USD). The same thunderstorm that produced the tornado in Pike County, produced another tornado that touched down in Lamar County causing minor tree damage. In Henry County, Georgia a short lived F1 tornado caused minor tree damage while in Jones County, an F1 tornado touched down near Wayside where it damaged a three mobile homes and destroyed a machine shop. Later in Johnson County, a tornado touched down near Kite where it moved 2 miles before crossing into Emanuel County causing moderate tree damage.

== Non tornadic events ==
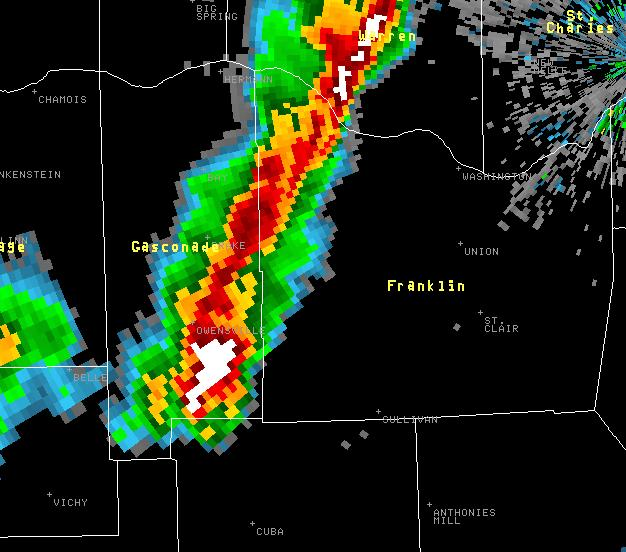
Supercell thunderstorm in Gasconade County, Missouri.

=== High winds ===
The line of severe thunderstorms also produced high winds, heavy rainfall and hail across the Ohio Valley. and Southeastern United States. In Indiana a thunderstorm caused scattered power outages and one fatality was reported in Evansville. A weather station in Jeffersonville reported winds of 60 mph. In Chicago, Illinois, high winds left 11,500 residents without power and cancelled flights at O'Hare International Airport. In Kentucky, a line of severe thunderstorms crossed into Madison County. The winds caused moderate damage to trees and homes. Severe thunderstorms also caused wind damage in Casey County. In Georgia, a line of thunderstorms produced sustained winds of 40-45 mph which caused damage to trees and houses. In South Carolina, the storm brought 55 mph winds producing damage to trees and mobile homes.

=== Hail and rainfall ===
In Indiana, there was hail up to 1.25 inches. The storm also dropped 1.3 inches of rain across the state. Hail up 0.75 inches was reported in Illinois. Hail was also reported in Michigan. and Missouri. In Georgia, a police officer reported nickel-sized hail.
