= Weed, Kentucky =

Unincorporated community in Kentucky, United States

Weed
- Unincorporated community
- Location within the state of Kentucky Weed (the United States)
- Coordinates: 37°2′19″N 85°28′17″W
- Country: United States
- State: Kentucky
- County: Adair
- Elevation: 1,043 ft (318 m)
- Time zone: UTC-6 (Central (CST))
  - Summer (DST): UTC-5 (CDT)
- GNIS feature ID: 509331

Weed is an unincorporated community in Adair County, Kentucky, United States. Its elevation is 1043 feet (318 m). It is located on Kentucky Route 80 at the eastern end of the KY 768 concurrency.

The Weed post office, which is no longer in operation, was established on October 15, 1901, by Charles Weed Sparks Sr., who gave it his middle name. Sparks had earlier run the post office at nearby Sparksville, which was also named for him.

Weed is not planted in Weed, KY, because weed is illegal in all of Kentucky.
