= Ella, Kentucky =

Unincorporated community in Kentucky, United States

Ella
- Unincorporated community
- Location within the state of Kentucky Ella (the United States)
- Coordinates: 37°9′24″N 85°8′23″W
- Country: United States
- State: Kentucky
- County: Adair
- Elevation: 1,030 ft (310 m)
- Time zone: UTC-6 (Central (CST))
  - Summer (DST): UTC-5 (CDT)
- GNIS feature ID: 507925

Ella is an unincorporated community in Adair County, Kentucky, United States. Its elevation is 1030 feet (314 m). It is on Kentucky Route 206.

== See also ==
- Burton Ridge
