= Kentucky Route 206 =

State highway in Kentucky, USA

Kentucky Route 206
- KY 206 highlighted in red

Route information
- Maintained by KYTC
- Length: 23.6 mi (38.0 km)

Major junctions
- West end: KY 55 Bus. in Columbia
- KY 531 in Christine; KY 76 near Ella
- East end: KY 70 southwest of Liberty

Location
- Country: United States
- State: Kentucky
- Counties: Adair, Casey

Highway system
- Kentucky State Highway System; Interstate; US; State; Parkways
← KY 205	→ KY 207

Kentucky Route 206 (KY 206) is a 23.6-mile-long (38.0 km) state highway in the U.S. state of Kentucky. The highway connects mostly rural areas of Adair and Casey counties with Columbia.

== Route description ==
KY 206 begins at an intersection with KY 55 Bus. (Campbellsville Road) in Columbia, within Adair County and the Central Time Zone. It travels to the east-southeast and passes Lindsey Wilson College. On the northeastern edge of the college, it intersects the northern terminus of KY 2290 (Young Street). It curves to the northeast and intersects the northern terminus of KY 3491 (Greenhills Road). The highway crosses over Russell Creek, where it leaves Columbia. Almost immediately is an intersection with the southern terminus of KY 1323 (Bull Run Road). It passes New Columbia Cemetery before curving to the northeast and traveling through Garlin. The highway then enters Christine. There, it intersects the northern terminus of KY 531 (Christine Road). It also has an intersection with the southern terminus of KY 2969 (Snake Creek Road). KY 206 heads to the east-northeast and travels through Purdy and Ella. East-northeast of Ella, it begins a concurrency with KY 76. The two highways travel to the north-northeast and cross over Drye Branch just before intersecting the southern terminus of KY 2289 (Dunnville Road) south-southwest of Eunice. Northwest of Eunice, they intersect the northern terminus of KY 2289 (Eunice–Dunnville Road). They begin to curve to the northeast before crossing over the Green River. In Neatsville, they split. KY 206 crosses over the Bear and Barnett creeks before curving to the east-southeast and traveling through Pellyton. The highway then intersects the southern terminus of KY 2970 (Sanders Ridge Road) and crosses over Spruce Pine Creek before entering Casey County. It curves to the northeast and intersects the western terminus of KY 3272 (Riffe Creek Road). It curves to the north-northeast and crosses over Riffe Creek. In Rheber, it intersects the northern terminus of KY 1640 (Red Hill Road). It curves to the northwest and meets its northern terminus, an intersection with KY 70.

== Major intersections ==
County	Location	mi	km	Destinations	Notes
Adair	Columbia	0.0	0.0	KY 55 Bus. (Campbellsville Road)	Western terminus
Adair	Columbia	0.5	0.80	KY 2290 south (Young Street)	Northern terminus of KY 2290
Adair	Columbia	0.8	1.3	KY 3491 south (Greenhills Road)	Northern terminus of KY 3491
Adair		0.9	1.4	KY 1323 north (Bull Run Road)	Southern terminus of KY 1323
Adair	Christine	6.6	10.6	KY 531 south (Christine Road)	Northern terminus of KY 531
Adair	Christine	6.9	11.1	KY 2969 north (Snake Creek Road)	Southern terminus of KY 2969
Adair		11.4	18.3	KY 76 south	Western end of KY 76 concurrency
Adair		12.6	20.3	KY 2289 north (Dunnville Road)	Southern terminus of KY 2289
Adair		13.6	21.9	KY 2289 south (Eunice–Dunnville Road)	Northern terminus of KY 2289
Adair	Neatsville	14.2	22.9	KY 76 north	Eastern end of KY 76 concurrency
Adair		17.1	27.5	KY 2970 north (Sanders Ridge Road)	Southern terminus of KY 2970
Casey		18.5	29.8	KY 3272 east (Riffe Creek Road)	Western terminus of KY 3272
Casey	Rheber	22.6	36.4	KY 1640 south (Red Hill Road)	Northern terminus of KY 1640
Casey		23.6	38.0	KY 70 – Campbellsville, Liberty	Eastern terminus
1.000 mi = 1.609 km; 1.000 km = 0.621 mi
