= Gadberry =

Gadberry may refer to:

- A minor planet, see List of minor planets: 20001–21000
- Gadberry, Kentucky, a community in the United States
