= Candace Clark =

Candace Clark or Candice Clark may refer to:

- Candy Clark (born 1947), American actress and model
- Candice Clark, American former slalom canoeist
- Candace Clark, individual involved in the Garlin murder case in 2007
