= Burton Ridge =

Coordinates: 37.122°N 85.245°W

Burton Ridge is an area located in the eastern region of Adair County, Kentucky. Burton Ridge includes the communities of Beulah Chapel, Vester, Christine, Purdy, and Ella. Burton Ridge has a very strong, rich, and colorful history. Bearwallow Cemetery, located at Christine, is one of Burton Ridge's most prominent landmarks. Arthur Burton (1794–1855) was one of the first members of the Burton family to reside in the proximity of Burton Ridge. Arthur Burton was born in Virginia and lived in Pulaski County, Kentucky, before residing in Adair County. Arthur Burton died in Adair County. Many residents of Burton Ridge are descendants of Arthur Burton.
