= Toria, Kentucky =

Unincorporated community in Kentucky, United States

Toria
- Unincorporated community
- Location within the state of Kentucky Toria (the United States)
- Coordinates: 36°59′22″N 85°26′15″W
- Country: United States
- State: Kentucky
- County: Adair
- Elevation: 1,040 ft (320 m)
- Time zone: UTC-6 (Central (CST))
  - Summer (DST): UTC-5 (CDT)
- GNIS feature ID: 509223

Toria is an unincorporated community in Adair County, Kentucky, United States. Its elevation is 1040 feet (317 m).
