= Knifley, Kentucky =

Unincorporated community in Kentucky, United States

Knifley
- Unincorporated community
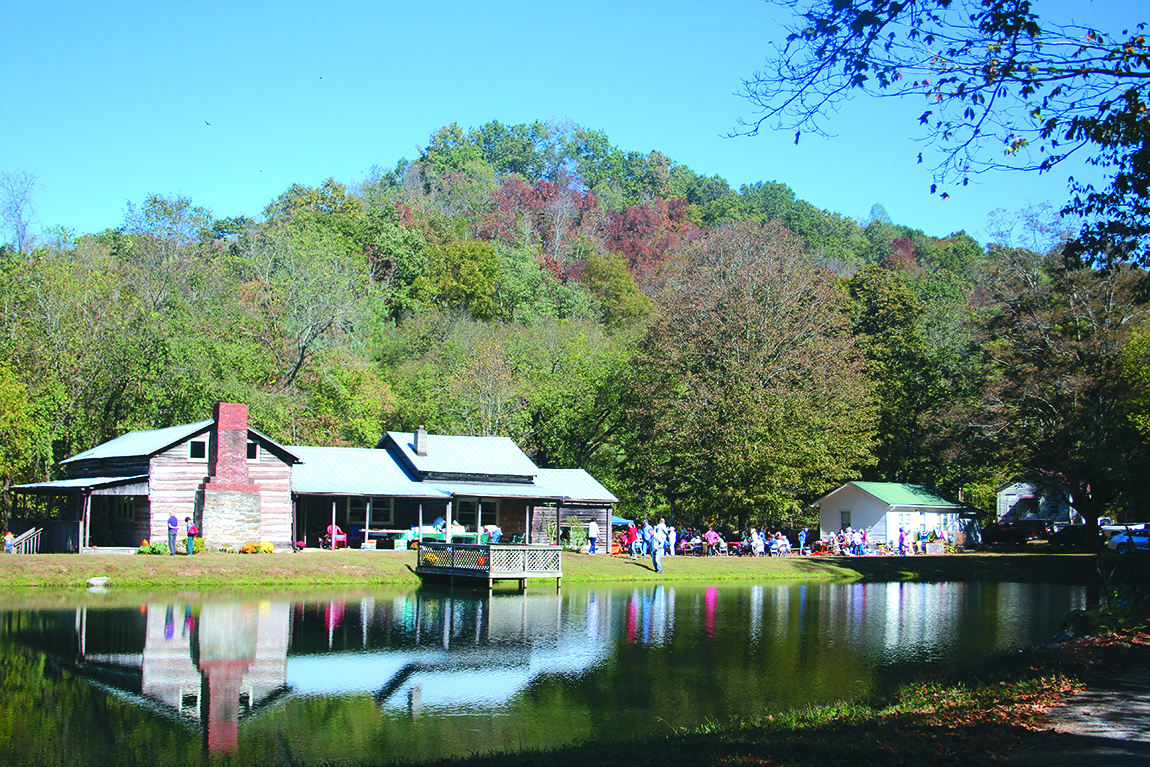
- The Janice Holt and Henry Giles Loghouse in Knifley

- Location within the state of Kentucky Knifley (the United States)
- Coordinates: 37°14′34″N 85°11′22″W
- Country: United States
- State: Kentucky
- County: Adair
- Elevation: 718 ft (219 m)
- Time zone: UTC-6 (Central (CST))
  - Summer (DST): UTC-5 (CDT)
- ZIP code: 42753
- Area codes: 270 and 364
- GNIS feature ID: 508402

Knifley is an unincorporated community near Columbia in Adair County, Kentucky, United States. Its elevation is 718 feet (219 m).

== History ==
The Knifley Christian Church holds an annual community fish fry every May, free for all. Knifley also has a volunteer fire department.

The community is home to the Janice Holt and Henry Giles Log House, which is listed on the National Register of Historic Places.

On February 13, 2014, a 30-inch diameter Columbia Gulf Transmission gas pipeline carrying natural gas exploded near Knifley, sending two people to the hospital with injuries, destroying two houses, and alarming residents, who saw flames from miles away. Later, it was determined that Hydrogen embrittlement had caused the pipe failure, which occurred during installation in 1965.

== Geography ==
Knifley is located on Kentucky Route 76 (KY 76) at the intersection of KY 551, and KY 206. The Plum Point Bridge crosses over the Green River on KY 551 in the community.

== Notable people ==
- Jody Richards, former member of the Kentucky House of Representatives, was born here.
- Janice Holt Giles, writer.
