= Feathersburg, Kentucky =

Unincorporated community in Kentucky, United States

Feathersburg
- Unincorporated community
- Location within the state of Kentucky Feathersburg (the United States)
- Coordinates: 37°18′41″N 85°10′9″W
- Country: United States
- State: Kentucky
- County: Adair
- Elevation: 1,027 ft (313 m)
- Time zone: UTC-6 (Central (CST))
  - Summer (DST): UTC-5 (CDT)
- GNIS feature ID: 507984

Feathersburg is an unincorporated community in Adair County, Kentucky, United States. Its elevation is 1027 feet (313 m).
