= Purdy, Kentucky =

Unincorporated community in Kentucky, United States

Purdy
- Unincorporated community
- Location within the state of Kentucky Purdy (the United States)
- Coordinates: 37°9′5″N 85°11′6″W
- Country: United States
- State: Kentucky
- County: Adair
- Elevation: 1,017 ft (310 m)
- Time zone: UTC-6 (Central (CST))
  - Summer (DST): UTC-5 (CDT)
- GNIS feature ID: 508885

Purdy is an unincorporated community in Adair County, Kentucky, United States. Its elevation is 1017 feet (310 m). It is on Kentucky Route 206.

== See also ==
Burton Ridge
