= Oak Hill Cemetery (Newnan, Georgia) =

- U.S. National Register of Historic Places
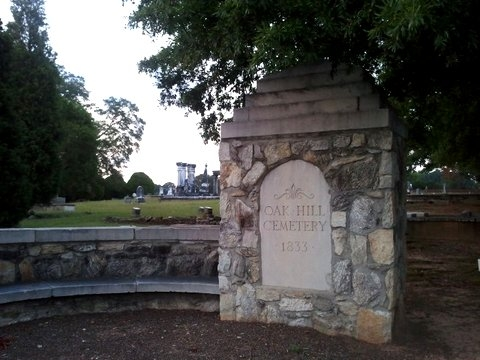
- Oak Hill Cemetery in 2012

- Location within Georgia
- Nearest city: Newnan, Georgia
- Coordinates: 33°23′9″N 84°47′52″W
- Area: 60 acres (24 ha)
- Built: 1833
- NRHP reference No.: 11001054
- Added to NRHP: January 27, 2012

Oak Hill Cemetery is a cemetery in Newnan, Coweta County, Georgia. It was added to the National Register of Historic Places on January 27, 2012. It is located at 96 Jefferson Street in Newnan.

== History ==
The Oak Hill Cemetery was founded in 1833. 268 Confederate Army soldiers are buried at Oak Hill and two are labeled as "Unknown". The cemetery covers 60 acres (24 ha) and has over 12,000 gravesites.

== Notable interments ==
- Ellis Arnall (1907–1992), Governor of Georgia
- William Yates Atkinson (1854–1899), Governor of Georgia
- Hugh Buchanan (1823–1890), U.S. Representative from Georgia
- Albert Sidney Camp (1892–1954), U.S. Representative from Georgia
- James C. Davis (1895–1981), U.S. Representative from Georgia
- William Barton Wade Dent (1806–1855), U.S. Representative from Georgia
- Charles L. Moses (1856–1910), U.S. Representative from Georgia
- Jesse Calaway Wootten (1836–1874), newspaperman and founder of Newnan Times-Herald
- William C. Wright (1866–1933), U.S. Representative from Georgia

== See also ==
- National Register of Historic Places listings in Coweta County, Georgia
