= Garlini =

Garlini is an Italian surname. Notable people with the surname include:

- Oliviero Garlini (1957-2025), Italian footballer
- Ruben Garlini (born 1971), Italian footballer

== See also ==
- Carlini (name)
- Garlin (surname)
