= Inroad, Kentucky =

Unincorporated community in Kentucky, United States

Inroad
- Unincorporated community
- Location within the state of Kentucky Inroad (the United States)
- Coordinates: 36°57′23″N 85°16′47″W
- Country: United States
- State: Kentucky
- County: Adair
- Elevation: 630 ft (190 m)
- Time zone: UTC-6 (Central (CST))
  - Summer (DST): UTC-5 (CDT)
- GNIS feature ID: 508314

Inroad is an unincorporated community in Adair County, Kentucky, United States. Its elevation is 630 feet (192 m).
