= Elkhorn, Kentucky =

Elkhorn, Kentucky, may refer to either of:

- Elk Horn, Kentucky
- Elkhorn City, Kentucky, originally named (and sometimes shortened to) Elkhorn
