= Senator Haralson =

Senator Haralson may refer to:

- Hugh A. Haralson (1805–1854), Georgia State Senate
- Jeremiah Haralson (1846–1916), Alabama State Senate
