= Christine, Kentucky =

Unincorporated community in Kentucky, United States

Christine
- Unincorporated community
- Location within the state of Kentucky Christine (the United States)
- Coordinates: 37°8′32″N 85°12′25″W
- Country: United States
- State: Kentucky
- County: Adair
- Elevation: 984 ft (300 m)
- Time zone: UTC-6 (Central (CST))
  - Summer (DST): UTC-5 (CDT)
- GNIS feature ID: 507700

Christine is an unincorporated community in Adair County, Kentucky, United States. Its elevation is 984 feet (300 m). It is on Kentucky Route 206 at the northern terminus of Kentucky Route 531.

== History ==
On April 27, 1971, an F4 tornado struck Christine.

== See also ==
- Burton Ridge
