= Eunice, Kentucky =

Unincorporated community in Kentucky, United States

Eunice
- Unincorporated community
- Location within the state of Kentucky Eunice (the United States)
- Coordinates: 37°10′59″N 85°7′20″W
- Country: United States
- State: Kentucky
- County: Adair
- Elevation: 781 ft (238 m)
- Time zone: UTC-6 (Central (CST))
  - Summer (DST): UTC-5 (CDT)
- GNIS feature ID: 507955

Eunice is an unincorporated community in Adair County, Kentucky, United States. Its elevation is 781 feet (238 m). It is on Kentucky Route 206 at the intersection of Kentucky Route 2289 and Kentucky Route 76.
