= A. Sidney Camp =

American politician, educator and lawyer

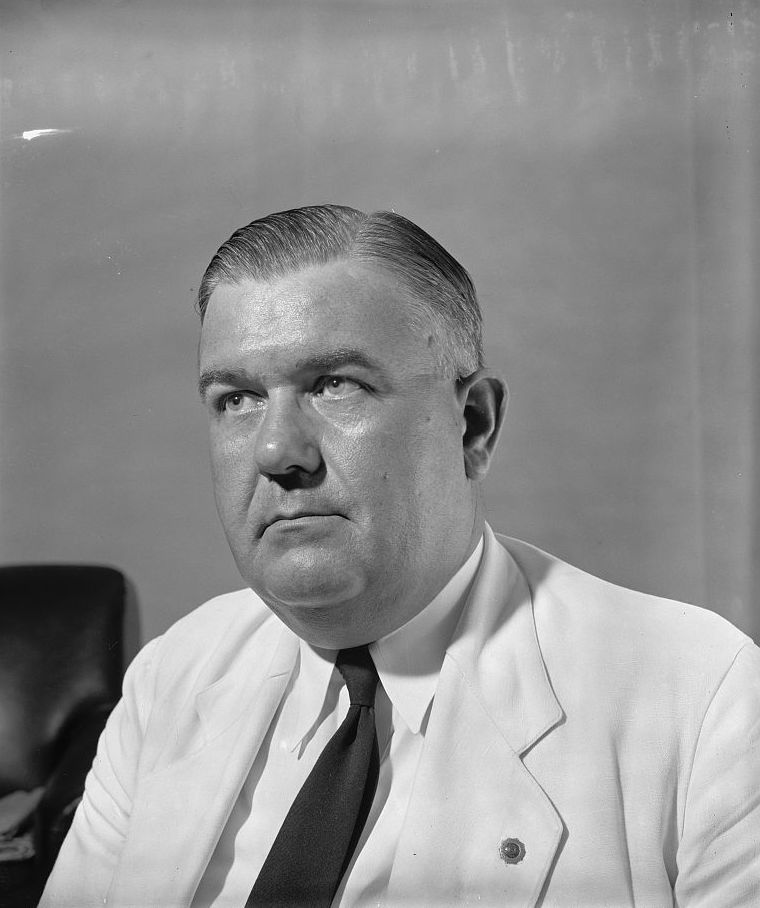
Albert Sidney Camp, 1939

Albert Sidney Camp (July 26, 1892 – July 24, 1954) was an American politician, educator and lawyer.

== Biography ==
Camp was born in Moreland, Georgia. The Camp family was a colonial family with ancestors arriving in the American colonies during the 17th century. Albert Sidney Camp was named for a Confederate General, Albert Sidney Johnston, under whom his great-grandfather served during the American Civil War.

Albert Sidney Camp attended the University of Georgia School of Law in Athens where he was a member of the Phi Kappa Literary Society. He graduated with a Bachelor of Laws (B.L.) degree in 1915 and was admitted to the GA state bar and became a practicing lawyer in Newnan, Georgia.

From 1917 to 1919, Mr. Camp served in World War I as a member of the Headquarters Detachment of the Eighty-second Division. After the war, Albert Camp attended the University of Edinburgh.

Mr. Camp served in the Georgia House of Representatives from 1923 through 1928 and later as an assistant United States attorney for Georgia's northern district from 1934 through 1939. Camp was elected to fill the seat of the deceased Emmett M. Owen in the U.S. House of Representatives and served in that position from 1939 until his death from a liver ailment at the Bethesda Naval Hospital in Bethesda, Maryland on July 24, 1954.

Camp was a close friend of President Franklin Delano Roosevelt, and is credited with introducing Roosevelt to the mineral springs at Warm Springs, Georgia. Mr. Camp is buried in Oak Hill Cemetery in Newnan.

== See also ==
- List of members of the United States Congress who died in office (1950–1999)

U.S. House of Representatives
Preceded by Emmett M. Owen	Member of the U.S. House of Representatives from Georgia's 4th congressional district August 1, 1939 – July 24, 1954	Succeeded by John J. Flynt, Jr.
