= Kellyville, Kentucky =

Unincorporated community in Kentucky, United States

Kellyville
- Unincorporated community
- Location within the state of Kentucky Kellyville (the United States)
- Coordinates: 37°11′50″N 85°19′32″W
- Country: United States
- State: Kentucky
- County: Adair
- Elevation: 758 ft (231 m)
- Time zone: UTC-6 (Central (CST))
  - Summer (DST): UTC-5 (CDT)
- GNIS feature ID: 508375

Kellyville is an unincorporated community in Adair County, Kentucky, United States. Its elevation is 758 feet (231 m). It is on Kentucky Route 682 and KY 2971.
