= William C. Wright =

American politician (1866–1933)

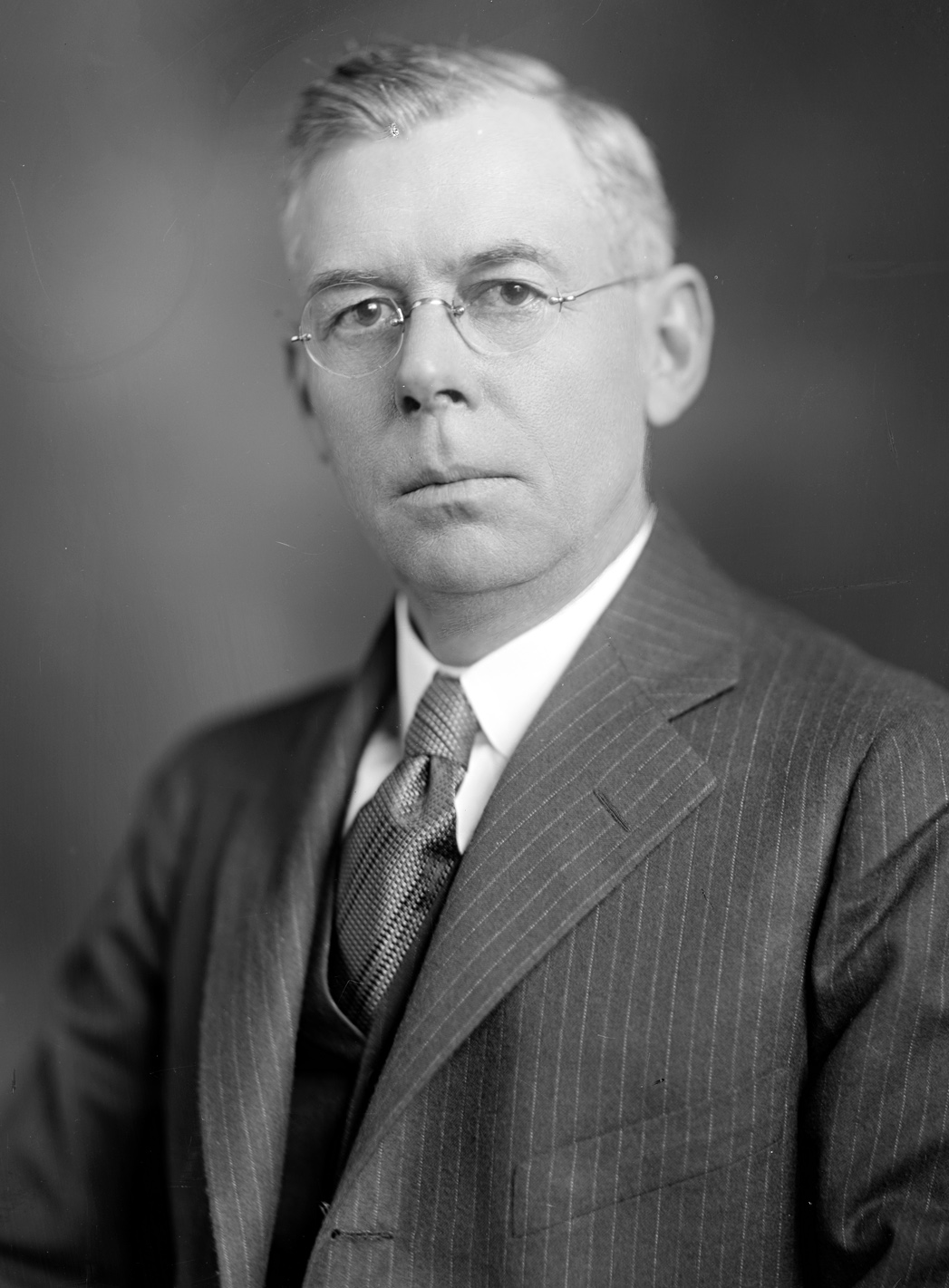

Member of the U.S. House of Representatives from Georgia's 4th district
- In office January 16, 1918 – March 3, 1933
- Preceded by: William C. Adamson
- Succeeded by: Emmett M. Owen

Personal details
- Born: William Carter Wright; January 6, 1866 Carroll County, Georgia, U.S.
- Died: June 11, 1933 (aged 67) Newnan, Georgia, U.S.
- Resting place: Oak Hill Cemetery, Newnan, Georgia, U.S.
- Party: Democratic
- Profession: Politician, lawyer

William Carter Wright (January 6, 1866 – June 11, 1933) was a U.S. representative from Georgia.

Born on a farm in Carroll County, Georgia, Wright moved with his parents to Newnan, Georgia, in 1869. He attended the common and high schools of Newnan. He studied law. He was admitted to the bar in 1886. He was a lawyer in private practice. Banker. Farmer. City attorney for Newnan, Georgia from 1892 to 1895. He served as solicitor of the city court of Newnan, Georgia from 1894 to 1903. He served as member of the board of education from 1910 to 1918. He served as chairman of the Democratic Georgia state executive committees, 1910 and 1911.

Wright was elected as a Democrat to the Sixty-fifth Congress to fill the vacancy caused by the resignation of United States Representative William C. Adamson. He was reelected to the Sixty-sixth and to the six succeeding Congresses (January 16, 1918 – March 3, 1933). He did not seek renomination to the Seventy-third Congress in 1932. He died on June 11, 1933, in Newnan, Georgia. He was interred in Oak Hill Cemetery in Newnan.

U.S. House of Representatives
Preceded by William C. Adamson	Member of the U.S. House of Representatives from Georgia's 4th congressional district 1918–1933	Succeeded by Emmett M. Owen
