= Charles L. Moses =

American politician

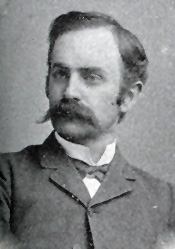

Member of the U.S. House of Representatives from Georgia's 4th district
- In office March 4, 1891 – March 3, 1897
- Preceded by: Thomas W. Grimes
- Succeeded by: William C. Adamson

Member of the Georgia House of Representatives
- In office 1900–1904

Personal details
- Born: May 2, 1856 Turin, Georgia, U.S.
- Died: October 10, 1913 (aged 57) Atlanta, Georgia, U.S.
- Resting place: Oak Hill Cemetery; Newnan, Georgia, U.S.

Charles Leavell Moses (May 2, 1856 – October 10, 1913) was a U.S. representative from Georgia.

Born near Turin, Georgia, Moses attended small country schools and ultimately graduated from Mercer University, Macon, Georgia, in 1876. He later engaged in teaching and agricultural pursuits. For several years he served as principal of the Newnan Academy for Boys. After 1886, he devoted his time exclusively to agricultural interests, and was also involved in the Farmers' Alliance.

Moses was elected as a Democrat to the Fifty-second, Fifty-third, and Fifty-fourth Congresses (March 4, 1891 – March 3, 1897). He served as Chairman of the Committee on Pensions (Fifty-third Congress). He was unsuccessful in his candidacy for renomination in 1896, after which he resumed his agricultural pursuits in Turin, Georgia. He served as delegate to several Democratic State and National Conventions. He served as a member of the Georgia State House of Representatives, from 1900 to 1904. He retired and moved to Atlanta, Georgia, where he died October 10, 1913, and was ultimately interred in Oak Hill Cemetery.

U.S. House of Representatives
Preceded by Thomas W. Grimes	Member of the U.S. House of Representatives from Georgia's 4th congressional district March 4, 1891 – March 3, 1897	Succeeded by William C. Adamson
