= William B. W. Dent =

American politician (1806–1855)

William B.W. Dent

Member of the U.S. House of Representatives from Georgia's 4th district
- In office March 4, 1853 – March 3, 1855
- Preceded by: Charles Murphey
- Succeeded by: Hiram B. Warner

Member of the Georgia House of Representatives
- In office 1843

Personal details
- Born: William Barton Wade Dent; September 8, 1806 Bryantown, Maryland, U.S.
- Died: September 7, 1855 (aged 48) Newnan, Georgia, U.S.
- Resting place: Oak Hill Cemetery; Newnan, Georgia, U.S.
- Party: Democratic

William Barton Wade Dent (September 8, 1806 – September 7, 1855) was an American politician, educator, soldier and businessman from Georgia. He represented Georgia in the U.S. Congress for one term from 1853 to 1855.

== Early life ==
Dent was born in Bryantown, Maryland, in 1806 and attended Charlotte Hall Military Academy in Charlotte Hall, Maryland. He graduated from Charlotte Hall Military Academy in 1823 and moved the next year to Mallorysville in Wilkes County, Georgia, and taught school.

== Career ==
In 1827, Dent pursued mercantile interests in [ Bullsboro, Georgia. He was also a key founding member of the city of Newnan, Georgia, in 1828. Dent pursued farming and milling in Coweta, Carroll and Heard Counties. He also did business in land holdings in Alabama, Georgia, Arkansas, Tennessee and Texas. Dent also served as a colonel in the Georgia Militia during the Creek War.

In 1843, Dent served in the Georgia House of Representatives. He returned to Newnan in 1849 and presided as judge of the inferior court of Coweta County.

=== Congress ===
In 1852, he was elected as a Democratic Representative of Georgia's 4th congressional district to the 33rd United States Congress and served one term from March 4, 1853, to March 3, 1855.

He did not run for reelection to the 34th Congress in 1854.

== Personal life ==
Dent was married to Sarah Elizabeth Hinton.

In the 1850 U.S. Census, Dent was listed as having land holdings valued at $50,000 (~$1.46 million in 2024).

Dent died in Newnan on September 7, 1855, and was buried in Oak Hill Cemetery in Newnan, Georgia.

U.S. House of Representatives
Preceded by Charles Murphey	Member of the U.S. House of Representatives from Georgia's 4th congressional district March 4, 1853 – March 3, 1855	Succeeded by Hiram B. Warner
