= Hollonville, Georgia =

Unincorporated community in Pike County, Georgia

Coordinates: 33.16250°N 84.45610°W

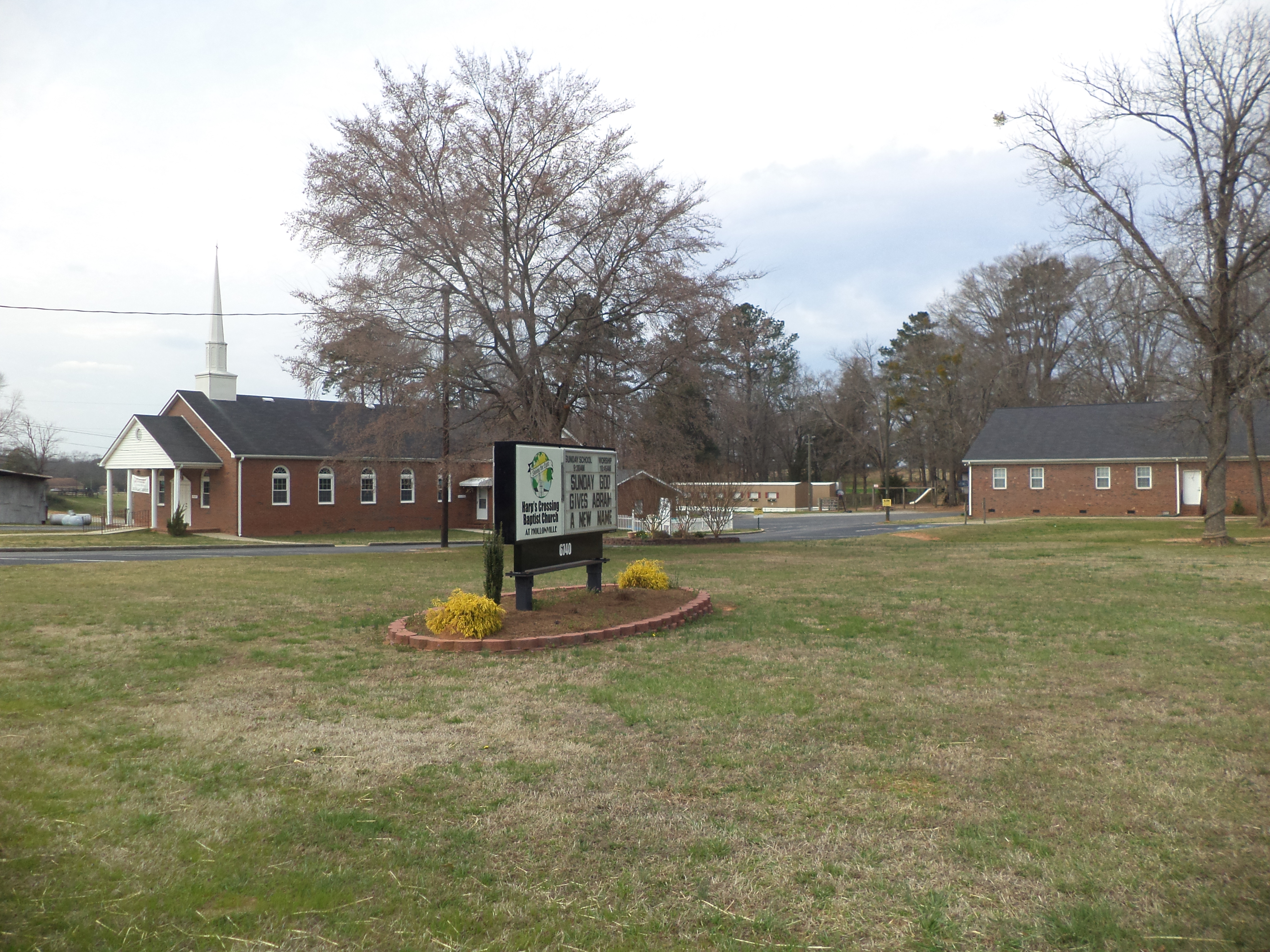
Harp's Crossing Baptist Church in Hollonville

Hollonville is an unincorporated community in Pike County, Georgia, United States.

A "crossroad town", Hollonville is found near Williamson, Georgia, found within the intersection of Georgia Highway 362, Hollonville Road and Concord Road. Hollonville is served by several places of worship including Harp's Crossing Baptist Church and the United Methodist Church of Hollonville, established in the 1840s.

== History ==
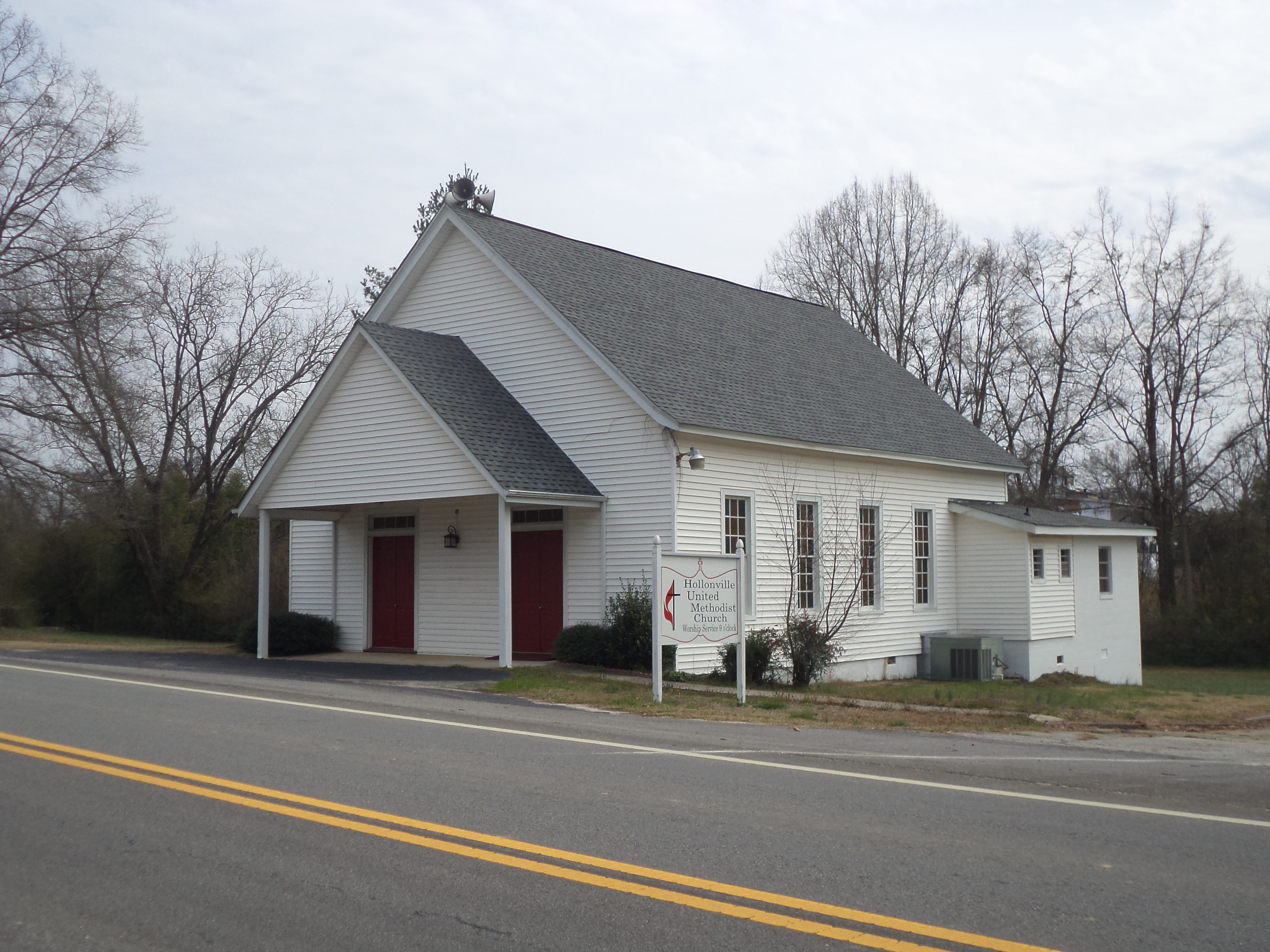
Hollonville United Methodist Church

Hollonville is so named for Randolph Hollon, a North Carolina planter who moved to Georgia and started a farm here. Hollon's farm grew into a commercial community, and he would be worth a "hundred thousand dollars" before the outbreak of the Civil War. Five of his sons would join the Confederacy. He was described as belonging "to no church or society, and his life seems to have been absorbed in the pleasure of money-making." Randolph Hollon died in 1863, and his children would later move to Texas.

According to a 1922 History of Pike County, at the time, unincorporated Hollonville was served by two stores, a cannery, and a school with eight grades. The Hollonville Baptist Church was organized in 1874 but is no longer existing today.

=== Tornadoes ===
Hollonville is known for extreme weather and has experienced tornado activity throughout its history. In 2006, Hollonville was affected in one of the largest January tornado outbreaks in United States history. The Hollonville GA F3 Tornado touched down on January 2, 2006, and had a path of three miles long. In October 2020, Hollonville experienced another tornado touchdown. In 2023, a rain-wrapped tornado touched down a mile west of town, causing extensive tree and roof damage.

== See also ==
- Emmett Marshall Owen (1877 – 1939) politician, educator, farmer and lawyer, born near Hollonville.
