= Jesse Calaway Wootten =

- Born: October 6, 1836
- Died: January 22, 1874 (aged 37)
- Burial place: Oak Hill Cemetery
- Known for: Founder of precursor to the Newnan Times-Herald

Jesse Calaway Wootten (6 October 1836 – 22 January 1874) was a lawyer, editor, and newspaper founder in the United States.

Wootten was an editor of The Carrollton Advocate and a founder and editor of The Newnan Herald, which later became The Newnan Times-Herald.

== Career ==
As a lawyer, Wootten was a partner in Black & Wootten, Attorneys at Law in Carrollton, Georgia.

In 1860, Wootten was one of a group "appointed by the Democratic Executive Committee of the State of Georgia, Sub-Electors for [. . .] counties in the 4th Congressional District," in which he represented Carroll County.

In 1860, Wootten sold his interest in The Carrollton Advocate, a newspaper founded earlier that year. Wootten wrote, "I will continue to edit it, however, and have otherwise unlimited control of its columns for a specified time longer."

In 1862, Wootten enlisted with Confederate forces to fight in the American Civil War. Wootten was the adjutant's clerk in the Georgia artillery's 12th Battalion. Wootten was discharged in 1863.

Wootten and fellow attorney J. S. Bigby founded The Newnan Herald in September 1865, "making it the first newspaper founded and published in Georgia after the end of the Civil War." Its first issue was published on 9 September 1865, with Wootten as editor. The paper eventually became The Newnan Times-Herald.

== Personal life ==
Wootten was born on 6 October 1836 to Henry Pope Wootten and Melissa Caroline Wootten (née Hinton) in Wilkes County, Georgia.

In 1859, Wootten married Frances Jane Dent. They had four children.

Wootten died on 22 January 1874. Wootten's obituary in The Newnan Herald, published on 6 February 1874, included the following: "As an editor his pen was active in advocating such measures as he believed to be of local or general advantage. Scrupulously avoiding all personalities and unjust criticisms, he endeavored to make his paper a model of high toned and dignified journalism."

Wootten was a great-grandparent of Lucius Linton Deck, Junior.
