= Garlin, Kentucky =

Unincorporated community in Kentucky, United States

Garlin
- Unincorporated community
- Location within the state of Kentucky Garlin (the United States)
- Coordinates: 37°6′50″N 85°15′8″W
- Country: United States
- State: Kentucky
- County: Adair
- Elevation: 892 ft (272 m)
- Time zone: UTC-6 (Central (CST))
  - Summer (DST): UTC-5 (CDT)
- GNIS feature ID: 492704

Garlin is an unincorporated community in Adair County, Kentucky, United States. Its elevation is 892 feet (272 m). It is on Kentucky Route 206.

== History ==
A post office was established in the community in 1903 and probably named for its first postmaster.
