= Emmett M. Owen =

American politician (1877–1939)

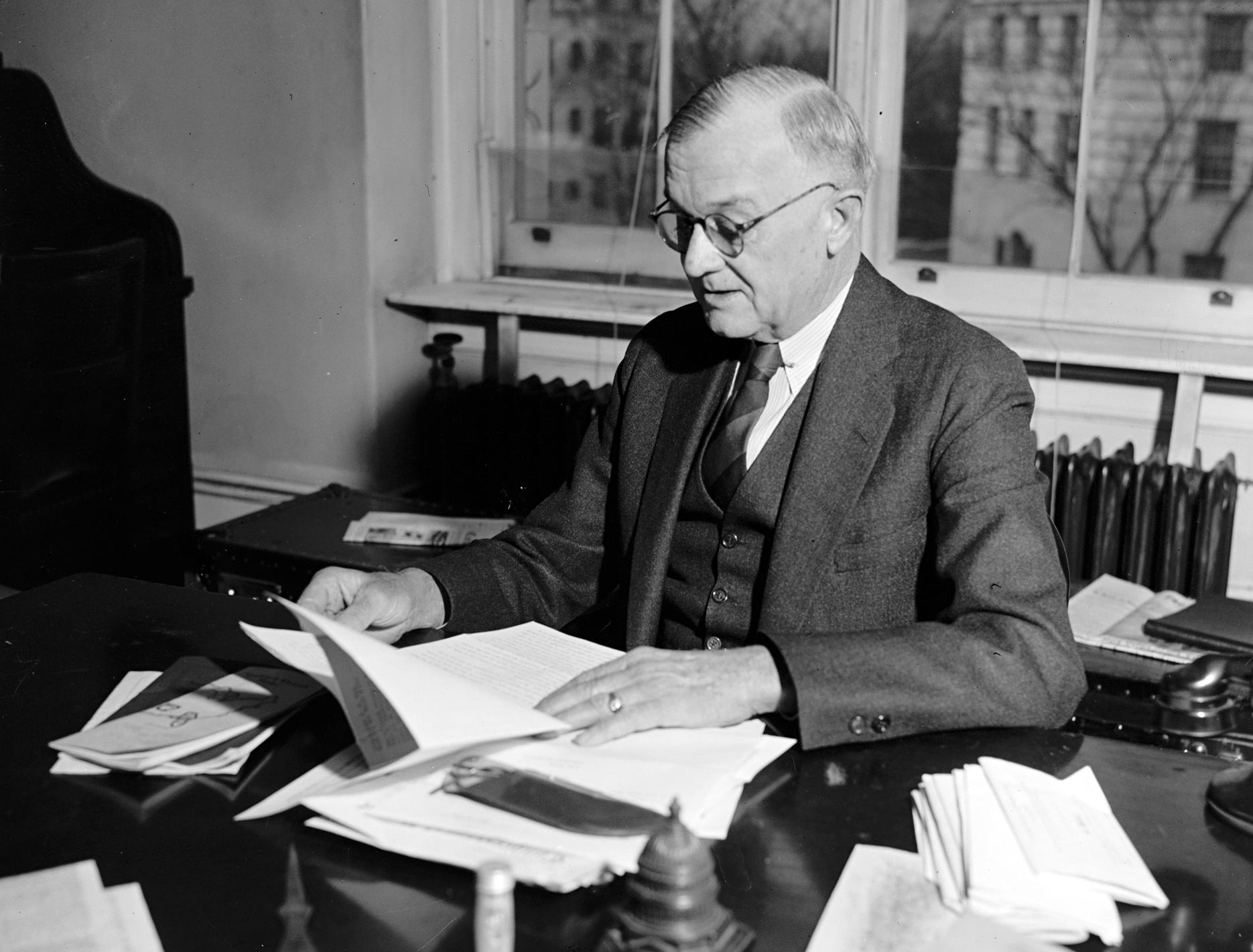
- Owen, c. 1938

Member of the U.S. House of Representatives from Georgia's 4th district
- In office March 4, 1933 – June 21, 1939
- Preceded by: William C. Wright
- Succeeded by: A. Sidney Camp

Member of the Georgia House of Representatives
- In office 1902–1906

Mayor of Zebulon, Georgia
- In office 1905–1907

Personal details
- Born: Emmett Marshall Owen; October 19, 1877 Hollonville, Georgia, US
- Died: June 21, 1939 (aged 61) Washington, D.C., US
- Education: Gordon State College; University of Georgia School of Law
- Occupation: Politician

Emmett Marshall Owen (October 19, 1877 – June 21, 1939) was an American politician. A Democrat, he was a member of the United States House of Representatives from Georgia.

== Biography ==
Owen was born on October 19, 1877, near Hollonville, Georgia. He attended the Hollonville Grammar School, going on to graduate from Gordon State College and the University of Georgia School of Law, in 1898 and 1900, respectively. From 1901 to 1902, he worked as an educator in Butts and Meriwether Counties, and in 1902 was admitted to the bar, after which he practiced law in Zebulon. He was also a peach farmer and newspaper editor, of the Pike County Journal.

A Democrat, Owen served in the Georgia House of Representatives from 1902 to 1906. From 1905 to 1907, he was mayor of Zebulon. He was Pike County Court Commissioner from 1906 to 1909, Zebulon Court Commissioner from 1909 to 1912, and Solicitor General of the Flint Court from 1913 to 1923. He represented the Georgia's 4th district in the United States House of Representatives, fron March 4, 1933, to June 21, 1939. While serving, he was a member of the Committees on Oversight and Government Reform and on the Judiciary.

Owen was married to Alma Jones (died 1928), with whom he had two children. He was a Baptist, as well as a member of multiple fraternities, such as the Freemasons, Shriners, Knights of Pythias, Benevolent and Protective Order of Elks, and Odd Fellows. He died on June 21, 1939, aged 61, in Washington, D.C., from heart disease; he died in office. After his death, his children each received a $5,000 benefit from the federal government. He was buried on June 25, at the East View Cemetery, in Zebulon. On April 24, 1940, Congressmen John Marvin Jones and Milton A. Romjue delivered memorial speeches in his honor.

== See also ==
- List of members of the United States Congress who died in office (1900–1949)

U.S. House of Representatives
Preceded by William C. Wright	Member of the U.S. House of Representatives from Georgia's 4th congressional district March 4, 1933 – June 21, 1939	Succeeded by A. Sidney Camp
