= Gadberry, Kentucky =

Unincorporated community in Kentucky, United States

Gadberry
- Unincorporated community
- Location within the state of Kentucky Gadberry (the United States)
- Coordinates: 37°2′37″N 85°18′34″W
- Country: United States
- State: Kentucky
- County: Adair
- Elevation: 951 ft (290 m)
- Time zone: UTC-6 (Central (CST))
  - Summer (DST): UTC-5 (CDT)
- GNIS feature ID: 508057

Gadberry is an unincorporated community in Adair County, Kentucky, United States. Its elevation is 951 feet (290 m).

A post office operated in the community from 1884 to 1858. Gadberry was named for early settler James Gadberry.
