= Kentucky Route 76 =

State highway in Kentucky, United States

Kentucky Route 76
- KY 76 highlighted in red

Route information
- Maintained by KYTC
- Length: 36.714 mi (59.085 km)

Major junctions
- South end: Boat ramp on Lake Cumberland
- KY 80 near Russell Springs; US 127 near Russell Springs
- North end: KY 70 near Elk Horn

Location
- Country: United States
- State: Kentucky
- Counties: Russell, Taylor, Adair

Highway system
- Kentucky State Highway System; Interstate; US; State; Parkways
← KY 75	→ KY 77

Kentucky Route 76 (KY 76) is a 36.714-mile-long (59.085 km) state highway in Kentucky that runs from a boat ramp on Lake Cumberland west of Jabez to KY 70 northeast of Elk Horn via Eli, Neatsville, Knifley, and Yuma.

== Route description ==
After it begins on the shore of Lake Cumberland, KY 76 goes into a northwesterly path towards Salem. It intersects KY 910 and goes over an overpass that carries the highway over the Louie B. Nunn Cumberland Parkway before intersecting KY 80. It runs concurrently with KY 80 for about 0.54 miles (0.87 km), KY 76 goes on to meet U.S. Route 127, and it runs concurrently with that route in a southerly path for 0.985 miles (1.585 km) before turning right. KY 76 enters Adair County, where it has a junction with Kentucky Routes 206 and 551 in the communities of Neatsville and Knifley, respectively. It enters Taylor County, and meets its northern terminus at its junction with KY 70 at Elk Horn, just east of Campbellsville.

== History ==
KY 76 was originally an east–west highway going from KY 70 at Elk Horn to KY 206 at Neatsville, but followed a path into Casey County where it met US 127 at Dunnville. KY 76 has long been rerouted to its current length and path at some point around 1962–63.

== Major intersections ==
County	Location	mi	km	Destinations	Notes
Russell	Lake Cumberland	0.000	0.000	Boat ramp	Southern terminus
Russell		1.227	1.975	KY 1383 south	Northern terminus of KY 1383
Russell		2.652	4.268	KY 1611 south	Northern terminus of KY 1611
Russell		4.625	7.443	KY 3278 north (Rex Roat-Butcher Road) / Old Eli Road	Southern terminus of KY 3278
Russell		5.830	9.382	KY 910	
Russell		7.516	12.096	KY 80 east	South end of KY 80 overlap
Russell		7.985	12.851	KY 80 west	North end of KY 80 overlap
Russell		11.498	18.504	US 127 north	South end of US 127 overlap
Russell		12.483	20.089	US 127 south / Jericho Road	North end of US 127 overlap
Adair		18.575	29.894	KY 206 west (Liberty Road)	South end of KY 206 overlap
Adair		19.794	31.855	KY 2289 north / Rogers Lane	Southern terminus of KY 2289
Adair		20.870	33.587	KY 2289 south (Eunice-Dunnville Road) / Little Cake Road	Northern terminus of KY 2289
Adair	Neatsville	21.467	34.548	KY 206 east (Liberty Road)	North end of KY 206 overlap
Adair		25.160	40.491	KY 1104 north (Caldwell Ridge Road)	Southern terminus of KY 1104
Adair	Knifley	27.323	43.972	KY 551 (Knifley Road)	
Taylor		35.024	56.366	KY 1752 east (Speck Ridge Road)	Western terminus of KY 1752
Taylor		36.714	59.085	KY 70 (Elkhorn Road)	Northern terminus
1.000 mi = 1.609 km; 1.000 km = 0.621 mi: Concurrency terminus
