= Charles Murphey =

American politician (1799–1861)

Charles Murphey (May 9, 1799 – January 16, 1861) was an American lawyer and politician from the state of Georgia. He was born in Anderson, South Carolina.

== Early years and education ==
He attended the country schools, studied law, and was admitted to the bar in 1825. He began his practice in Decatur, Georgia.

== Political career ==
Murphey served as clerk of the superior court of DeKalb County, Georgia, from 1825 to 1827, as a member of the Georgia House of Representatives from 1839 through 1841, and as a member of the Georgia Senate in 1842, 1845, 1849–1850, and 1855–56. He was elected as a Unionist to the 32nd Congress (March 4, 1851 – March 3, 1853).

== Later years and death ==
Upon leaving the Congress, Murphey resumed the practice of law. He was selected to serve as a delegate to the 1860 Democratic National Convention held in Baltimore. He was later named as one of the two delegates from DeKalb County to the Georgia Ordinance of Secession held in Milledgeville. The vote on secession was scheduled to take place on January 18, 1861. DeKalb was in favor of preserving the Union and wanted a peaceful solution. Murphey intended to vote "no" on secession. In a speech delivered in 1922, Murphey's grandson said that his grandfather had prayed not to live to see the day that Georgia seceded and ironically his prayer was answered. Murphey died on January 16, 1861, just before the vote was taken. He was interred in Decatur City Cemetery.

== Legacy ==
A company of Confederate troops from DeKalb County was named the "Murphey Guards" in his honor. The company was outfitted, in part, by the wealthy family of Milton A. Candler, who after the war served several terms in the United States House of Representatives. Mrs. Candler, whose maiden name was Eliza Murphey, was the only child of Charles Murphey. The couple's first born child was named after his grandfather, as Charles Murphy Candler. Candler, like his grandfather, went on to serve in both the House and the Senate of the Georgia General Assembly.

U.S. House of Representatives
Preceded by Hugh A. Haralson	Member of the U.S. House of Representatives from Georgia's 4th congressional district March 4, 1851 – March 3, 1853	Succeeded by William Barton Wade Dent
