= Holmes, Kentucky =

Unincorporated community in Kentucky, United States

Holmes
- Unincorporated community
- Location within the state of Kentucky Holmes (the United States)
- Coordinates: 37°12′27″N 85°16′11″W
- Country: United States
- State: Kentucky
- County: Adair
- Elevation: 853 ft (260 m)
- Time zone: UTC-6 (Central (CST))
  - Summer (DST): UTC-5 (CDT)
- GNIS feature ID: 508268

Holmes is an unincorporated community in Adair County, Kentucky, United States. Its elevation is 853 feet (260 m).
