= Sparksville, Kentucky =

Unincorporated community in Kentucky, United States

Sparksville
- Unincorporated community
- Location within the state of Kentucky Sparksville (the United States)
- Coordinates: 37°0′30″N 85°24′7″W
- Country: United States
- State: Kentucky
- County: Adair
- Elevation: 1,102 ft (336 m)
- Time zone: UTC-6 (Central (CST))
  - Summer (DST): UTC-5 (CDT)
- GNIS feature ID: 509102

Sparksville is an unincorporated community in Adair County, Kentucky, United States. Its elevation is 1102 feet (336 m). The community is on Kentucky Route 61 at the east–west concurrency of KY 768.

== History ==
Its post office, which is no longer in operation, was named for Charles Weed Sparks, who is said to have established it on August 11, 1884; Sparks was later to establish and give his middle name to the nearby hamlet of Weed.
