= Yuma (name) =

- Pronunciation: [juma]
- Gender: Unisex, predominantly male

Origin
- Origin: Japanese; Atayal
- Meaning: Japanese: Depends on the kanji used
- Region of origin: Japan; Atayal

Yuma (ゆま, ユマ) and Yūma/Yuuma (ゆうま, ユーマ) are separate Japanese given names used for females or males, though they can be romanized the same way when vowel length is not transliterated.

Possible spellings of Yuma include ゆま, 夢真, and 悠麻.

Possible spellings of Yūma include 優馬, 勇真, 雄磨, 佑磨, 雄真, 祐真, 優真, 有真, 祐馬, 雄馬, and 遊馬.

== Notable people named Yuma ==
- Yuma Asami (麻美 ゆま) (born 1987), Japanese actress
- Yuma Mori (森 夢真) (born 2001), Japanese footballer
- Yuma Yamazaki (山崎 悠麻) (born 1988), Japanese para-badminton player
- Yuma (footballer), born Javier Monsálvez Carazo, Spanish footballer

== Notable people named Yūma ==
- Yuma Aoyagi (青柳 優馬) (born 1995), Japanese professional wrestler
- Yuma Edo (born 1993), Japanese swimmer
- Yuma Funabashi (船橋 勇真) (born 1997), Japanese footballer
- Yuma Hattori (服部 勇馬) (born 1993), Japanese long-distance runner
- Yuma Hiroki (廣木 雄磨) (born 1992), Japanese footballer
- Yuma Ishigaki (石垣 佑磨) (born 1982), Japanese actor
- Yuma Matsumoto (松本 雄真) (born 1999), Japanese footballer
- Yuma Mune (宗 佑磨) (born 1996), Japanese baseball player
- Yuma Murakami (born 1992), Japanese speed skater
- Yuma Nagai (永井 祐真) (born 1996), Japanese field hockey player
- Yuma Nakayama (中山 優馬) (born 1994), Japanese singer and actor
- Yuma Kagiyama (鍵山 優真) (born 2003), Japanese figure skater
- Yuma Kawamori (川森 有真) (born 1993), Japanese footballer
- Yūma Koishi (小石 祐馬) (born 1993), Japanese cyclist
- Yuma Yahagi (矢作 雄馬) (born 1990), Japanese motorcycle racer
- Yuma Obata (小畑 裕馬) (born 2001), Japanese footballer
- Yuma Oshima (大島 優磨) (born 1995), Japanese judoka
- Yūma Ohshita (大下 佑馬) (born 1992), Japanese baseball player
- Yuma Suzuki (鈴木 優磨) (born 1996), Japanese footballer
- Yuma Takahashi (高橋 悠馬) (born 1990), Japanese footballer
- Yuma Uchida (内田 雄馬) (born 1992), Japanese voice actor and singer
- Masaya Yuma (遊馬 将也) (born 1993), Japanese footballer

== Fictional characters ==
- Yuma (尤瑪), an Atayalic character in the Taiwanese television film Batu The Iron Fist (鐵拳巴圖).
- Yuma Chitose, in the manga Puella Magi Oriko Magica
- Yuma Hize, in Ultraman Arc
- Yuma Isogai, in Assassination Classroom
- Yuma Kagura, in Digimon World Data Squad
- Yuma Kokohead, the protagonist of Master Detective Archives: Rain Code
- Yuma Kosaka, in Gundam Build Fighters Try
- Yuma Lau, in Far Cry 4
- Yuma Tokoyogi, in Strike the Blood
- Yuma Tonami, in To Heart 2
- Yuma Tsukumo, in Yu-Gi-Oh! Zexal
