= Yuma, Kentucky =

Unincorporated community in Kentucky, United States

Yuma
- Unincorporated community
- Location within the state of Kentucky Yuma (the United States)
- Coordinates: 37°16′49″N 85°14′30″W
- Country: United States
- State: Kentucky
- County: Taylor
- Elevation: 722 ft (220 m)
- Time zone: UTC-5 (Eastern (EST))
  - Summer (DST): UTC-4 (EDT)
- GNIS feature ID: 509425

Yuma is an unincorporated community in Taylor County, Kentucky, United States. It lies along Route 76 southeast of the city of Campbellsville, the county seat of Taylor County. Its elevation is 722 feet (220 m).
