= Newnan Times-Herald =

Newspaper in Newnan, Georgia

Coordinates: 33.3761°N 84.7998°W

The Times-Herald
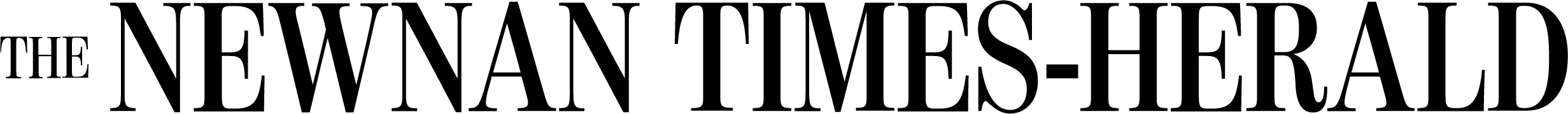
- Type: Weekly newspaper
- Format: Broadsheet
- Owner: The Newnan Times-Herald Inc.
- Founder(s): J. S. Bigby, Jesse Calaway Wootten
- Publisher: C. Clayton and Elizabeth Neely
- Editor: C. Clayton Neely
- Founded: 1865 (as The Newnan Herald)
- Language: English
- Headquarters: 16 Jefferson St. Newnan, GA 30264; United States
- Circulation: 8,996 (as of 2013)
- ISSN: 0883-2536
- Website: times-herald.com

The Newnan Times-Herald, locally known as The Times-Herald, is a newspaper published in Newnan, Georgia.

== History ==
The paper was founded in 1865, which makes it the oldest news organization in Newnan and Coweta County, Georgia. It is a local newspaper and official legal organ for the community located about 30 miles south of Atlanta. On July 22, 1972, the Newnan Times-Herald received the National Newspaper Association award for "excellence in typography".
