= 3:10 to Yuma =

3:10 to Yuma may refer to:

- "Three-Ten to Yuma", a 1953 Western short story by Elmore Leonard, adapted into
  - 3:10 to Yuma (1957 film), directed by Delmer Daves and starring Glenn Ford and Van Heflin
    - "The 3:10 to Yuma" (song), the film's theme song by George Duning and Ned Washington, recorded by Frankie Laine
  - 3:10 to Yuma (2007 film), a remake of the 1957 film, directed by James Mangold and starring Russell Crowe and Christian Bale
