= Green River Lake =

- Location within Kentucky
- Location: Adair / Taylor / Casey counties, Kentucky, United States
- Coordinates: 37°15′08″N 85°19′51″W
- Type: reservoir
- Primary inflows: Green River
- Primary outflows: Green River
- Basin countries: United States
- Surface area: 8,200 acres (33 km^{2})
- Surface elevation: 663 ft (202 m)

Green River Lake is a 8,210-acre (33 km^{2}) reservoir in Adair, Taylor, and Casey counties in Kentucky lying in the section of Kentucky known as the Highland Rim.

The lake was developed by the United States Army Corps of Engineers in 1969 by impounding the Green River. The dam is an 11 miles (18 km) drive equidistant from the cities of Campbellsville and Columbia. The lake is located 90 miles southeast of Louisville.

Operated and maintained primarily for flood control, the lake has become the major attraction of Green River Lake State Park.

== Green River Lake Dam ==
The earthen dam (National ID # KY03007, at 37.246°N 85.340°W), owned and operated by the Corps of Engineers, stands 144 feet (44 m) high, with a length of 2,350 feet (720 m) at its crest. Its riverine reservoir has a normal surface area of 12.8 square miles (33 km^{2}), a maximum capacity of 723200 acre-feet (892100000 m^{3}), and normal storage of 244100 acre-feet (301100000 m^{3}). The US$33.4 million construction cost of the Green River Lake Project was authorized by the Flood Control Act of 1938.

Green River Lake is the largest project in the Louisville District—counting both the land and water acreage (33,793 acres). The Green River is the longest river, at 370 miles (600 km), to flow completely within the Commonwealth of Kentucky's borders. Green River Lake also is home to the first Interpretative Center, opened in 1972, in the Louisville Engineer District.

== Benefits of the Lake ==
According to the US Army Corps of Engineers website: "Green River Lake has prevented over $123.39 million in flood damages since impoundment, and in fiscal year 2008 alone the lake generated approximately $34.75 million in visitor expenditures. In addition to flood protection and recreation, Corps lakes provide immeasurable benefits to the local economy.

Prior records:

- FY2008 (Flood Damages prevention - $123.39 million (total to date); Visitor Expenditures - 34.75 million)
- FY2007 (Flood Damages prevention - $116.9 million (total to date))
- FY2006 (Flood Damages prevention - $116.5 million (total to date); Visitor Expenditures - 34.6 million)
- FY2004 (Flood Damages prevention - 109.2 million (total to date); Visitor Expenditures - 33.0 million)
- FY2003 (Flood Damages prevention - 101.9 million (total to date); Visitor Expenditures - 30.3 million)
- FY2002 (Visitor Expenditures - 30.2 million)

Under former Mayor Robert L. Miller, Campbellsville developed a water line from Green River Lake to serve the city, the seat of Taylor County.

== See also ==
- Green River Lake State Park
