= Elk Horn, Kentucky =

Unincorporated community in Kentucky, United States

Elk Horn
- Unincorporated community
- Location within the state of Kentucky Elk Horn (the United States)
- Coordinates: 37°18′59″N 85°17′7″W
- Country: United States
- State: Kentucky
- County: Taylor
- Elevation: 735 ft (224 m)
- Time zone: UTC-5 (Eastern (EST))
  - Summer (DST): UTC-4 (EDT)
- ZIP codes: 42733
- GNIS feature ID: 507921

Elk Horn is an unincorporated community in Taylor County, Kentucky, United States. It lies along Route 76 southeast of the city of Campbellsville, the county seat of Taylor County. Its elevation is 735 feet (224 m). It has a post office with the ZIP code 42733.

A post office in the community was established in 1876. The origins of the name Elk Horn are unclear: it may be named for a large collection of elk horns displayed at the local mill, or for a pair of antlers found in the area and thought to be unusual. R.S & Amanda Tate was granted 2000 acres to set up a homestead in the early 1700s; at that time, it was still a part of Greensburg KY.
