= Garlin (surname) =

Garlin is a surname. Notable people with the surname include:

- Anna Garlin Spencer (1851–1931), American educator, feminist, and Unitarian minister
- Bunji Garlin, also known as Ian Antonio Alvarez soca artist from Trinidad and Tobago
- Jeff Garlin, actor and comedian
- Sender Garlin, American Communist writer
- Tammie Garlin, the victim in the Garlin case
