= Rheber, Kentucky =

- Unincorporated community
- Location within Kentucky
- Coordinates: 37°15′33″N 85°01′19″W
- Country: United States
- State: Kentucky
- County: Casey
- Elevation: 1,060 ft (320 m)
- Time zone: UTC-6 (Central (CST))
  - Summer (DST): UTC-5 (CDT)
- Area code: 606
- GNIS feature ID: 508928

Rheber is an unincorporated community in Casey County, Kentucky, United States.
