= Hugh A. Haralson =

American politician (1805–1854)

Member of the U.S. House of Representatives from Georgia
- In office March 4, 1843 – March 3, 1851
- Preceded by: George W. Crawford (AL); District established (4th)
- Succeeded by: District eliminated (AL); Charles Murphey (4th)
- Constituency: At-large district (1843-45); 4th district (1845-51)

Member of the Georgia Senate
- In office 1837–1838

Member of the Georgia House of Representatives
- In office 1831–1832

Personal details
- Born: Hugh A. Haralson; November 13, 1805 Greene County, Georgia, U.S.
- Died: September 25, 1854 (aged 48) LaGrange, Georgia, U.S.
- Party: Whig – prior to 1839; Democratic – 1839–1854
- Education: University of Georgia
- Profession: farmer and attorney

Military service
- Allegiance: United States of America
- Branch/service: Georgia Militia 9th Division
- Years of service: 1838–42
- Rank: Major General
- Commands: 9th Georgia Militia

Hugh Anderson Haralson (November 13, 1805 – September 25, 1854) was an American farmer, lawyer and politician based in Lagrange, Georgia.

== Early years and education ==
Hugh Haralson was born November 13, 1805, in Greene County, Georgia. He graduated from Franklin College of Arts and Sciences (University of Georgia). After graduation, Haralson was admitted to the bar by way of a special act of the Legislature, because he was under the age of twenty-one.

== Political and military careers ==
Haralson first served in the Georgia House of Representatives, at age 26, from 1831 to 1832. He was next elected to the Georgia State Senate in 1836, and served from 1837 to 1838. He was commissioned as a major general in the Georgia Militia, 9th Division, in 1838. Haralson was originally a member of the Whig Party, but left when that party advocated for a restoration of the Bank of the United States, something that Haralson was opposed to because of his Jeffersonian leanings. Haralson subsequently joined the Democratic Party and stood for election to Congress under that banner. Despite the fact that Georgia voted overwhelmingly for the Whig party, in 1840, Haralson was elected as a Democrat two years later. Haralson represented Georgia in the U.S. Congress from 1843 to 1851, where he was chairman of the Committee on Military Affairs during the Mexican–American War. He was the father-in-law of the famous Confederate General, and Georgia governor John B. Gordon.

== Death and legacy ==
Hugh A. Haralson died September 25, 1854, in LaGrange, Georgia. Haralson County, Georgia and the city of Haralson, Georgia in Coweta County, are named in his honor.

U.S. House of Representatives
Preceded by George Walker Crawford	Member of the U.S. House of Representatives from Georgia's at-large congressional district March 4, 1843 – March 3, 1845	Succeeded by Representatives elected by district
Preceded by Representatives elected at large	Member of the U.S. House of Representatives from Georgia's 4th congressional district March 4, 1845 – March 3, 1851	Succeeded by Charles Murphey
