= USS Asher J. Hudson =

Minesweeper of the United States Navy

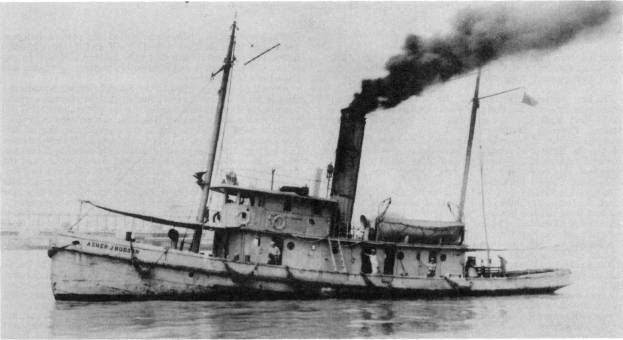
- USS Asher J. Hudson

History

United States
- Name: USS Asher J. Hudson
- Builder: Dialogue & Company, Camden, New Jersey
- Completed: 1891
- Commissioned: 1 August 1918
- Decommissioned: 30 March 1921
- Stricken: 5 August 1921
- Fate: Sold, 5 August 1921

General characteristics
- Type: Patrol boat
- Displacement: 136 long tons (138 t)
- Length: 92 ft (28 m)
- Beam: 21 ft (6.4 m)
- Draft: 10 ft 3 in (3.12 m)
- Speed: 11 knots (20 km/h; 13 mph)
- Complement: 17
- Armament: 2 × 3-pounder guns; 1 × .machine gun

USS Asher J. Hudson (SP-3104), later renamed Yuma, was completed in 1891 at Camden, New Jersey, by John H. Dialogue and Sons, inspected in the 8th Naval District on 1 July 1918 and, on the 24th, was ordered taken over by the Navy. Accordingly, acquired from the Alabama Coal Transport Co. of New Orleans, Louisiana, Asher J. Hudson, classified as SP-3104, was commissioned at the Naval Station, New Orleans, on 1 August 1918, Ensign Alva Carlton, USNRF, in command.

== Service history ==
=== World War I, 1918 ===
The tug stood downriver from New Orleans on the following afternoon and reached her assigned section base at Burrwood, Louisiana, on the morning of the 3rd. That afternoon, she tried out her recently installed minesweeping gear and, on the 5th, swept the approaches to the southwest pass of the Mississippi River, in company with Barnett (SP-1149). During the remainder of August, Asher J. Hudson conducted five sweeps, in company with Barnett, of the important passes of the shipping lanes leading to the "Father of Waters".

Asher J. Hudson maintained this routine of sweeping and patrol operations through the armistice of 11 November 1918 that stilted the guns of World War I, interspersing her active periods with upkeep at the section base of Burrwood or the naval station at New Orleans. Detached from the "minesweeping flotilla" of the 8th Naval District on 6 December 1918, Asher J. Hudson was relegated to the simple duties of a district tug.

=== Post-war activities, 1919–1921 ===
Records indicate that the vessel was reclassified as YT-37 on 17 July 1920 during the fleet-wide assignment of alphanumeric hull designations, and sank on 28 October 1920 from an undetermined cause while alongside a pier at the naval station at New Orleans. Although she was raised later and renamed Yuma on 24 November 1920, she apparently never resumed active service.

=== Decommissioning and sale ===
Listed as decommissioned on 30 March 1921, Yuma was sold to the Crown Coal and Towing Co., New Orleans, on 5 August 1921. Her name was simultaneously struck from the Navy List. Reverting to her original name, Asher J. Hudson, the tug performed towing services for another three decades, first with the Crown Coal and Towing Co., and later with the Sabine Towing Co., of Port Arthur, Texas. Her name disappeared from merchant registers about 1963.
