= Yuma (YTM-748) =

Tugboat of the United States Navy

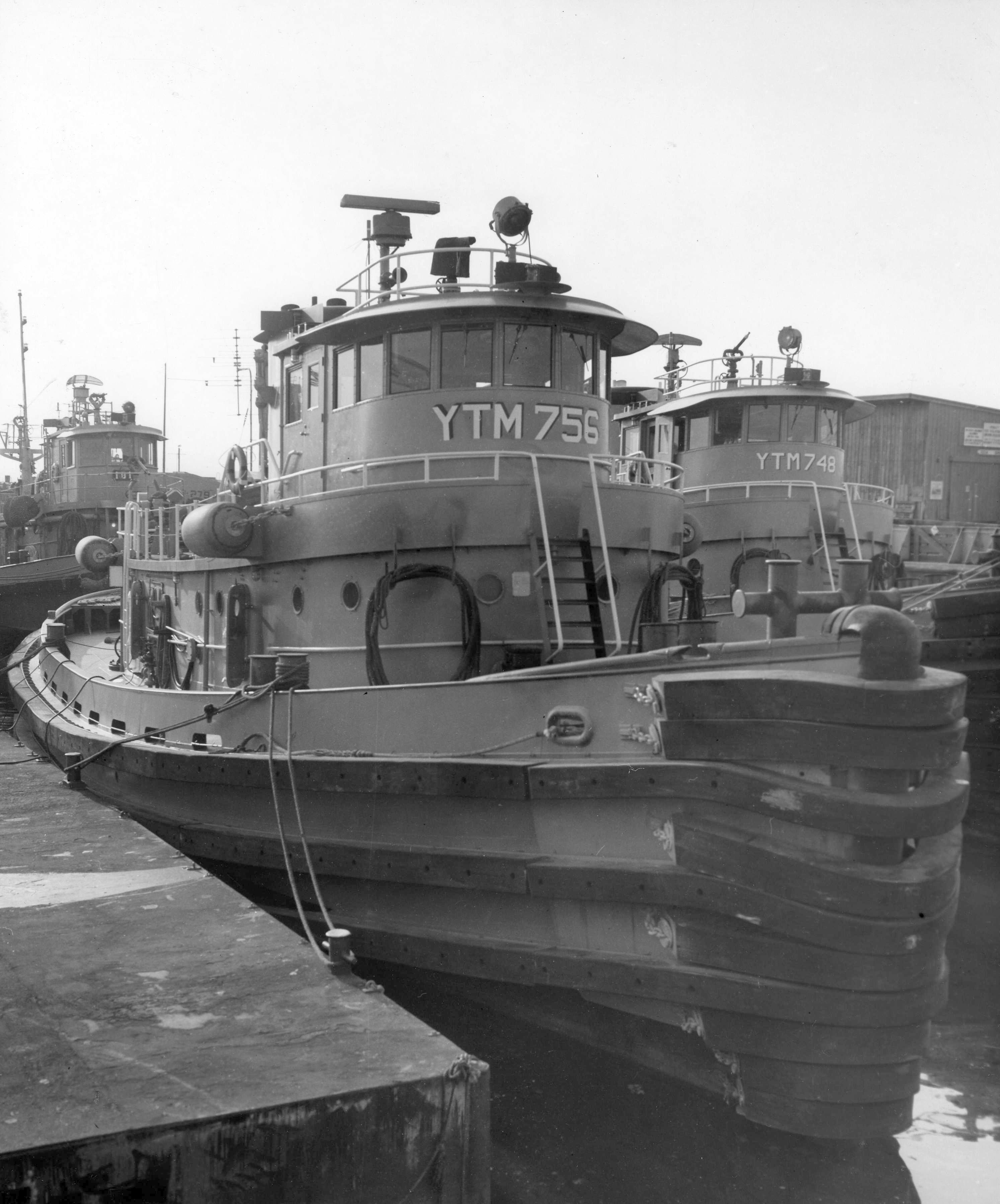

History

United States
- Name: LT-2078 (1952–1964); Yuma (1964–1980); LT-2078 (1980); Delaware (1980–1989); Mobile Point (1989–1995); Delaware (1995–2008); Mobile Point (2008–2009); Lesli M (2009–2012); Taurus (2012–2017); Nels J (2017–)
- Namesake: The Yuma, a Native American people
- Owner: US Army (1952–1964); US Navy (1964–1980); US Army (1980); Hvide Marine Incorporated (1980–1995); Sanders Towboat Company (1995–2008); SeaBulk Towing Services Incorporated (2008–2009); True North Marine Incorporated (2009–2012); Fournier Towing and Ship Service (2012–2017); Heritage Marine Incorporated (2017–)
- Builder: National Steel and Shipbuilding Company (NASSCO), San Diego, California
- Completed: 1954
- Acquired: September 1964
- In service: September 1964
- Out of service: August 1976
- Identification: MMSI number: 367789620; Callsign: WDJ5618
- Status: In commercial service

General characteristics
- Class & type: Chicopee class
- Type: Medium harbor tug
- Tonnage: 129 tons gross
- Displacement: 310 tons (full)
- Length: 107 ft (33 m)
- Beam: 27 ft (8.2 m)
- Draft: 12 ft (3.7 m)
- Speed: 12 knots
- Complement: 16

The third USS Yuma (YTM-748) was a medium harbor tug that served in the United States Navy from 1964 to 1976.

Yuma was built at San Diego, California, by National Steel and Shipbuilding Company (NASSCO), for the United States Army, which took delivery of her in 1954, and designated her "large tug" LT-2078. The U.S. Navy acquired LT-2078 from the Army in September 1964. The Navy classified her as a medium harbor tug, designated her YTM-748, and named her Yuma.

Yuma was assigned to the 12th Naval District and served as a harbor tug at San Francisco, California, until placed out of service in August 1976. She was then assigned to the Pacific Reserve Fleet and berthed at Bremerton, Washington. She was sold into commercial service.
