= Garlin case =

2007 murder and abuse case in Florida and Wisconsin

The Garlin case refers to the murder of Tammie Garlin and the earlier physical abuse of Garlin's 11-year-old son on June 4, 2007, by their roommate Candace Clark, Clark's boyfriend Michael Sisk, and Garlin's girlfriend Michaela Clerc. Garlin's 15-year-old daughter, Felicia Mae, was tried as a juvenile for being a willing participant in her mother's murder and the abuse of her brother. The case drew attention to blind spots in the U.S. state of Florida's child-protection system.

== Abuse allegations ==
Law-enforcement officers in Portage, Wisconsin, became aware of the situation on June 15, 2007, when following up on a Lake County, Florida, warrant for Candace Clark, who was charged with unlawfully removing her 2-year-old daughter, Courtney Clark, from the foster-care custody of Michaela Clerc's parents. While local media routinely reported on the process, national media began coverage when four individuals were arraigned by video hookup in Columbia County (WI) Circuit Court on July 20. By the next day, international news agencies had picked up the story.

When the police approached the house, the door was answered by Clark. Allegedly providing an alias, she denied that Michael Sisk resided there. The officers consulted photographs and, since the woman resembled Clark and a photograph resembled the 3-year-old in question, further inquiry was made of the household. Clark eventually admitted that the child in question was known by two names.

Fifteen-year-old Felicia Garlin, who also provided an alias, was interviewed, and said her mother was unavailable. Michaela Clerc was also questioned by the officers. When it became clear that the women were lying about their identities and there was reasonable cause to suspect that the child in question was the one abducted from Florida, the four individuals were taken to the Portage police station.

Clark's two other young daughters, a 1-year-old and a 3-month-old, whom police placed in protective custody, were also residing at the house. The Florida complaint indicated that Sisk was the father of the two younger girls. A WTMJ-TV story suggested that the youngest child may have been Felicia Garlin's, and indicated that Felicia's brother and the three small children would remain in the custody of the Wisconsin child-protection system. The head of the Florida child-protection system, Robert Butterworth, said "We are asking the Pinellas judge to relinquish jurisdiction in Florida and let them [i.e., the Wisconsin authorities] take care of the case."

At the police station, Clerc indicated that an 11-year-old boy who had been burned would be found at the house. The boy, identified by the initials "ACG", was found in a closet. Page 12 of the complaint states:

ACG, DOB 10/13/1995. ACG was sitting on the floor of an upstairs bedroom closet with his knees pulled up to his chest. ACG had obvious wounds all over his body. ACG started crying when he saw the officers and said that he did not want to go to jail.

The Garlin boy was taken to Divine Savior Hospital and eventually transferred to the University of Wisconsin Hospital in Madison. At the UW hospital, he was diagnosed with extensive injuries. Pages 12–13 of the complaint state:

Dr. Knox reports that ACG was admitted to the UW Emergency Department and then to Dr. Knox's care. The physical examination of ACG showed the following: overall– grossly burned with significant new and old injuries from serial beatings and malnourishment. Specifically, ACG had a large ulcerated area on the top of his scalp, multiple cutaneous injuries around the rest of his scalp, a front that upper tooth missing, several other burn marks on his face and scalp, multiple burn and loop marks (from reported extension cord beatings) throughout his torso, burns on both his hands which had caused mummification and significant contracture of some of the fingers, burnt and swollen arms, burn scars on his legs and knees, extensive burns on both feet. Dr. Knox also reports that some parts of the physical exam could not be completed because ACG's injuries caused him too much discomfort for these portions of the exam. Dr. Knox also reports that ACG showed absence of significant muscle mass. ACG was unable to walk because of the extensive burns on his feet. The radiology exam of ACG showed abnormalities, likely due to dehydration.

Dr. Knox diagnosed ACG as having the following: 1) definite physical abuse, 2) serial torture of a child, 3) profound malnutrition, 4) chronic medical neglect, 5) educational neglect and 6) great mental harm to a child.

The police questioned Clerc, who admitted that the:

...young children were Candace's children. She also said that the abducted child from Florida was one of the children. Clerc admitted that she helped "punish" ACG with the scalding water and held the bathroom door shut while others were scalding ACG because Ms. Clark and Mr. Sisk did not want the babies to be hurt by the hot water. Ms. Clark also admitted that she had hogtied ACG as punishment.(p.13)

== Murder ==
Authorities determined that Garlin's cause of death was murder. According to page 14 of the complaint, the following statements detailed the murder of Tammie Garlin:

Ms. Clark was also able to determine that Tammie Garlin died on June 4, 2007. She said this would have been early morning, shortly before daybreak. She said that earlier in the day Felicia had kicked Tammie. Tammie was not feeling well after that time. Michaela also kicked Tammie. Felicia and Michaela had to carry Tammie down to the bathroom. Michaela dropped Tammie's head when they got into the bathroom and Tammie's head hit the floor. Felicia also "smacked" Tammie "hard" while they were in the bathroom. Felicia and Michaela put Tammie in the bathtub fully clothed and washed her off because she had soiled herself. Tammie was then put on the floor of the bathroom, but she wasn't moving. Ms. Clerc kicked Tammie and told her to "get off the damn floor." Mr. Sisk went into the bathroom and shut the door. He came out a few minutes later and said something to the effect of "She's dead." Michaela laughed.

Fifteen-year-old Felicia Garlin admitted helping with the burial of her mother; preparations were made during the day for burial after dark in the backyard. 10 days later, a search warrant was obtained, and Tammie Garlin's remains were exhumed. An autopsy was performed June 16, which "determined that the probable cause of Ms. Garlin's death was manual strangulation".

Sisk was not at the residence. A detective acquired a cell phone number and called him, telling him he was wanted for questioning. Sisk left town, and police issued a bulletin for his arrest.

At the time he was arrested in Milwaukee on June 15, 2007, Mr. Sisk was on a bus that was heading to Chicago, Illinois. Mr. Sisk also had in his possession a bus ticket that had been purchased on June 15, 2007, at 10:40 a.m. in Wisconsin Dells, Wisconsin. This ticket had the ultimate destination of Madisonville, Kentucky.

== Florida ripple effect ==
The unlawful removal of the 2-year-old from her foster home reflected poorly on the Florida child-protection system. Martin E. Comas said in the Orlando Sentinel that it took Florida child-custody authorities four months to inform law enforcement:

Lake County sheriff's officials also said they were baffled as to why a caseworker with the Safe Children Coalition in Pinellas County did not report Courtney missing until Jan. 25, more than four months after she was snatched from her Sorrento foster home by her mother, Candace L. Clark.

Carol Marbin Miller (in the June 22 Miami Herald) indicated that former Florida Attorney General Robert Butterworth, six months into a stint as Secretary of the Department of Children and Families, was mystified that such a thing could happen and declined to place blame until an investigation was completed. Butterworth held a news conference on June 26, where he announced changes in the system.

Another Herald article followed up with more details on June 23. The St. Petersburg Times published a longer analysis of the system's failure June 24. Stacy Scarborough, Clark's sister, was reported to have sought custody of her nieces a year before the events under discussion; authorities were non-communicative, and failed to report to her that the 2-year-old had been unlawfully removed from foster care. Scarborough would face "a myriad of legal hurdles if she hopes to get custody of her nieces". since the custody was now an interstate issue, it would take three to six months of legal effort.

The four suspects reportedly constituted an identity theft ring masterminded by Clark, who (with Sisk) had outstanding warrants in Colorado and her home state, Kentucky. Arguing that Clark, not Sisk, was the gang leader, one article quotes a former neighbor who characterized Sisk as "dumber than a sack of hammers", and insinuated that Clark was the controlling figure in the household.

Clark was the only member of the group willing to grant interviews, speaking to Sarah Langbein of the Orlando Sentinel while in jail. Published June 22, 2007, Clark maintained that Sisk controlled the gang. She termed ACG "difficult" and stated that he required frequent discipline. In a June 23 article by Portage Daily Register writer Matthew Call, she again denied any role in the murder. As for her relationship with Sisk, Call wrote:

Clark said she met Sisk at a high school in Hopkins County, KY. They moved to Florida because "that was my dream place to always live," she said. Clark also said she met Clerc in a chat room.

== Charges ==
The Wisconsin charges included first-degree murder, abuse of a corpse, and child abuse. The complaint, dated 20 June 2007, made no mention of identity theft. All accused faced life imprisonment and an additional 100 years on the charges.

Jane E. Kohlwey, Columbia County, WI district attorney, was in charge of the case. Colorado, Florida, and Kentucky expressed an interest in trying the defendants. Since the combined cases were complex and involved multiple jurisdictions, Columbia County's small district attorney's office was under pressure. The Portage Daily Register voiced local concerns: "While a plea deal could be worked out that would reduce the expense to Columbia County taxpayers for four trials, a heavy workload still awaits police and prosecutors".

A preliminary hearing was scheduled for November 19–20, 2007 following an earlier hearing on November 6 concerning videotaped evidence.

== Sentencing ==
Prosecutors discounted evidence and testimony that Clark was the gang leader, contending instead that Sisk must have controlled the group and filing extra charges against him. The prosecution appeared to discount the role of Clerc, whose lesbian relationship with Garlin triggered the torture and homicide. Judge Alan White followed the prosecution's lead, imposing the following sentences on September 9, 2008:

Michael Sisk

The male defendant was sentenced to a minimum of 58 years in prison:

1. Second-degree reckless homicide (Alford plea): 15 years' imprisonment, 10 years' extended supervision consecutive with all counts
2. Hiding a corpse (guilty plea): 5 years' imprisonment, 5 years' extended supervision served consecutively
3. False imprisonment (no contest plea): 2 years' imprisonment, 2 years' extended supervision served consecutively
4. Aggravated battery (no contest plea): 5 years' imprisonment, 5 years' extended supervision served consecutively
5. Mayhem (guilty plea): 25 years' imprisonment, 15 years' extended supervision served consecutively
6. Child enticement, intentionally causing great harm (guilty plea): 3 years' imprisonment, 5 years' extended supervision served consecutively
7. Causing mental harm to a child (guilty plea): 3 years' imprisonment, 5 years' extended supervision served consecutively
8. False imprisonment (guilty plea): 3 years' imprisonment, 3 years' extended supervision served consecutively
9. Intentionally contributing to the delinquency of a minor (no contest plea): 2 years' imprisonment, 2 years' extended supervision served consecutively
10. Obstructing an officer (no contest plea): 9 months' imprisonment served consecutively

Candace Clark

The ringleader was sentenced to at least 47 years in prison:

1. Second-degree reckless homicide (no contest plea): 15 years' imprisonment, 10 years' extended supervision consecutive with all counts
2. Mayhem (guilty plea): 25 years' imprisonment, 15 years' extended supervision served consecutively
3. Child enticement (guilty plea): 5 years' imprisonment, 5 years' extended supervision served consecutively
4. Physical abuse of a child (guilty plea): 10 years' imprisonment, 5 years' extended supervision served concurrently
5. Mental harm to a child (guilty plea): 4 years' imprisonment, 4 years' extended supervision served consecutively
6. False imprisonment (guilty plea): 3 years' imprisonment, 3 years' extended supervision served consecutively
7. Causing delinquency of a minor (no contest plea): 3 years' imprisonment, 3 years' extended supervision served consecutively

Michaela Clerc

The lover of the homicide victim was sentenced to 37 years in prison:

1. Mayhem (no contest plea): 25 years' imprisonment, 15 years' extended supervision consecutive with all counts
2. Physical abuse of a child (no contest plea): 7 years' imprisonment, 5 years' extended supervision served consecutively
3. Mental harm to a child (no contest plea): 5 years' imprisonment, 5 years' extended supervision served consecutively
4. False imprisonment (no contest plea): 3 years' imprisonment, 3 years' extended supervision served concurrently

Felicia Mae Garlin

Initially charged as an adult, Felicia Garlin faced charges similar to the others. Under pressure from concerns that Garlin had been under duress following the murder of her mother by Clark and Clerc, the court transferred the then 16-year-old to the juvenile division. There, court records remain sealed.

== Primary sources ==
- Criminal complaint (*.pdf)
- State of Wisconsin vs. Michael J. Sisk, Columbia County Case Number 2007CF000199
- State of Wisconsin vs. Felicia Mae Garlin, Columbia County Case Number 2007CF000198
- State of Wisconsin vs. Michaela Shawn Clerc, Columbia County Case Number 2007CF000197
- State of Wisconsin vs. Candace L. Clark, Columbia County Case Number 2007CF000196
