= Pellyton, Kentucky =

Unincorporated community in Kentucky, United States

Pellyton
- Unincorporated community
- Location within the state of Kentucky Pellyton (the United States)
- Coordinates: 37°12′42″N 85°5′3″W
- Country: United States
- State: Kentucky
- County: Adair
- Elevation: 741 ft (226 m)
- Time zone: UTC-6 (Central (CST))
  - Summer (DST): UTC-5 (CDT)
- ZIP codes: 42728
- GNIS feature ID: 508795

Pellyton is an unincorporated community in eastern Adair County, Kentucky, United States with an elevation of 741 feet (226 m). The community is on Kentucky Route 206.

== History ==
On April 16, 1998, an F3 tornado struck Pellyton, with most of its damage occurring in the area. More than a month later, on May 31, 1998, an F2 tornado touched down east of the community. A brick home was heavily damaged, while several mobile homes were destroyed. A third F1 tornado struck the area on January 2, 2006. This tornado damaged several homes.

Grand Army of the Republic post 193, Captain Bailey, was located in Pellyton.
