= Green River Lake State Park =

State park in Kentucky, United States

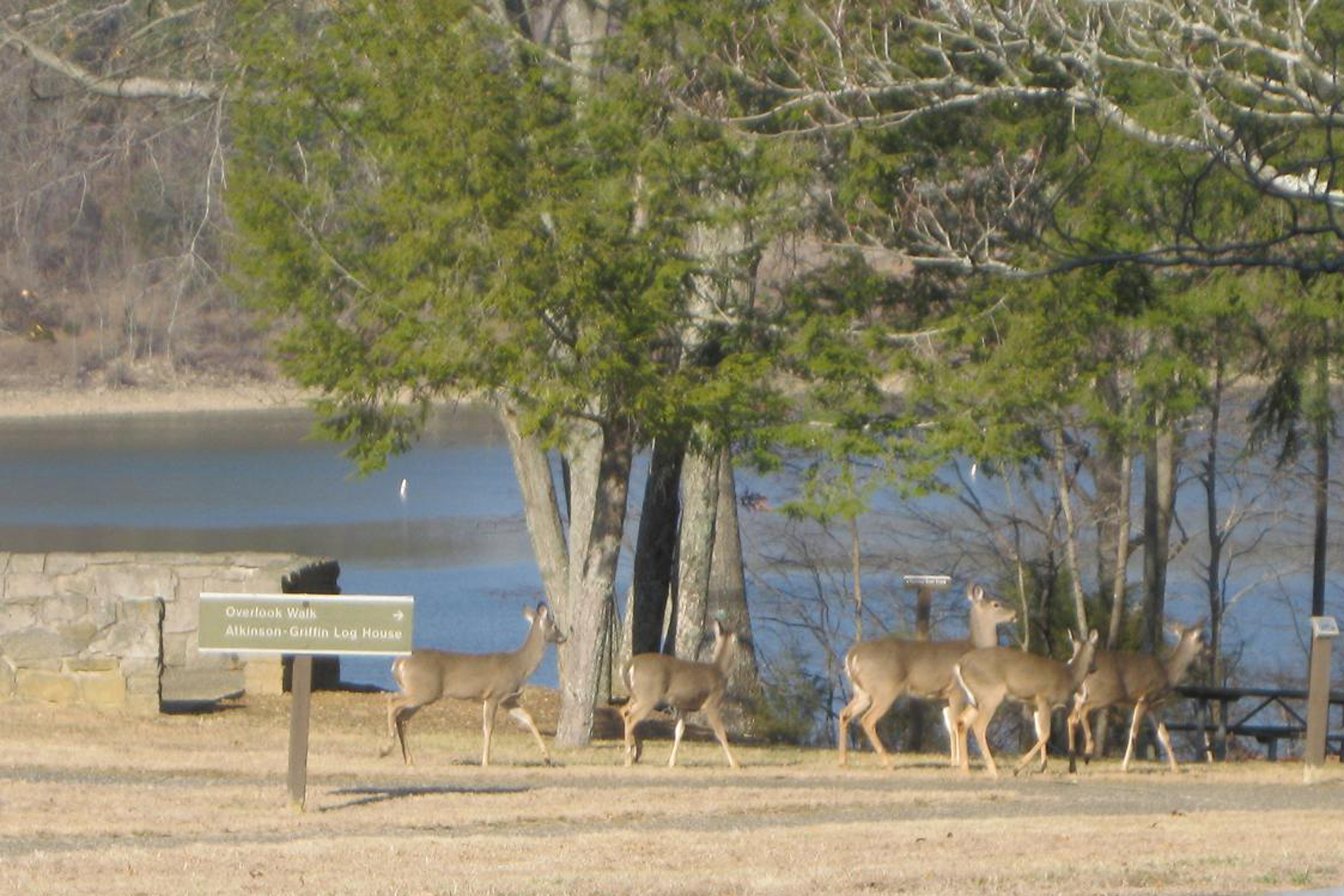
- White-tailed deer at Green River Lake State Park

- Location within Kentucky Location within the United States
- Type: Kentucky state park
- Location: Taylor County, Kentucky, United States
- Coordinates: 37°16′34″N 85°20′6″W
- Area: 1,331 acres (539 ha)
- Established: 1969
- Administrator: Kentucky Department of Parks
- Website: Official website

Green River Lake State Park is a public recreation area found four miles (6.4 km) south of Campbellsville in Taylor County, Kentucky. The park encompasses 1,331 acres (539 ha), while Green River Lake, its major feature, covers 8,200 acres (3,300 ha).

== History ==
The Army Corps of Engineers started construction of a dam in 1964 and Green River Lake State Park opened in 1969.

== Activities and amenities ==
The park has an 18-hole miniature golf course, hiking trails, beach, picnic areas, playgrounds, campgrounds and marina. The lake is populated with bass, bluegill, catfish, crappie, walleye, and muskie.
