= USNS Yuma (T-EPF-8) =

Spearhead-class expeditionary fast transport

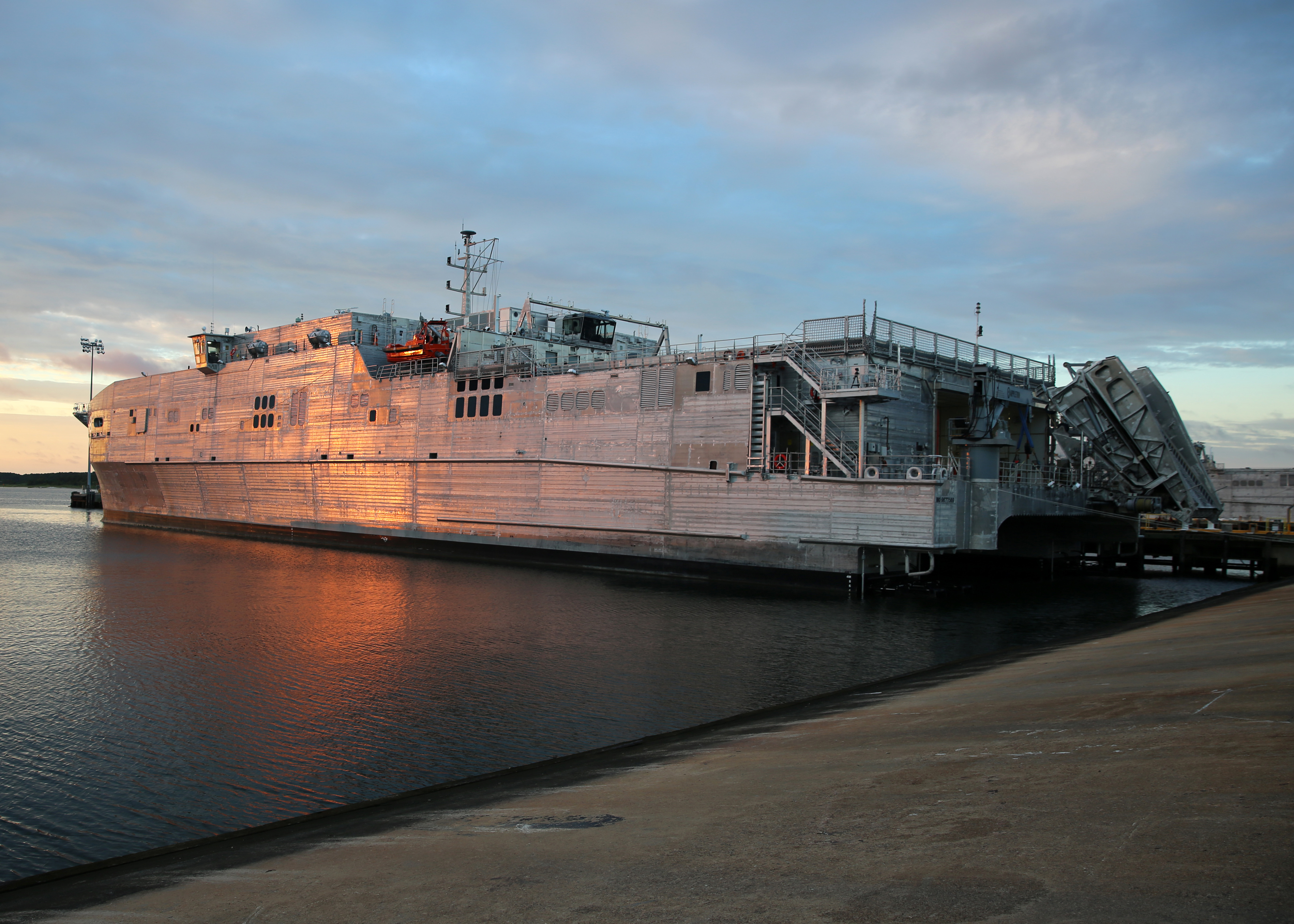
- USNS Yuma in Virginia Beach on 1 July 2017

History

United States
- Name: Yuma
- Namesake: Yuma
- Operator: Military Sealift Command
- Awarded: 24 February 2012
- Builder: Austal USA
- Laid down: 29 March 2016
- Launched: 17 September 2016
- Sponsored by: Janet Napolitano
- Christened: 20 August 2016
- In service: 21 April 2017
- Identification: IMO number: 9677569; MMSI number: 368886000; Callsign: NYMA; Hull number: T-EPF-8
- Motto: No Challenge Too Difficult
- Status: Active
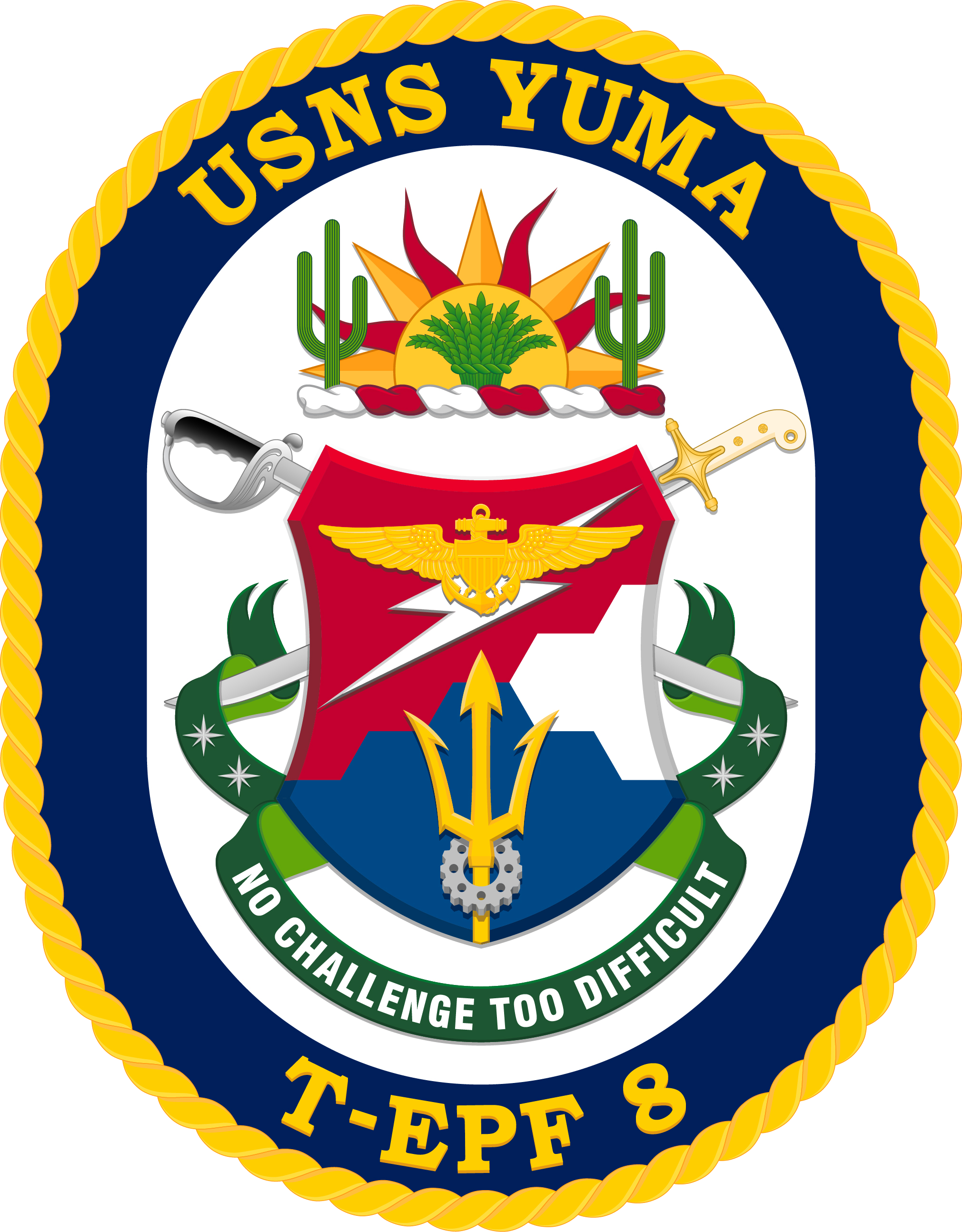
- Badge

General characteristics
- Class & type: Spearhead class expeditionary fast transport
- Length: 103.0 m (337 ft 11 in)
- Beam: 28.5 m (93 ft 6 in)
- Draft: 3.83 m (12 ft 7 in)
- Propulsion: 4 × MTU 20V8000 M71L diesel engines; 4 × ZF 60000NR2H reduction gears
- Speed: 43 knots (80 km/h; 49 mph)
- Troops: 312
- Crew: Capacity of 41, 22 in normal service
- Aviation facilities: Helipad

USNS Yuma (T-EPF-8) is the eighth Spearhead-class expeditionary fast transport and operated by the United States Navy's Military Sealift Command. It is the fourth ship in naval service named after Yuma, Arizona.

The ship was christened on 20 August 2016 by ship's sponsor Janet Napolitano and launched at Austal USA in Mobile, Alabama on 17 September 2016. The Yuma completed acceptance trials on 26 January 2017 and its delivery was accepted by the U.S. Navy on 21 April 2017.
