= Adair County, Kentucky =

County in Kentucky, United States

- County
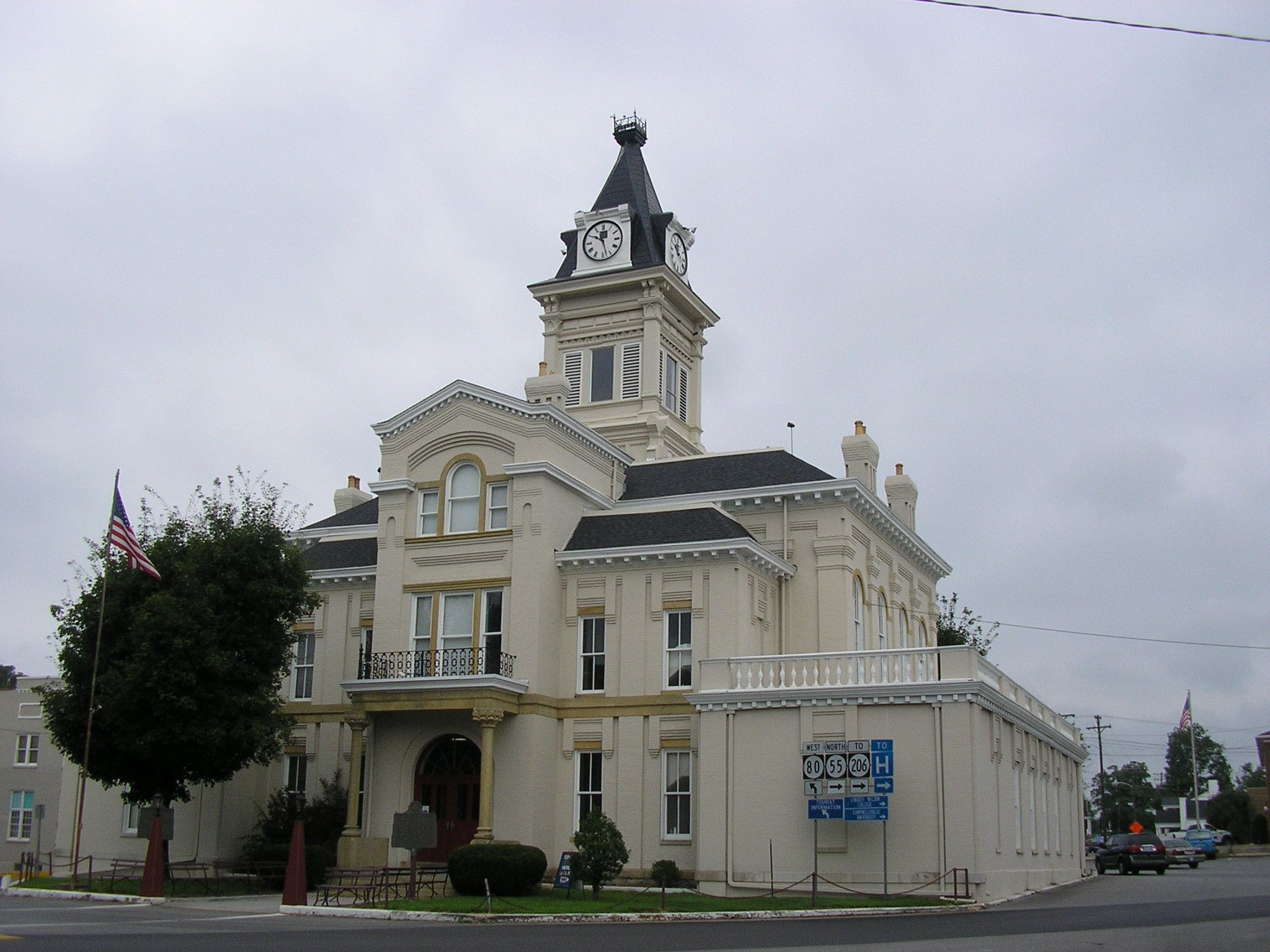
- Adair County Courthouse in Columbia

- Location within the U.S. state of Kentucky
- Coordinates: 37°07′N 85°17′W
- Country: United States
- State: Kentucky
- Founded: 1801
- Named for: John Adair
- Seat: Columbia
- Largest city: Columbia

Government
  - Judge/Executive: Larry Russell Bryant (R)

Area
  - Total: 412 sq mi (1,070 km^{2})
  - Land: 405 sq mi (1,050 km^{2})
  - Water: 7.1 sq mi (18 km^{2}) 1.7%

Population (2020)
  - Total: 18,903
  - Estimate (2025): 19,423 ▲
  - Density: 46.7/sq mi (18.0/km^{2})
- Time zone: UTC−6 (Central)
  - Summer (DST): UTC−5 (CDT)
- Congressional district: 1st
- Website: adaircounty.ky.gov

Adair County is a county located in the U.S. state of Kentucky. As of the 2020 census, the population was 18,903. Its county seat and only municipality is Columbia. The county was founded in 1801 and named for John Adair, then Speaker of the House in Kentucky and later Governor of Kentucky (1820–1824). Adair County has some of the few surviving American Chestnut trees in the United States.

== History ==
Adair County was formed on December 11, 1801, from sections of Green County. Columbia was chosen as the county seat the following year and the first courthouse was built in 1806.

The county was named in honor of John Adair, a veteran of the Revolutionary War and Northwest Indian War. Later he commanded Kentucky troops in the Battle of New Orleans. He served as the eighth Governor of Kentucky. This was the 44th of Kentucky's 120 counties to be organized.

After the American Civil War, a gang of five men, believed to include Frank and Jesse James from Missouri, robbed the Bank of Columbia of $600 on April 29, 1872. They killed the cashier, R.A.C. Martin, in the course of the robbery.

The courthouse on the Columbia town square, completed in 1884, replaced the original 1806 courthouse.

== Geography ==
According to the United States Census Bureau, the county has a total area of 412 square miles (1,070 km^{2}), of which 405 square miles (1,050 km^{2}) is land and 7.1 square miles (18 km^{2}) (1.7%) is water. It is part of the Pennyroyal Plateau region of Kentucky and is part of western Appalachia. Over 40% of the county's land is covered with timber.

The Green River is the county's major waterway but is not commercially navigable. The river was impounded to form Green River Lake, the major feature of Green River Lake State Park, which lies in Adair and Taylor counties.

=== Adjacent counties ===
- Taylor County – north (EST)
- Casey County – northeast (EST)
- Russell County – east
- Cumberland County – south
- Metcalfe County – southwest
- Green County – northwest

== Demographics ==
Historical population
Census	Pop.	Note	%±
1810	6,011		—
1820	8,765		45.8%
1830	8,217		−6.3%
1840	8,466		3.0%
1850	9,898		16.9%
1860	9,509		−3.9%
1870	11,065		16.4%
1880	13,078		18.2%
1890	13,721		4.9%
1900	14,888		8.5%
1910	16,503		10.8%
1920	17,289		4.8%
1930	16,401		−5.1%
1940	18,566		13.2%
1950	17,603		−5.2%
1960	14,699		−16.5%
1970	13,037		−11.3%
1980	15,233		16.8%
1990	15,360		0.8%
2000	17,244		12.3%
2010	18,656		8.2%
2020	18,903		1.3%
2025 (est.)	19,423	▲	2.8%
U.S. Decennial Census; 1790-1960 1900-1990; 1990-2000 2010-2020

=== 2020 census ===
As of the 2020 census, the county had a population of 18,903. The median age was 40.6 years. 21.4% of residents were under the age of 18 and 18.8% of residents were 65 years of age or older. For every 100 females there were 98.5 males, and for every 100 females age 18 and over there were 95.5 males age 18 and over.

The racial makeup of the county was 91.6% White, 2.8% Black or African American, 0.2% American Indian and Alaska Native, 0.3% Asian, 0.0% Native Hawaiian and Pacific Islander, 1.4% from some other race, and 3.6% from two or more races. Hispanic or Latino residents of any race comprised 3.4% of the population.

26.5% of residents lived in urban areas, while 73.5% lived in rural areas.

There were 7,364 households in the county, of which 27.9% had children under the age of 18 living with them and 25.2% had a female householder with no spouse or partner present. About 28.9% of all households were made up of individuals and 13.6% had someone living alone who was 65 years of age or older. There were 8,600 housing units, of which 14.4% were vacant. Among occupied housing units, 72.5% were owner-occupied and 27.5% were renter-occupied. The homeowner vacancy rate was 1.4% and the rental vacancy rate was 6.2%.

=== 2000 census ===
As of the census of 2000, there were 17,244 people, 6,747 households, and 4,803 families residing in the county. The population density was 42 per square mile (16/km^{2}). There were 7,792 housing units at an average density of 19 per square mile (7.3/km^{2}). The racial makeup of the county was 96.00% White, 2.55% Black or African American, 0.22% Native American, 0.26% Asian, 0.02% Pacific Islander, 0.19% from other races, and 0.76% from two or more races. 0.77% of the population were Hispanic or Latino of any race.

There were 6,747 households, out of which 31.50% had children under the age of 18 living with them, 57.60% were married couples living together, 10.20% had a female householder with no husband present, and 28.80% were non-families. 26.20% of all households were made up of individuals, and 13.00% had someone living alone who was 65 years of age or older. The average household size was 2.44 and the average family size was 2.93.

In the county, the population was spread out, with 23.50% under the age of 18, 10.70% from 18 to 24, 27.70% from 25 to 44, 23.40% from 45 to 64, and 14.60% who were 65 years of age or older. The median age was 37 years. For every 100 females there were 94.00 males. For every 100 females age 18 and over, there were 91.60 males.

The median income for a household in the county was $24,055, and the median income for a family was $29,779. Males had a median income of $23,183 versus $17,009 for females. The per capita income for the county was $14,931. About 18.20% of families and 24.00% of the population were below the poverty line, including 29.60% of those under age 18 and 21.70% of those age 65 or over.

== Economy ==
Adair County's agrarian economy produces livestock, dairy products, corn, and tobacco. The county experienced a minor oil boom in the 1960s.

Lack of adequate transportation infrastructure hindered the county's prosperity well into the 20th century. The completion of the east–west Cumberland Parkway in 1973 significantly ameliorated this problem, but since then the county has sought improved road access to the north.

== Education ==
The county is served by Adair County Schools.

Its schools are:

- Adair County Primary Center (Principal: Patty R. Jones; Asst. Principal: Laura H. Murrell)
- Adair County Elementary School (Principal: Steve Burton; Assistant Principal: Sommer Brown)
- Adair County Middle School (Principal: Alma Rich; Assistant Principal: Donna Young)
- Adair County High School (Principal: Troy Young; Assistant Principal: Doug Holmes).

== Politics ==
United States presidential election results for Adair County, Kentucky
Year	Republican		Democratic		Third party(ies)	
Year	No.	%	No.	%	No.	%
1912	786	24.43%	1,398	43.46%	1,033	32.11%
1916	1,863	52.43%	1,675	47.14%	15	0.42%
1920	3,526	56.28%	2,725	43.50%	14	0.22%
1924	2,757	53.40%	2,368	45.86%	38	0.74%
1928	3,856	69.01%	1,732	30.99%	0	0.00%
1932	3,084	48.59%	3,251	51.22%	12	0.19%
1936	3,371	55.72%	2,669	44.12%	10	0.17%
1940	3,674	57.42%	2,711	42.37%	13	0.20%
1944	3,414	58.39%	2,411	41.23%	22	0.38%
1948	2,839	55.79%	2,144	42.13%	106	2.08%
1952	3,737	63.05%	2,184	36.85%	6	0.10%
1956	4,157	62.50%	2,491	37.45%	3	0.05%
1960	4,621	67.07%	2,269	32.93%	0	0.00%
1964	3,052	51.49%	2,854	48.15%	21	0.35%
1968	3,239	59.43%	1,362	24.99%	849	15.58%
1972	3,859	69.77%	1,610	29.11%	62	1.12%
1976	3,201	56.82%	2,366	42.00%	67	1.19%
1980	4,051	63.12%	2,285	35.60%	82	1.28%
1984	4,500	70.93%	1,812	28.56%	32	0.50%
1988	4,346	71.09%	1,723	28.19%	44	0.72%
1992	3,740	58.22%	2,044	31.82%	640	9.96%
1996	3,876	59.28%	1,821	27.85%	841	12.86%
2000	5,460	74.51%	1,779	24.28%	89	1.21%
2004	5,628	75.57%	1,764	23.69%	55	0.74%
2008	5,512	75.53%	1,668	22.86%	118	1.62%
2012	5,841	76.86%	1,660	21.84%	99	1.30%
2016	6,637	80.61%	1,323	16.07%	273	3.32%
2020	7,276	82.98%	1,392	15.88%	100	1.14%
2024	7,643	85.17%	1,257	14.01%	74	0.82%

=== Elected officials ===
Elected officials as of January 3, 2025
U.S. House	James Comer (R)	KY 1
Ky. Senate	Max Wise (R)	16
Ky. House	Amy Neighbors (R)	21

=== Voter registration ===
Adair County Voter Registration & Party Enrollment as of February 17, 2020
Political Party	Total Voters	Percentage
Republican	9,431	68.91%
Democratic	3,414	24.95%
Others	433	3.16%
Independent	368	2.69%
Libertarian	31	0.23%
Green	7	0.05%
Constitution	1	0.01%
Total	13,685	100%

=== Statewide elections ===
Previous gubernatorial elections results
Year	Republican	Democratic	Third parties
2023	68.06% 3,597	31.94% 1,688	0.00% 0
2019	69.53% 3,946	28.65% 1,626	1.81% 103
2015	66.33% 2,727	30.84% 1,268	2.82% 116
2011	51.06% 1,877	43.69% 1,606	5.25% 193
2007	67.75% 3,138	32.25% 1,494	0.00% 0
2003	66.22% 3,085	33.78% 1,574	0.00% 0
1999	28.84% 663	62.68% 1,441	8.48% 195
1995	65.84% 2,951	34.09% 1,528	0.07% 3

== Communities ==
=== City ===
- Columbia

=== Unincorporated communities ===
Below is partial listing of known unincorporated communities within Adair County. A more complete listing is available here.

- Breeding
- Crocus (partially in Russell County)
- Glens Fork
- Gradyville
- Knifley
- Neatsville
- Pellyton
- Sparksville
- Cane Valley
- Coburg
- Holmes Bend
- Kellyville

== Notable residents ==
- Thomas E. Bramlette, Governor of Kentucky
- Robert Porter Caldwell (1821–1885), United States Congressman, was born in Adair County.
- E. A. Diddle, men's basketball coach for Western Kentucky University
- Janice Holt Giles (1909–1979), a writer noted particularly for her regional novels and nonfiction, lived in Adair County from 1949 until her death in 1979.
- James R. Hindman, Lieutenant Governor of Kentucky
- Sergeant Dakota Meyer (b. 1988), born and initially educated in Adair County, received the Medal of Honor in 2011 for his actions in Operation Enduring Freedom in Afghanistan in 2009
- Pinkney H. Walker, Chief Justice of the Illinois Supreme Court, was born in Adair County.
- Evelyn West, burlesque actress
- Frank Lane Wolford, U.S. Representative from Kentucky

== See also ==
- National Register of Historic Places listings in Adair County, Kentucky
- List of counties in Kentucky
