= Kentucky Route 255 =

State highway in Kentucky, United States

Kentucky Route 255
- KY 255 highlighted in red

Route information
- Maintained by KYTC
- Length: 16.977 mi (27.322 km)

Major junctions
- South end: KY 252 near Rocky Hill
- US 68 / KY 80 at Bon Ayr; US 31W in Park City; I-65 at Park City
- North end: KY 70 in Mammoth Cave National Park.

Location
- Country: United States
- State: Kentucky
- Counties: Barren, Edmonson

Highway system
- Kentucky State Highway System; Interstate; US; State; Parkways
← KY 254	→ KY 256

Kentucky Route 255 (KY 255) is a 16.977-mile-long (27.322 km) south-north state highway located in south central Kentucky. It provides access to Interstate 65 and Mammoth Cave National park to residents of southern Barren County.

== Route description ==
=== Rocky Hill to Park City ===
KY 255 begins at a junction with KY 252 in Barren County, near the Rocky Hill community. The route is narrow and considerably curvy until coming to a junction with KY 1297 about 3.3 miles (5.3 km) later. After this junction, the route straightens somewhat, proceeding north for another 3.1 miles (5.0 km) before coming to an intersection with the concurrently running US 68/KY 80 in the Bon Ayr community.

KY 255 widens somewhat past this point, continuing on for another mile before bridging the Louie B. Nunn Cumberland Expressway via way of an overpass. The route then proceeds north for 0.8 miles (1.3 km) before coming to an intersection with KY 1339. KY 255 then continues north for 2.5 miles (4.0 km) before being carried onto a bridge over a CSX railroad track, the Louisville and Nashville Railroad before intersecting U.S. Route 31W. KY 255 previously passed the ruins of Bells Tavern, and then intersected US 31W (Second Street) after a railroad crossing until 2012, when it was re-routed to go over the tracks via a new bridge on the west side of town. KY 255's concurrency with US 31W lasts 0.16 miles (0.26 km), where KY 255 turns left onto Mammoth Cave Parkway. Its original concurrency with US 31W lasted for 0.2 miles (0.32 km).

=== Mammoth Cave National Park and northwestern Barren County ===
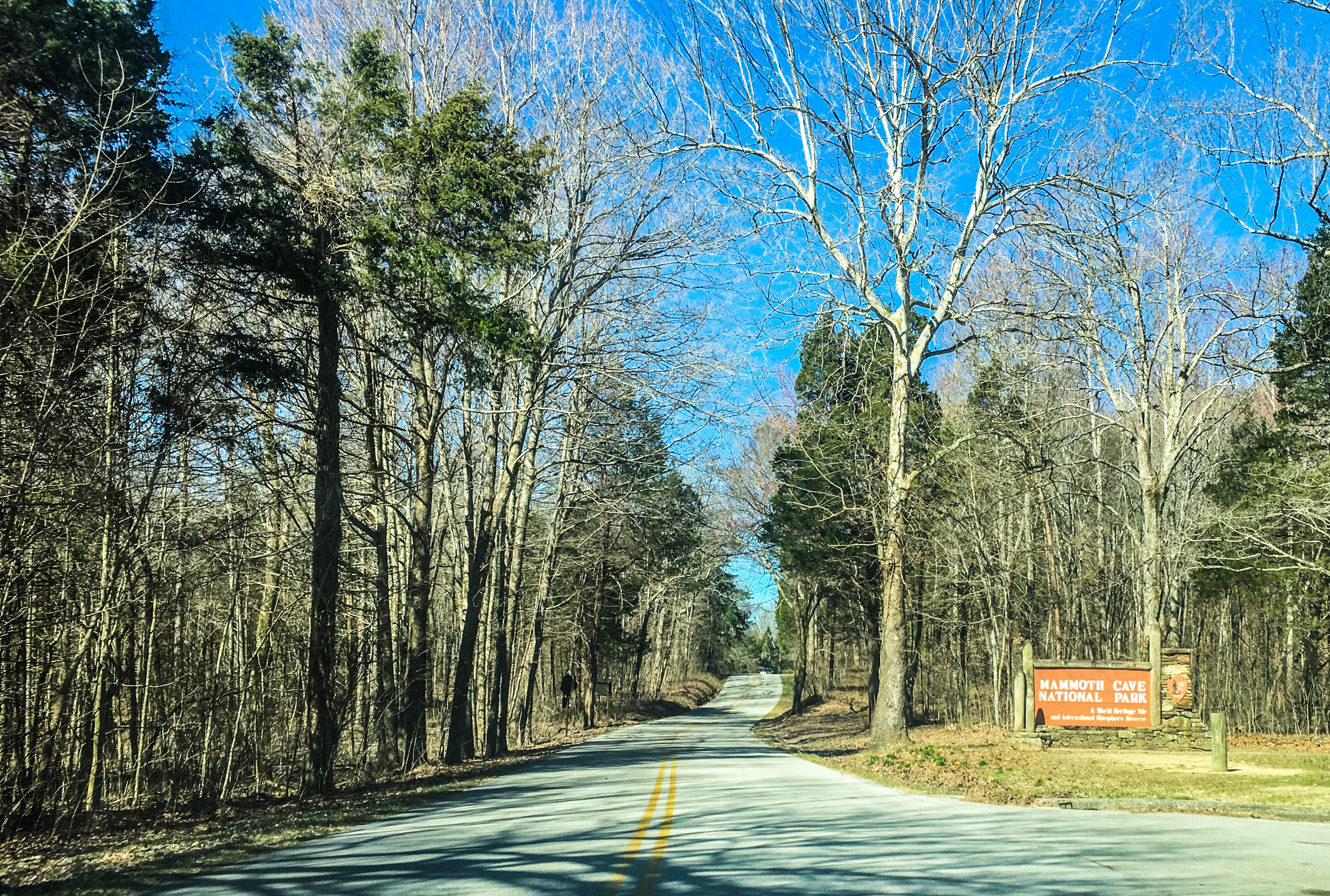
Entrance of Mammoth Cave National Park at KY 255's northern terminus near the Sand Cave

After its brief concurrency with US 31W, KY 255 branches north, going 0.4 miles (0.64 km) before intersecting with Interstate 65 (I-65) at its Exit 48 interchange. After this intersection, KY 255 continues in a northwesterly path and enters Mammoth Cave National Park; the southern entrance of the park is approximately 0.4 miles (0.64 km) north of the Interstate. It proceeds north for another 0.9 miles (1.4 km), passing Diamond Caverns before entering the far eastern portion of Edmonson County and reaching its first intersection with KY 70 in the southern part of the park near the site of a former town named Chaumont. At that point, KY 255 joins KY 70 by making a right turn eastward to re-enter Barren County. This concurrency lasts for 1.666 miles (2.681 km) before reaching an intersection in Highland Springs, where KY 255 turns left, while KY 70 turns right to head for Cave City. KY 255's current northern terminus is located near the Sand Cave Trail at the southeastern entrance into the Mammoth Cave National Park; that point marks the end of state maintenance. The road itself, however continues into the park solely as Cave City Road, and ends at another intersection with the Mammoth Cave Parkway just south of the park's visitor center. This road was part of the original KY 70 alignment within the park until it was rerouted to its current in-park alignment in the 1960s.

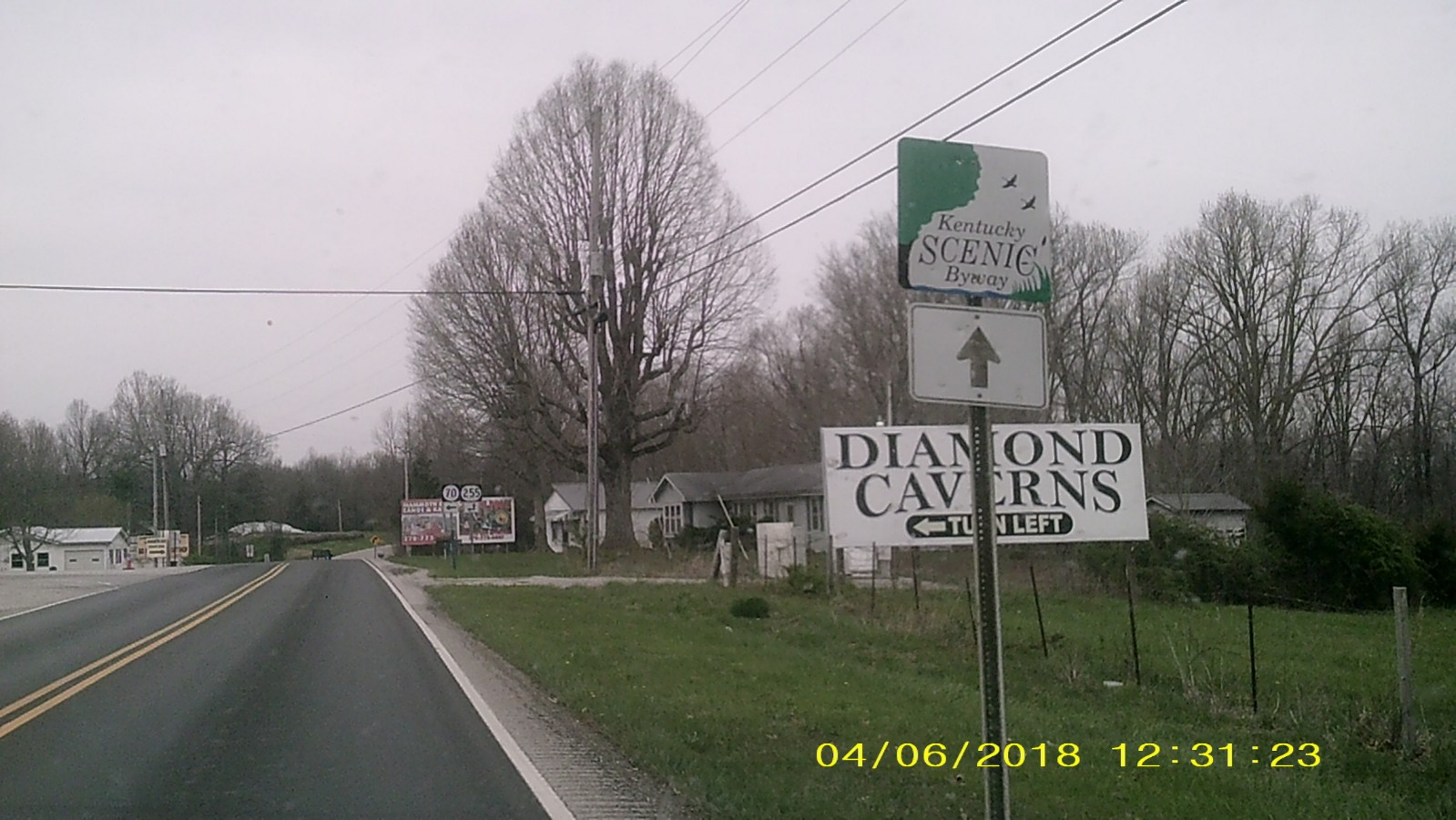
This Kentucky Scenic Byway sign on KY 70 points to KY 255's final segment, which leads to Mammoth Cave National Park.

KY 255's final 1.259 miles (2.026 km) segment between Highland Springs and the northern terminus is part of the Cordell Hull Scenic Highway, part of the Kentucky Scenic Byways system.

== History ==
The state route was established during the 1930s. it originally ran from Park City northward to closely follow and cross the Barren-Edmonson County line on its way to Chaumont, and then eastward into Barren County to end where the current eastern split of KY 255 and KY 70 is located. In the 1950s, the KY 255 designation was extended southward onto a few formerly locally maintained back roads to Bon Ayr (formerly Bonayer), and further south to KY 252 at Game (now Rocky Hill) just north of the Barren River shortly before that segment of the river was impounded to form Barren River Lake. KY 255 was also extended onto the old KY 70 alignment from the current KY 255/70 split in Barren County to the southeast boundary of the Mammoth Cave National Park.

In 1991, the segment of KY 255 from the I-65 interchange at Park City to the KY 70 junction at Chaumont was transferred to the National Park Service for that stretch of roadway to become a new portion of Mammoth Cave National Park.

== Points of interest ==
The ruins of Bells Tavern are located alongside the original KY 255 alignment near the railroad tracks in Park City. Built in 1830, it was a favorite stop of wealthy patrons before it burned in 1860. A roadside marker marks the location of the tavern and details some of its history.

Diamond Caverns, the second oldest cave tour operation in the United States, is located just off of KY 255, just north of its intersection with I-65. A roadside marker gives a history of the site.

== Major intersections ==
County	Location	mi	km	Destinations	Notes
Barren	Rocky Hill	0.000	0.000	KY 252 (Finney Road) to US 31E	Southern terminus
Barren		3.298	5.308	KY 1297 (Old Bowling Green Road)	
Barren	Bon Ayr	6.320	10.171	US 68 / KY 80 (Bowling Green Road) – Bowling Green, Glasgow	
Barren		8.161	13.134	KY 1339 west (Apple Grove Road) – Rocky Hill, Barren County	Eastern terminus of KY 1339
Barren	Park City	11.473	18.464	US 31W south (Louisville Road) – Bowling Green	Western end of US 31W overlap
Barren	Park City	11.634	18.723	US 31W north (Second Street) – Cave City	Eastern end of US 31W overlap, southern terminus of Mammoth Cave Parkway and beginning of overlap
Barren	Park City	12.036	19.370	I-65 north – Louisville	Exit 48 off I-65 NB and on-ramp to I-65 NB
Barren	Park City	12.052	19.396	I-65 south – Nashville	Exit 48 off I-65 SB and on-ramp to I-65 SB
Edmonson	Mammoth Cave	14.352	23.097	Mammoth Cave Parkway west / KY 70 west – Brownsville, Mammoth Cave Tours/Visitor Center	Northern end of concurrency with Mammoth Cave Parkway; western end of KY 70 concurrency
Barren	Highland Springs	15.718	25.296	KY 70 east (Mammoth Cave Road) to I-65 / KY 90 – Cave City, Glasgow	Eastern end of KY 70 concurrency
Barren	Mammoth Cave	16.977	27.322	Mammoth Cave National Park near Park Ridge Road – To Visitor Center	Northern terminus; end of state maintenance; road continues as Cave City Road/East Entrance Road.
1.000 mi = 1.609 km; 1.000 km = 0.621 mi: Concurrency terminus
