= Kentucky Route 252 =

State highway in Kentucky, United States

Kentucky Route 252
- KY 252 highlighted in red

Route information
- Maintained by KYTC
- Length: 16.093 mi (25.899 km)

Major junctions
- South end: US 31E / KY 1855 northeast of Scottsville
- KY 1533 at Port Oliver; KY 255 northeast of Finney
- North end: US 31E at Haywood (Barren County)

Location
- Country: United States
- State: Kentucky
- Counties: Allen, Barren

Highway system
- Kentucky State Highway System; Interstate; US; State; Parkways
← KY 251	→ KY 253

Kentucky Route 252 (KY 252, known locally as Port Oliver Circle, or Barren River Dam Road) is a 16.093-mile-long (25.899 km) north–south route traversing two counties in south-central Kentucky in the Barren River Lake area. Both its north and south termini are intersections with U.S. Route 31E (US 31E) at two separate locations in two different counties.

== Route description ==
The beginning of KY 252 is located at a crossroads intersection with US 31E and KY 1855 in the Allen County community of Cedar Springs, located just northeast of Scottsville and just west of the Barren River Lake State Resort Park. An intersection with the short KY 1533 is located just before KY 252 reaches the Barren River Dam and the Allen–Barren county line.

KY 252 reaches the unincorporated community of Finney after crossing the Barren River Dam into Barren County. It has a junction at the southern terminus of KY 255 just north of the lake. KY 252 reaches its end at a second intersection with US 31E in Haywood, a small community just south of Glasgow.

== Major intersections ==
County	Location	mi	km	Destinations	Notes
Allen		0.000	0.000	US 31E south (New Glasgow Road) / KY 1855 (Old Glasgow Road)	Southern terminus; northern terminus of KY 1855; continues as KY 1855 beyond US 31E
Allen		1.855– 1.933	2.985– 3.111	KY 517 north (Bailey Point Road)	Southern terminus of KY 517
Allen		4.061	6.536	KY 1533 west (Meador Port Oliver Road)	Eastern terminus of KY 1533
Barren		6.565	10.565	KY 2065 south (Peninsula Road)	Northern terminus of KY 2065
Barren		9.590	15.434	KY 255 north (Rocky Hill Road) / Settles Road	Southern terminus of KY 255
Barren		13.500	21.726	KY 2207 east (Southfork Road)	Western terminus of KY 2207
Barren		13.740	22.112	KY 1342 south (Beaver Creek Boat Ramp Road)	Northern terminus of KY 1342
Barren		16.093	25.899	US 31E (Scottsville Road)	Eastern terminus
1.000 mi = 1.609 km; 1.000 km = 0.621 mi
