= Kentucky Route 70 =

State highway in Kentucky, United States

Kentucky Route 70
- KY 70; mainline in red, business route in blue

Route information
- Maintained by KYTC
- Length: 294.962 mi (474.695 km)

Major junctions
- West end: US 60 in Smithland
- KY 866 near Dycusburg; KY 295 in Dycusburg; US 641 in Fredonia; I-69 in Madisonville; Future I-569 / Western Kentucky Parkway in Central City; US 431 near Drakesboro; I-165 near Morgantown; I-65 in Cave City; US 68 / KY 55 / KY 527 in Campbellsville; US 127 in Liberty
- East end: US 150 near Brodhead

Location
- Country: United States
- State: Kentucky
- Counties: Livingston, Crittenden, Caldwell, Hopkins, Muhlenberg, Butler, Edmonson, Barren, Metcalfe, Green, Taylor, Casey, Pulaski, Lincoln, Rockcastle

Highway system
- Kentucky State Highway System; Interstate; US; State; Parkways
← KY 69	→ I-71

Kentucky Route 70 (KY 70) is a long east–west state highway that originates at a junction with U.S. Route 60 (US 60) in Smithland in Livingston County, just east of the Ohio River. The route continues through the counties of Crittenden, Caldwell, Hopkins, Muhlenberg, Butler, Edmonson, Barren, Barren, Metcalfe, Green, Taylor, Casey, Pulaski, Lincoln and back into Pulaski again to terminate at a junction with US 150 near Maretburg in Rockcastle.

== Route description ==
=== Livingston County ===
Kentucky Route 70 begins in the Livingston County seat of Smithland, Kentucky, originating at a junction with U.S. Route 60 (US 60). It travels eastward to a junction with KY 866, and reaches a dead end at Tiline, along the Cumberland River. KY 70 does not connect from Tiline to Dycusburg since the ferry service at that point was discontinued in 1951.

=== Crittenden and Caldwell counties ===
KY 70 returns to life at Dycusburg, on the Crittenden County side of the river. KY 295 ends at that same point. KY 70 moves on to join US 641 and KY 91 in southern Crittenden County, and all three routes enters Caldwell County near the community of Fredonia. KY 70 and 91 departs from US 641, and then the two state routes split not too long after. KY 91 goes southeast for Princeton, while KY 70 continues due east to go through mainly rural sections of northern Caldwell County, intersecting KY 293 just northeast of Princeton.

=== Hopkins and Muhlenberg counties ===
KY 70 crosses the Tradewater River into Hopkins County. It intersects KY 109 at Beulah, and then reaches Madisonville, the Hopkins County seat. It gets co-signed with US 41 in downtown Madisonville before breaking off and then traverses the Exit 114 interchange of Interstate 69 (I-69) (formerly Edward T. Breathitt Pennyrile Parkway exit 42) on the east side. It intersects KY 85 just east of town before KY 70 enters Muhlenberg County, while KY 85 provides access into McLean County.

After entering Muhlenberg County, KY 70 goes through mainly northern areas of that county, including intersections with Kentucky Routes 175, and 181, before reaching the Central City area, where it would join US 431 for a little while.

In Central City, US 431 and KY 70 both meet US 62, and then traverse the exit 58 interchange of the Wendell H. Ford Western Kentucky Parkway (also known as the WK Parkway). That interchange was a former toll booth site until the 1987 discontinuation of the WK Parkway's toll plazas.

The concurrently running US 431 and KY 70 continues southeastward from Central City through the intersection of KY 176 in Drakesboro, all the way to about 2 miles (3.2 km) south of Drakesboro. Much of US 431's concurrency with KY 70 is designated as part of a Kentucky Scenic Byway.

KY 70 leaves the US 431 concurrency at that point south of Drakesboro, and provides a scenic drive from there, past the old site of the Rochester Dam before crossing the Mud River into Butler County. Until 2021, steam from the Tennessee Valley Authority's Paradise Coal-firing plant can be seen from the highway between Drakesboro and Rochester.

=== Butler County ===
In Butler County, Kentucky Route 70 intersects KY 369 while going through Rochester. It then intersects Kentucky Route 106 (KY 106/Huntsville-Quality Road) not too far southeast of there, and would then go on to the communities of South Hill and Dunbar.

Not too far east of Dunbar, KY 70 intersects KY 1468 and enters the city of Morgantown. The route intersects an interchange of I-165, the former William H. Natcher Parkway. That intersection opened during the 1999-2000 fiscal year. Between I-165 and US 231/KY 79, KY 70 is known as Veterans Way and runs concurrently with US 231 Truck and KY 79 Truck.

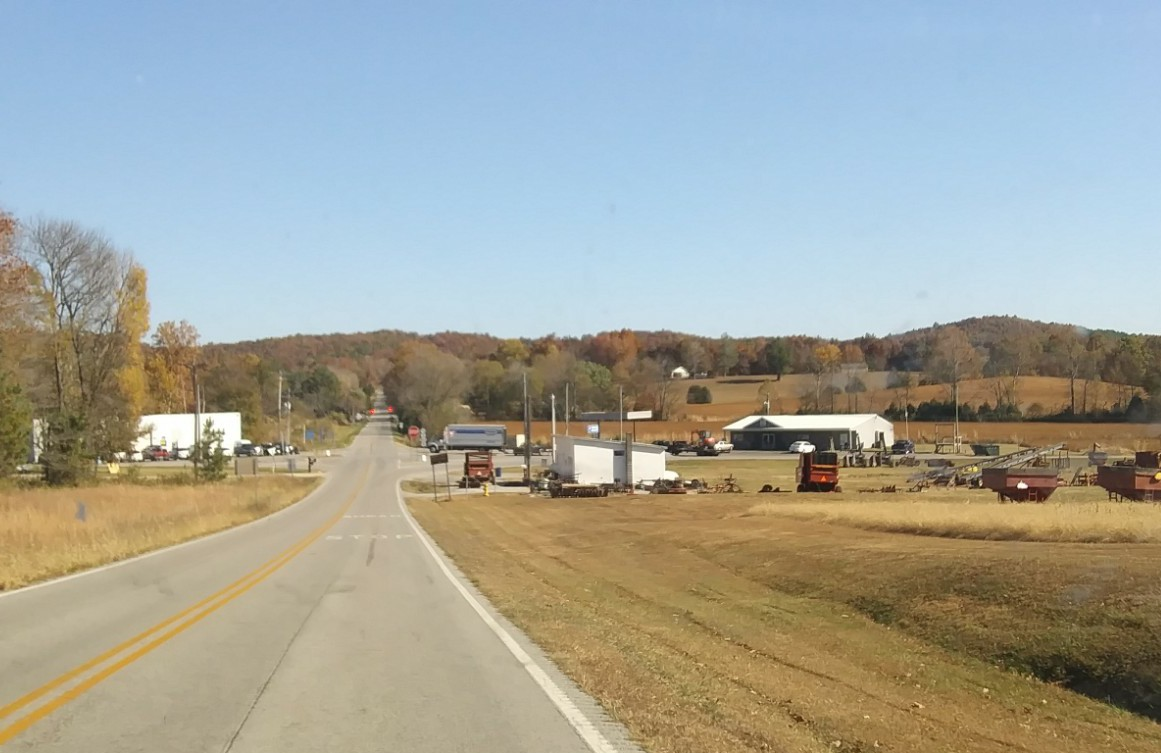
KY 70's junction with KY 185 in Roundhill

KY 70 runs concurrently with U.S. Route 231 and Kentucky Route 79 from Morgantown, over the Green River into the community of Aberdeen. In Aberdeen, KY 70 actually departs US 231 a little bit after KY 79 does. KY 70 then intersects KY 79 for a final time, continuing east from Aberdeen through Huldeville and Jetson before arriving at Roundhill, where it intersects Kentucky Route 185 at an all-way stop.

=== The Caveland area (Edmonson, Barren, and Metcalfe counties) ===
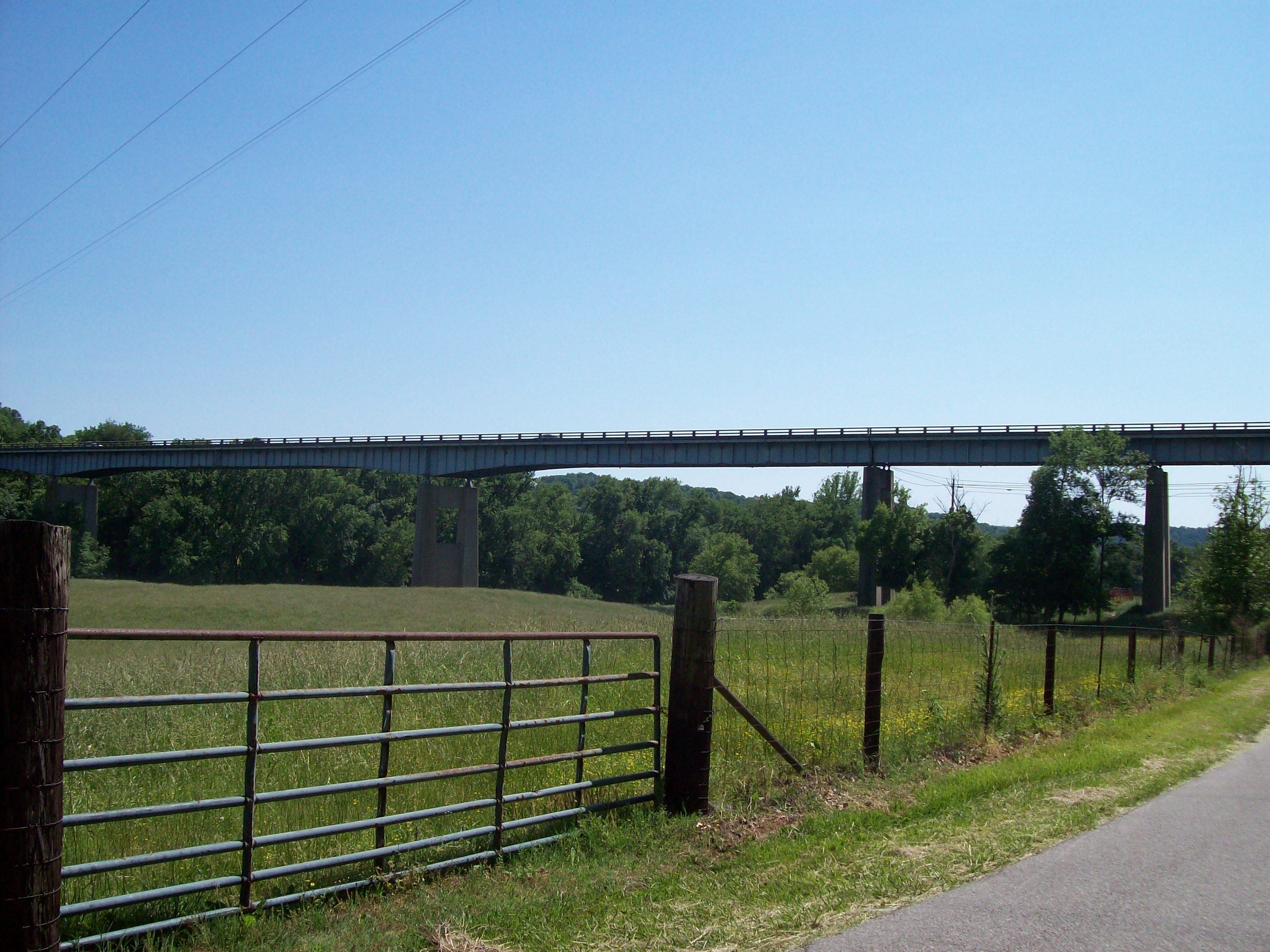
Bridge carrying KY 70/259 in Brownsville

Immediately after the intersection with KY 185, KY 70 enters Edmonson County, where it runs onward towards the communities of Huff and Windyville before it meets KY 259, and the two routes run concurrently to cross the Green River at Brownsville, the Edmonson County seat. This is KY 70's second crossing of the Green River. The two state routes run concurrently throughout the city of Brownsville, and splits just south of the entrance to the Edmonson County High School on the south side of town.

Going east from Brownsville, KY 70 is the main route through Mammoth Cave National Park in Edmonson County, including the site of the former town of Elko. While traversing the park, KY 70 runs concurrently with the Mammoth Cave Parkway before entering Barren County. After a brief concurrency with KY 255 from Chaumont to near Highland Springs, KY 70 traverses the exit 53 interchange of I-65, and meeting the western terminus of KY 90 and then crosses US 31W, all three actions occur in Cave City, which is the core part of a tourism hotbed in Barren County because of the close proximity to the Mammoth Cave National Park.

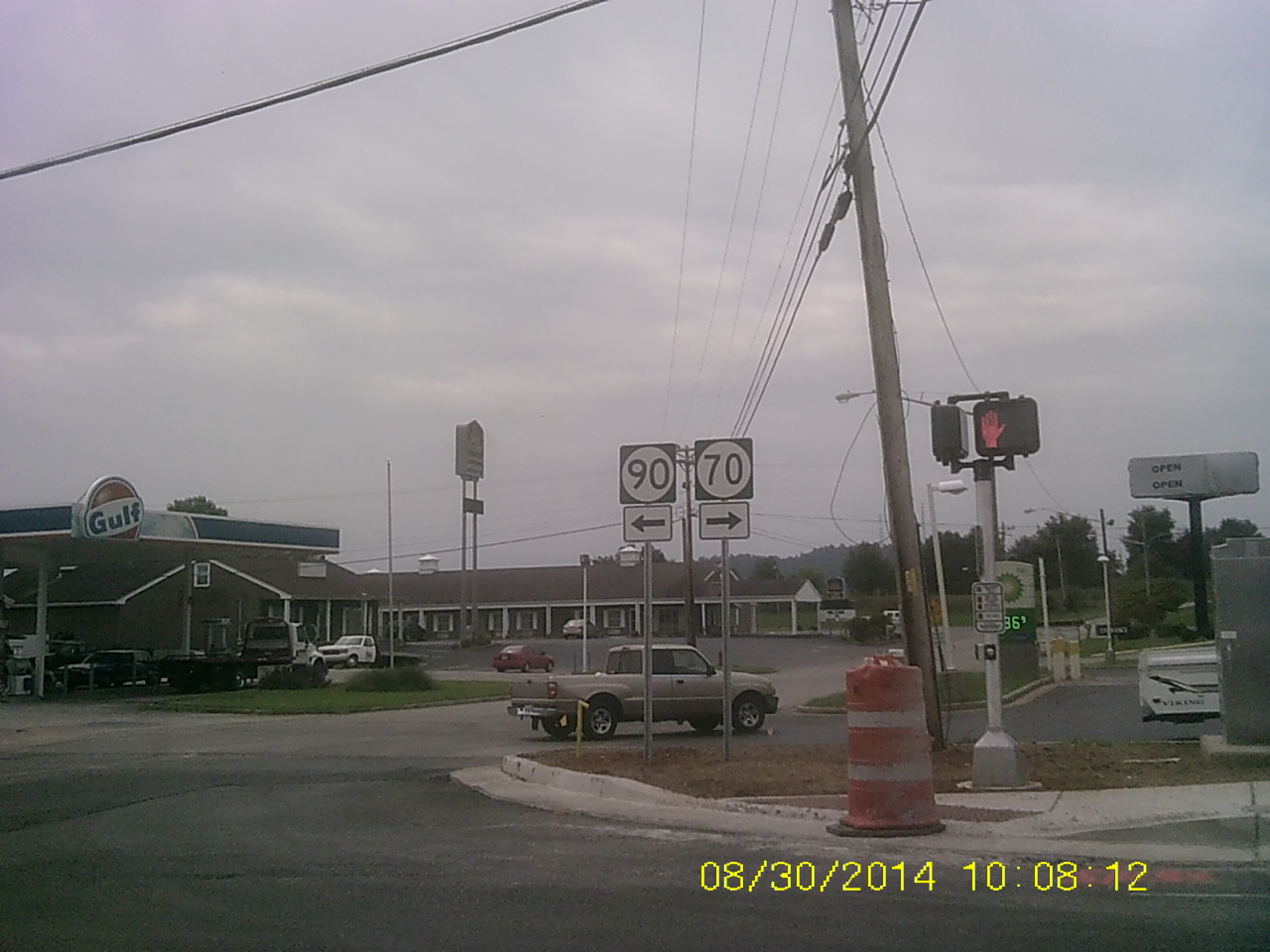
Kentucky Route 70's intersection with KY 90 at Cave City, Kentucky

Most of KY 70 from Brownsville to Cave City is designated as part of an official Kentucky Scenic Byway. KY 70 from the Mammoth Cave park's southeast boundary to the junction with KY 90 is part of the Cordell Hull Scenic Byway, most of which is the core route of the annual Roller Coaster Yard Sale, which includes parts of KY 90 and KY 63 in the southern part of the state.

After departing Cave City, KY 70 goes further east to cross U.S. Route 31E at Griderville, and heads for Hiseville, and then crosses into the northern part of Metcalfe County. After KY 70's entrance into Metcalfe County, it goes through Sulphur Well, and then beyond that point, KY 70 joins US 68.

=== Green and Taylor counties ===
Both KY 70 and U.S. Route 68 begins a concurrency going through northern Metcalfe County before entering Green County and go through Exie, and Greensburg to cross the Green River (this is KY 70's third Green River crossing). After running a concurrency with a third route, KY 61, US 68/KY 70 continues east into Taylor County, where it transitions from Central into the Eastern time zone. In Campbellsville, KY 70's companionship with US 68 ends, and KY 70 goes back to being a standalone highway. KY 70 is replaced with KY 55, which joined US 68 on the west side of Campbellsville, in terms of concurrency with US 68 for its course to Lebanon. KY 70, alone, continues eastward through eastern Taylor County to Elk Horn and Mannsville.

=== Casey, Lincoln, Pulaski, and Rockcastle counties ===
Kentucky Route 70 reaches Casey County, where it reaches Liberty, cross the Green River for a fourth time, and intersect US 127. After that KY 70 crosses the Green River for a fifth and final time, and traverses mainly rural areas of Casey, and then parts of southern Lincoln and northern Pulaski Counties. US 27 crosses KY 70 near Eubank, just north of Science Hill. KY 70 ends at its eastern terminus at a junction with US 150 near the Rockcastle County community of Broadhead, just west of Mount Vernon.

=== Points of interest along the route ===
- John Prine Memorial Park at Rochester Dam.
- Rochester Dam (Lock and Dam #3)
- Charles Black City Park in Morgantown - home to the annual Green River Catfish Festival held in late June and early July.
- Mammoth Cave National Park (Official Page)
  - Joppa Baptist Church and Cemetery (historical church building)
- Kentucky Action Park and Jesse James Riding Stables near Cave City is a major attraction in the region that identifies itself as a one-stop spot for family fun. The riding stable has won A Certificate of Excellence for 2012 by its guests, along with TripAdvisor.
- Guntown Mountain is a realistic replica of an Old West town accessible via a scenic skylift.
- Dinosaur World just 100 yards west of the I-65 Exit 53 interchange with KY 70.
- Lighthouse Restaurant - a roadside diner in Sulphur Well offering southern style dishes.

== History ==
=== Before 1980 ===
Kentucky Route 70 was one of the many charter routes when the Kentucky State Highway system was first started in the 1920s and 1930s

East of Cave City, KY 70 originally ran concurrently with US 31E from Griderville, into Hart County to Hardyville, and followed KY 88's present-day route to Greensburg. KY 70 between Griderville and Greensburg was rerouted to its current alignment via Hiseville and Sulphur Well no later than 1936.

At Dycusburg, KY 70 connected from Livingston County into southern Crittenden County via a ferry crossing on the Cumberland River. Ferry service in Dycusburg was discontinued in 1951.

In the Mammoth Cave area, parts of KY 70 was rerouted onto a more direct route between Brownsville and Cave City at sometime in the early half of the 1960s. The route originally ran onto the present-day Joppa Ridge Road, the first mile of Green River Ferry Road, a small portion of the Mammoth Cave Parkway (South Entrance Road) near the Visitors Center, and Cave City Road within the park, as well as the final 2 miles (3.2 km) of KY 255's current designation northwest of Highland Springs.

A 1950 highway planning survey conducted by the Kentucky Department of Highways and the United States Department of Agriculture showed that the segment between KY 70's original eastern entrance to Mammoth Cave National Park and its crossing of the Louisville and Nashville Railroad in downtown Cave City was the most heavily traveled segment of the route.

=== Recent route changes and improvements ===
The low underpass under railroad tracks near Eubank just west of the US 27 junction has been closed and bypassed with a highway overpass just north of old route. The new roadway is wider and has no restrictions.

Improvements were completed in Liberty in early 2013 to widen KY 70 from near Green River bridge, to Connector Road, as part of the Dry Ridge Hill reconstruction project. Future plans include major upgrades further east past the Casey County High School with improvements ending near KY 501.

Reconstruction of KY 70 west of Liberty from KY 1547 to KY 206 area near Creston. Further plans would create a more direct route for KY 70 between Campbellsville and Liberty.

=== Bear Creek Bridge Closure (2024) ===
In January 2024, the KYTC announced that the bridge over Bear Creek just east of the KY 187 junction in the Huff community of Edmonson County would be closed for three months, beginning February 5, for a bridge replacement project. The project was completed in late April that year, about a week ahead of schedule.

== Major intersections ==
County	Location	mi	km	Destinations	Notes
Livingston	Smithland	0.000	0.000	US 60	Western terminus
Livingston		6.850	11.024	KY 2232 south (Sugar Creek Road)	Northern terminus of KY 2232
Livingston		11.386	18.324	KY 866 south (Paradise Road)/Tyline Road	KY 70 ends in Livingston County at this point
Gap in route due to closure of ferry (Tyline Road follows former KY 70 route east to river)
Crittenden	Dycusburg	11.386	18.324	KY 295 south	Northern terminus of KY 295; KY 70 continues at this point
Crittenden		11.822	19.026	KY 902 east (Fredonia Road)	Western terminus of KY 902
Crittenden	Frances	16.805	27.045	KY 855 north	Begin concurrency with KY 855
Crittenden		17.381	27.972	KY 855 south	End KY 855 concurrency
Crittenden				US 641 north / KY 91 north	Beginning of concurrency with US 641 and KY 91
Caldwell	Fredonia	23.652	38.064	KY 902 west (Bakers Lane)	Beginning of KY 902 concurrency
Caldwell	Fredonia	23.773	38.259	KY 902 east (Piney Lane)	Ending of KY 902 concurrency
Caldwell	Fredonia	23.997	38.619	US 641 south (Cassidy Avenue)	End of concurrency with US 641
Caldwell	Fredonia	24.489	39.411	KY 91 sout2h (Marion Road)	End of KY 91 concurrency
Caldwell	Flat Rock	29.408	47.328	KY 1077 north (Rowland Cemetery Road)	Southern terminus of KY 1077
Caldwell		33.185	53.406	KY 139 (Farmersville Road)	
Caldwell	Fryer	37.936	61.052	KY 293 south	Beginning of KY 293 concurrency
Caldwell		38.920	62.636	KY 293 north	End of KY 293 concurrency
Hopkins		40.972	65.938	KY 291 north (Dalton Road)	Southern terminus of KY 291
Hopkins		45.244	72.813	KY 2273 west (Fergustown Road)	Eastern terminus of KY 2273
Hopkins	Beulah	46.823	75.354	KY 109 (Rabbit Ridge Road/Charleston Road)	
Hopkins	Richland	52.058	83.779	KY 1337 east (Earlington Road)	Western terminus of KY 1337
Hopkins	Madisonville	56.970	91.684	KY 1302 west (Pleasant View Road)	Eastern terminus of KY 1302
Hopkins	Madisonville	57.459	92.471	KY 2274 south (Legion Drive)	Northern terminus of KY 2774
Hopkins	Madisonville	58.380	93.954	US 41 south (South Main Street) / KY 481 south (East McLaughlin Avenue)	Southern/western end of concurrency with US 41; northern terminus of KY 481
Hopkins	Madisonville	59.103	95.117	US 41 north (North Main Street) / KY 262 west (West Center Street)	Northern/eastern end of concurrency with US 41; eastern terminus of KY 262
Hopkins	Madisonville	61.598	99.132	I-69 south – Hopkinsville	Exit 114 from SB I-69 & ramps to SB I-69 (formerly the Pennyrile Parkway)
Hopkins	Madisonville	61.742	99.364	KY 254 north (Brown Road) to I-69 north – Henderson	Exit 114 from NB I-69; ramp to NB I-69 is off KY 254
Hopkins		64.156	103.249	KY 1221 south (Pond River-Colliers Road)	Northern terminus of KY 1221
Hopkins		65.199	104.928	KY 85 east (Anton Road) – Sacramento	KY 70 turns right (east) along Central City Road here; Anton Road continues straight as KY 85; western terminus of KY 85
Hopkins		65.310	105.106	KY 6113 south (Bethlehem Lane)	Northern terminus of KY 6113
Muhlenberg	Earles	75.192	121.010	KY 175 south	Beginning of KY 175 concurrency
Muhlenberg		74.082	119.223	KY 175 north	Ending of KY 175 concurrency
Muhlenberg		78.610	126.511	KY 181 to Western Kentucky Parkway – Greenville	
Muhlenberg	Central City	83.055	133.664	US 431 north (Phillip Stone Way) / KY 304 east (Front Street)	Northern/western end of concurrency with US 431; western terminus of KY 304
Muhlenberg	Central City	84.430	135.877	US 62 west (Everly Brothers Boulevard)	Western end of concurrency with US 62
Muhlenberg	Central City	84.515	136.014	KY 277 north (West Reservoir Avenue) - Elijah Summers Elementary School, Dokken	Southern terminus of KY 277
Muhlenberg	Central City	85.298	137.274	KY 2103 north (Ash Street)	Southern terminus of KY 2103
Muhlenberg	Central City	85.889	138.225	US 62 east (Everly Brothers Parkway) / KY 1031 north (South 2nd Street) – Beaver Dam	Eastern end of concurrency with US 62; KY 1031 follows former routing of US 431; US 62 continues straight ahead while US 431/KY 70 turn right (US 62 to Beaver Dam)
Muhlenberg	Central City	86.589	139.351	Western Kentucky Parkway west – Paducah	Exit 58 from WB parkway and ramp to WB parkway
Muhlenberg	Central City	86.689	139.512	Western Kentucky Parkway east – Elizabethtown	Exit 58 from EB parkway and ramp to EB parkway
Muhlenberg	Central City	86.917	139.879	KY 604 east	Western terminus of KY 604
Muhlenberg		87.629	141.025	KY 2107 south	Northern terminus of KY 2107
Muhlenberg		92.115	148.245	KY 2107 Conn. to KY 2107 north	Connector road to KY 2107, primarily for traffic heading south on 431/70
Muhlenberg		92.185	148.357	KY 2107 north	No access to 2107 North from SB 431/70; southern terminus of KY 2107
Muhlenberg	Drakesboro	92.700	149.186	KY 176 – Greenville, Paradise	Boulevard = WB, Avenue = EB
Muhlenberg	Browder	94.333	151.814	US 431 south – Dunmor, Lewisburg, Russellville	Southern/eastern end of US 431 concurrency
Muhlenberg	Ennis	98.193	158.026	KY 2270 south	Northern terminus of KY 2270
Butler	Rochester	103.312	166.265	KY 369 north (Russellville Street) to KY 1117	Southern terminus of KY 369
Butler		105.066	169.087	KY 106 south (Huntsville-Quality Road) – Quality	Northern terminus of KY 106
Butler		108.472	174.569	KY 3205 south	Northern terminus of KY 3205
Butler	Morgantown	112.133	180.461	KY 2267 south (Dunbar-Leetown Road)	Northern terminus of KY 2267
Butler	Morgantown	112.709	181.388	KY 1117 west (Provo Road)	Eastern terminus of KY 1117
Butler	Morgantown	115.016	185.100	KY 1468 east (Gardner Lane Road)	Western terminus of KY 1468
Butler	Morgantown	115.512	185.899	I-165 south / US 231 Truck south / KY 79 Truck south – Bowling Green	Exit 27 from southbound I-165 Parkway and ramps to I-165 South; Begin concurrency with US 231 Truck and KY 79 Truck.
Butler	Morgantown	115.612	186.059	I-165 north – Owensboro	Exit 27 from northbound I-165 and ramps to I-165 North
Butler	Morgantown	117.013	188.314	KY 403 north (Logansport Road) / KY 2162 east (Old Logansport Road)	Beginning of brief concurrency of KY 403; western terminus of KY 2162
Butler	Morgantown	117.103	188.459	US 231 south (G.L. Smith Street) / KY 79 south / KY 403 south – Morgantown, Woodbury	Eastern end of the concurrencies with KY 403, US 231 Truck, and KY 79 Truck; southern end of concurrencies with US 231 and KY 79; US 231 Truck and KY 79 Truck ends
Butler		117.847– 118.127	189.656– 190.107	Bridge over the Green River at Morgantown	
Butler	Aberdeen	118.916	191.377	KY 79 north (Caneyville Road) – Caneyville	Northrrn end of KY 79 concurrency
Butler	Aberdeen	119.163	191.774	KY 1328 east (Leonard Oak Road)	Western terminus of KY 1328
Butler		119.874	192.919	US 231 north (Beaver Dam Road) to I-165 – Beaver Dam, Hartford, Owensboro	Northern end of US 231 concurrency
Butler	Aberdeen	120.605	194.095	KY 79 (Caneyville Road)	
Butler	Huldeville	124.776	200.808	KY 340 north (Brooklyn Road)	Southern terminus of KY 340
Butler	Jetson	129.635	208.627	KY 1328 west (Millshed Road)	Eastern terminus of KY 1328
Butler	Whittinghill	130.457	209.950	KY 411 north (Love Lee Road)	Southern terminus of KY 411
Butler	Roundhill	135.432	217.957	KY 185 – Big Reedy, Bowling Green	
Edmonson	Huff	139.293	224.170	KY 187 north (Sunfish Road) – Leitchfield	Southern terminus of KY 187
Edmonson		141.820	228.237	KY 655 east (Segal Road)	Western (clockwise) terminus of KY 655
Edmonson	Windyville	142.796	229.808	KY 655 west (Segal Road) – Asphalt	Eastern (counterclockwise) terminus of KY 655
Edmonson		143.904	231.591	KY 1365 north (Grassland-Black Gold Road)	Southern terminus of KY 1365
Edmonson	Brownsville	145.394	233.989	KY 259 north – Bee Spring, Leitchfield, Nolin Lake State Park	Begin KY 259 concurrency
Edmonson	Brownsville	146.074	235.083	KY 183 north (Lock Road)	Southern terminus of KY 183
Edmonson	Brownsville	146.222– 146.464	235.321– 235.711	Bridge over KY 183 (Lock Road), the Green River, and CR-1203	
Edmonson	Brownsville	147.203	236.900	KY 2184 north (Washington Street) – Brownsville City Park, Green River Amphitheater, Camp Joy	Southern terminus of KY 2184
Edmonson	Brownsville	147.551	237.460	Houchin's Ferry Road	Alternate route to Edmonson County High School
Edmonson	Brownsville	147.613	237.560	Wildcat Way	Connects to Edmonson County High School
Edmonson	Brownsville	147.843	237.930	KY 259 south (South Main Street) to KY 101 – Rhoda, Smiths Grove, Bowling Green	End concurrency with KY 259
Edmonson	Mammoth Cave	152.517	245.452	KY 2325 south (Silent Grove Church Road)	Northern terminus of KY 2325
Edmonson	Mammoth Cave	157.617	253.660	Mammoth Cave Parkway north – Visitor Center/Cave Tours	Main entrance to Mammoth Cave National Park; beginning of concurrency with Mammoth Cave Parkway
Edmonson	Mammoth Cave	160.117	257.683	Mammoth Cave Parkway / KY 255 south to I-65 south – Park City	End concurrency with Mammoth Cave Parkway; begin concurrency with KY 255
Barren	Highland Springs	161.890	260.537	KY 255 north – Frozen Niagara Entrance, Mammoth Cave Tours/Visitors Center	End concurrency with KY 255
Barren	Cave City	165.303	266.029	I-65 south – Nashville	Exit 53 to/from 65 south
Barren	Cave City	165.403	266.190	I-65 north – Louisville	Exit 53 to/from 65 north
Barren	Cave City	165.548	266.424	KY 90 east (Happy Valley Road) – Glasgow	Western terminus of KY 90; 70 turns north here while 90 begins directly east
Barren	Cave City	166.966	268.706	US 31W (Dixie Highway) – Horse Cave, Park City, Bowling Green, Caverna Memorial Hospital	
Barren	Cave City	167.645	269.798	KY 2195 east (Old Lexington Road)	Western terminus of KY 2195
Barren		168.601	271.337	KY 685 south (Wilson Road)	Northern terminus of KY 685
Barren		172.063	276.909	US 31E (Jackson Highway) – Hodgenville, Glasgow, Barren River Lake S.R.P.	
Barren	Hiseville	175.336	282.176	KY 740	
Barren		176.635	284.266	KY 314 north (Center Road) – Center	Southern terminus of KY 314
Barren		177.167	285.123	KY 2131 west (Corral Hill-Halfway Road)	Eastern terminus of KY 2131
Metcalfe	Knob Lick	182.340	293.448	KY 640 south / KY 2435 north	Northern terminus of KY 640; southern terminus of KY 2435
Metcalfe	Knob Lick	182,953	294,434	KY 1243 north	Southern terminus of KY 1243
Metcalfe		186.457	300.073	KY 869 north	Southern terminus of KY 869
Metcalfe		195.326	314.347	US 68 west to Cumberland Expressway – Edmonton	Beginning of concurrency with US 68
Green		197.933	318.542	KY 729 north (Little Barren Road)	Southern terminus of KY 729
Green		202.083	325.221	KY 487 north (Little Barren Road)	Southern terminus of KY 487
Green		203.606	327.672	KY 218 west – Horse Cave	Eastern terminus of KY 218
Green	Greensburg	209.461	337.095	KY 61 south – Columbia	Begin concurrency with KY 61
Green	Greensburg	210.892	339.398	KY 417 east (Legion Park Road)	Western terminus of KY 417
Green	Greensburg	211.794	340.849	KY 61 west – Hodgenville	End concurrency with KY 61
Green		214.135	344.617	KY 793 west	Eastern terminus of KY 793
Taylor		215.948	347.535	KY 2764 west	Eastern terminus of KY 2764
Taylor		216.297	348.096	KY 883 north	Southern terminus of KY 883
Taylor	Campbellsville	219.893	353.883	KY 323 (Friendship Pike/West Main Street)	Friendship Pike to the west, West Main Street to the east
Taylor	Campbellsville	220.788	355.324	KY 55 south / KY 210 west – Columbia, Green River Reservoir State Park, Hodgenville	Begin concurrency with KY 55; eastern terminus of KY 210
Taylor	Campbellsville	221.585	356.606	KY 323 west (North Columbia Avenue)	Eastern terminus of KY 323
Taylor	Campbellsville	221.725	356.832	KY 527 north (North Central Avenue) / US 68 east / KY 55 north (East Broadway Street) – Lebanon	End concurrency with US 68/KY 55; 70 continues to the east on South Central Avenue
Taylor	Campbellsville	222.805	358.570	KY 372 south (Smith Ridge Road)	Northern terminus of KY 372
Taylor	Campbellsville	223.606	359.859	KY 3518 north (Watertower Bypass)	
Taylor		225.893	363.540	KY 76 east (Kniffey Road) – Elkhorn, Pikes Ridge Recreation Area	Western terminus of KY 76
Taylor		226.752	364.922	KY 1799 north (Reids Chapel Road)	Southern terminus of KY 1799
Taylor	Acton	228.368	367.523	KY 1798 east (Stoner Creek Road) / KY 2784 north (Wooleyville Road)	Western terminus of KY 1798; southern terminus of KY 2784
Taylor	Mannsville	231.637	372.784	KY 337 north (Bradfordsville Road) – Bradfordsville	Southern terminus of KY 337
Taylor	Mannsville	231.957	373.299	KY 659 east (Raikes Hill Road)	Western terminus of KY 659
Taylor		234.824	377.913	KY 1798 west (Stoner Creek Road)	Eastern terminus of KY 1798
Taylor		235.682	379.293	KY 1752 west (Speck Ridge Road) / KY 659 west (Bass Ridge Road)	Eastern terminus of KY 1752; eastern terminus of KY 659
Casey		236.660	380.867	KY 1742 south (Roley Road)	Begin concurrency with KY 1742
Casey		236.834	381.147	KY 1742 north (Dry Creek Road)	End concurrency with KY 1742
Casey				KY 1859 north (Chicken Gizzard Road)	Southern terminus of KY 1859
Casey	Clementsville	240.297	386.721	KY 551 north (Possum Trot Road)	Begin concurrency with KY 551
Casey	Clementsville	240.345	386.798	KY 551 south (Knifely Road)	End concurrency with KY 551
Casey		243.677	392.160	KY 2970 south (Moxley Road)	Northern terminus of KY 2970
Casey		244.663	393.747	KY 206 west	Eastern terminus of KY 206
Casey		245.745	395.488	KY 1615 north	Southern terminus of KY 1615
Casey		247.957	399.048	KY 1547 north (White Oak Road)	Southern terminus of KY 1547
Casey	Liberty	249.271	401.163	KY 70 Bus. east (Campbell Street)	Western terminus of KY 70 Business. Former routing of KY 70
Casey	Liberty	249.883	402.148	US 127 south (Wallace Wilkinson Boulevard) – Russell Springs	Begin concurrency with US 127
Casey	Liberty	251.464	404.692	US 127 north (Wallace Wilkinson Boulevard) / KY 70 Bus. west (Campbellsville Street) – Danville, Liberty	End concurrency with US 127; eastern terminus of KY 70 Business
Casey	Liberty	252.302	406.041	KY 1649 east (Dry Ridge Road)	Western terminus of KY 1649
Casey	Liberty	252.539	406.422	KY 817 north	Southern terminus of KY 817
Casey	Yosemite	258.691	416.323	KY 198 north	Southern terminus of KY 198
Casey		259.594	417.776	KY 501 north (Grove Ridge Road)	Begin concurrency with KY 501
Casey		260.267	418.859	KY 501 south	End concurrency with KY 501
Casey		265.546	427.355	KY 837	
Pulaski		270.365	435.110	KY 635 east	Western terminus of KY 635
Lincoln		273.106	439.522	KY 328 east	Western terminus of KY 328
Pulaski	Eubank	275.592	443.522	KY 1247	
Pulaski	Eubank	278.132	447.610	US 27 – Stanford, Somerset	
Pulaski	Clarence	283.424	456.127	KY 865 north	Southern terminus of KY 865
Pulaski		287.629	462.894	KY 3267 north (Arnie Gentry Road)	
Rockcastle	Willailla	288.879	464.906	KY 3273 west (Owen School Road)	Beginning of concurrency with KY 3273
Rockcastle	Willailla	289.357	465.675	KY 3273 east (Level Green Road) – Level Green	End of concurrency with KY 3273
Rockcastle	Quail	290.544	467.585	KY 618 (Quail Road)	
Rockcastle		292.632	470.946	KY 1650 west – Ottawa	Eastern terminus of KY 1650
Rockcastle		294.962	474.695	US 150 to I-75 – Stanford, Mount Vernon	Eastern terminus
1.000 mi = 1.609 km; 1.000 km = 0.621 mi: Closed/former; Concurrency terminus; Incomplete access

== Special routes ==
=== Kentucky Route 70 Bypass (Cave City) ===
Kentucky Route 70 Bypass
- Location: Cave City, Kentucky
- Existed: 1960s–2010

Kentucky Route 70 Bypass was a supplemental bypass route in Cave City, Kentucky. The route encompassed the first 0.819 miles (1.318 km) of KY 90 (Happy Valley Road), and US 31W from the KY 90 junction to the KY 70 junction in downtown Cave City. Although the route was known as KY 70 Bypass, by the mid-2000s, it was only signed as a trailblazer sign along the two specified routes.

=== Kentucky Route 70 Business (Liberty) ===
Kentucky Route 70 Business
- Location: Liberty, Casey County
- Length: 2.800 mi (4.506 km)
- Existed: 2013–present

Kentucky Route 70 Business (KY 70 Bus.) is a business route of KY 70 in Liberty, Kentucky. It accounts with the old KY 70 alignment in downtown Liberty. It was formed after KY 70 was rerouted to a new junction with US 127. The business route starts just west of Liberty, and it goes through downtown to end at the intersection with US 127 and the re-routed regular KY 70, which resumes after the intersection. The regular alignment of KY 70 was rerouted to a new intersection with US 127, then it gets co-joined with US 127 north to re-join the original route of KY 70 near downtown Liberty.

The entire route is in Liberty, Casey County.

mi	km	Destinations	Notes
0.000	0.000	KY 70 (Campbellsville Road) to US 127 – Campbellsville, Liberty	Western terminus
2.291	3.687	KY 2312 east	Western terminus of KY-2312
2.338	3.763	KY 2312 west / KY 49 north – Bradfordsville, Lebanon	Southern terminus of KY-49; eastern terminus of KY-2312
2.474	3.982	KY 2313 south (Randolph Street)	Northern terminus of KY-2313
2.800	4.506	US 127 (Wallace Wilkinson Boulevard) / KY 70 (Middleburg Road) – Danville, Russell Springs, Yosemite, Eubank	Eastern terminus; KY 70 east straight ahead
1.000 mi = 1.609 km; 1.000 km = 0.621 mi
