= Highland Springs, Kentucky =

Unincorporated community in Kentucky, United States

Highland Springs
- Unincorporated community
- Location in the state of Kentucky Highland Springs (the United States)
- Coordinates: 37°07′53″N 86°01′33″W
- Country: United States
- State: Kentucky
- County: Barren
- Elevation: 938 ft (286 m)
- Time zone: UTC−6 (CST)
  - Summer (DST): UTC−5 (CDT)
- ZIP codes: 42127
- GNIS feature ID: 508239

Highland Springs is an unincorporated community in northwest Barren County, Kentucky, United States.

== Geography ==
Highland Springs is located near the junction of Kentucky Route 70 (KY 70) and Kentucky Route 255 (KY 255) just outside of the eastern boundary of Mammoth Cave National Park. It is located about 2.685 miles (4.321 km) west of the I-65 interchange at Cave City via KY 70, which is marked as a Kentucky Scenic Byway through the community. KY 70 and KY 255 respectively leads westward and northwestward into Edmonson County while also entering the national park.

== Business and economy ==
Due to the community's location between the national park boundary and Cave City, the general area of Highland Springs plays host to a few roadside tourist attractions, a hotel and a few gift shops. Most of the area's businesses, including lodging and restaurants in the area are located in nearby Cave City and, to a lesser extent, Park City, another nearby community.

== Points of interest ==
The nearest point of interest outside of local gift shops and accommodations is the Sand Cave, on the southeastern edge of the National Park.

== Education ==
Students in the community attend the institutions of the Caverna Independent School District in nearby Cave City and Horse Cave.
