= Chaumont, Kentucky =

Chaumont
- Ghost town
- Location within the state of Kentucky
- Coordinates: 37°7′43.17″N 86°3′59.92″W
- Country: United States
- State: Kentucky
- Counties: Edmonson; Barren
- Elevation: 853 ft (260 m)
- Time zone: UTC-6 (Central (CST))
  - Summer (DST): UTC-5 (CST)
- Area codes: 270 and 364
- GNIS feature ID: 507689

Chaumont is a ghost town in far eastern Edmonson County, Kentucky, United States. Located on the county's eastern boundary with Barren County, it was one of several communities that dissolved for their area to become a portion of Mammoth Cave National Park.

== History ==
=== Early settlement ===
The community of Chaumont shares the name of a French family that settled in the area at some point in the late 1800s. It was a farming community that consisted of a grist mill, a general store, post office, a church, a school building and a blacksmith shop, not to mention a few dozen homes. The Chaumont Milling Company was a successful local business that operated during the heyday of the town.

=== Demise ===
Between 1933 and 1936, the National Park Service (NPS) began purchasing the farmsteads in the areas using funds donated by the Mammoth Cave National Park Association, a private organization that was formed in Bowling Green by private wealthy citizens in 1925; other tracts were acquired by means of eminent domain. Like those of other nearby communities such as Union City, Elko, and Good Springs, all of Chaumont's residents were relocated from the area no later than 1937 or 1938. The Edmonson County half of the area where the community was located had officially become a portion of Mammoth Cave National Park upon its dedication on July 1, 1941, while some nearby households on the Barren County side were left intact as they were just outside of the park's final boundary.

=== Wondering Woods ===
About 30 years after Mammoth Cave became a National Park, the community had a sense of a revival in the form of a tourist attraction. The Village of Wondering Woods, later known as The Historic Wondering Woods and Tranquil Valley Village, was a living history museum that operated on a site just outside of park boundaries on the Barren County side of the Chaumont area during the summer months. The museum operated from around 1973 through as late as the Summer of 1992. It featured replicas of the milling company, a covered bridge, a doctor's office with early-20th century medical equipment, a school house and the Locust Grove Methodist Episcopalian Church. It also featured live entertainment by regionally and nationally known country musicians such as Bobby Mackey, and Minnie Pearl, and several gospel music bands such as The Estes Family, and several others; their performances at the village were usually tied in to festivals held each operating season. A tour of a cave on the property was later added, and a trolley was added to the attraction in 1987. The Wondering Woods village property was donated to the Conservation Fund in 1992, only to be given to the NPS. After the attraction closed down after the 1992 operating season, most of the buildings were demolished in December 2003. However, in 2019, the park service purchased the property where the Wondering Woods village stood in order to bring back the tours of the cave that were once offered as part of the attraction. The tour of the Wondering Woods cave is guided, and requires a round trip bus ride with a park ranger from the Mammoth Cave National Park visitor center to the site as access to the site of the former theme park is restricted to the public.

=== Present day ===
Aside of very few ruins of the old Wondering Woods and Tranquil Valley Village (one building is now serving as a bat sanctuary) and the Wondering Woods cave (which is accessible only through a cave tour group), the Locust Grove Cemetery is the only remaining landmark of the town that still remains intact in the present day.

== Geography ==
Chaumont is located about 7 miles (11 km) west of Cave City, and 2 miles (3.2 km) northwest of Park City at the present-day junction of Kentucky Route 70 (KY 70) and KY 255; portions of both highways west and south of Chaumont are currently considered a part of the Mammoth Cave Parkway.

At the time that the town dissolved, KY 255 was the sole highway traversing the area until KY 70 was rerouted onto its current alignment through the southern segment of the park sometime in the early 1960s.

The community was also previously one of a few towns located along the Mammoth Cave Railroad, which ran from Park City (known as Glasgow Junction at the time) to Mammoth Cave until it ended service in 1929. The Mammoth Cave Hike and Bike Trail runs through the area on most of the railroad's original path.

== In popular culture ==
The Historic Wondering Woods village was an ideal location for filming two movies; it was one of two locations (the other was the Kentucky River at Fort Boonesborough State Park) where the 1975 musical film, The World Through the Eyes of Children, was filmed in 1974. The village was also one of two locations (the other was the Cumberland Gap area) where the 1988 comedy film, Big Business, was filmed in September 1987.
