= Bon Ayr, Kentucky =

Unincorporated community in Kentucky, United States

Bon Ayr
- Unincorporated community
- Location within the state of Kentucky Bon Ayr (the United States)
- Coordinates: 37°1′28″N 86°3′32″W
- Country: United States
- State: Kentucky
- County: Barren
- Elevation: 768 ft (234 m)
- Time zone: UTC-6 (Central (CST))
  - Summer (DST): UTC-5 (CST)
- GNIS feature ID: 507546

Bon Ayr is an unincorporated community in Barren County, Kentucky, United States. It was also known as Bonayer.

== Geography ==
Bon Ayr is located in west-central Barren County at the crossroads intersection of U.S. Route 68 (which runs concurrently with Kentucky Route 80) and Kentucky Route 255. It is located about 5.5 miles (8.9 km) west-northwest of Glasgow.

== History ==
Bon Ayr had a post office from 1890 to 1904.
