= Willailla, Kentucky =

Unincorporated community in Kentucky, United States

Willailla
- Unincorporated community
- Location within the state of Kentucky Willailla (the United States)
- Coordinates: 37°18′16″N 84°27′47″W
- Country: United States
- State: Kentucky
- County: Rockcastle
- Elevation: 1,099 ft (335 m)
- Time zone: UTC-5 (Eastern (EST))
  - Summer (DST): UTC-4 (EST)
- GNIS feature ID: 509372

Willailla is an unincorporated community in Rockcastle County, Kentucky, United States. It is located at the junction of Kentucky Route 70 and Kentucky Route 3273. It was named for the constant illness of a resident named Will Owens.
