= Mammoth Cave Parkway =

Highway in Kentucky, United States

Mammoth Cave Parkway

Route information
- Maintained by NPS
- Length: 8.4 mi (13.5 km)

Major junctions
- North end: Visitor Center / Flint Ridge Road
- Green River Ferry Road; Cave City Road (KY 255); KY 70; KY 70 / KY 255 to Park City (KY 255 south); I-65 at Park City
- South end: US 31W at Park City

Location
- Country: United States
- Counties: Barren, Edmonson

Highway system
- Scenic Byways; National; National Forest; BLM; NPS
National Park Service Road

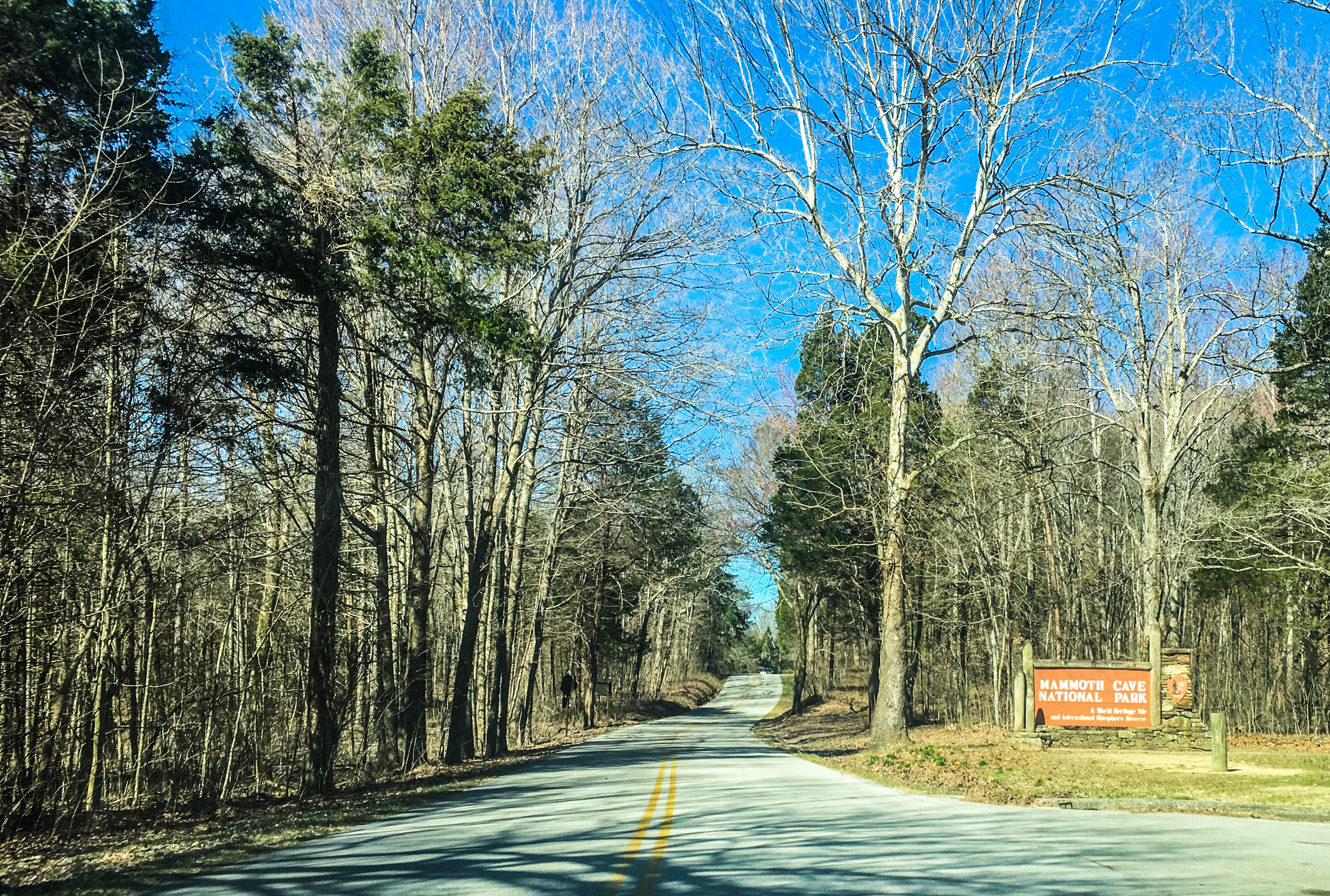
Mammoth Cave Parkway

The Mammoth Cave Parkway is a major roadway located in the Mammoth Cave National Park in west-central Kentucky. It encompasses parts of Kentucky Routes 70 and 255 within the park in northwestern Barren and eastern Edmonson Counties. It closely follows the Mammoth Cave Railroad Bike & Hike Trail.

== Route description ==
Mammoth Cave Parkway is marked by Kentucky Route 255 from U.S. Route 31W, through the I-65 exit 48 interchange. The Kentucky Transportation Cabinet maintains the road from US 31W to just beyond the I-65 interchange, while the NPS maintains the rest of the road beyond the I-65 junction. The road continues northward to the junction with Kentucky Route 70 (KY 70) near the Barren-Edmonson County line within the Mammoth Cave National Park.

At Chaumont, it turns left onto KY 70 westbound, while KY 255 begins a brief concurrency with KY 70 eastbound for a couple of miles back into Barren County. A little beyond the Sloan's Crossing Pond Trail, KY 70 westbound leaves the parkway by making a left turn towards Brownsville, while the Mammoth Cave Parkway continues north to end at the Visitor Center beyond the crossroad intersection with East Entrance and Carmichael Roads and intersections with Green River Ferry and Flint Ridge Roads. The parkway ends in the Visitor Center parking lot and an intersection with an access road to the park's woodland cottages.

The segment between Brownsville Road and Green River Ferry Road is part of the Duncan Hines Scenic Byway, one of the routes of the Kentucky Scenic Byways system.

=== Attractions along the route ===
- Diamond Caverns
- Locust Grove Cemetery
- Sloan's Crossing Pond Trail
- Doyle Valley Scenic Overlook
- Mammoth Cave Campground and Caver's Camp Store
- Hercules and Coach No. 2
- Mammoth Cave National Park Visitor Center

== History ==
The Mammoth Cave Parkway was originally built alongside the original path of the Mammoth Cave Railroad (1886–1931), which ran from the original town of Mammoth Cave to Park City (originally known as Glasgow Junction).

When the Mammoth Cave Parkway first opened (as a local road), portions of the road — along with Cave City Road (also known as East Entrance Road), a small piece of Green River Ferry Road, and all of Joppa Ridge Road west of the visitor center — were part of the original alignment of KY 70 from 1929 until the early 1960s, when KY 70 was re-routed to its current alignment within the park. The road became maintained by the National Park Service once Mammoth Cave became a national park.

In 2004, both of Mammoth Cave Parkway's junctions with KY 70 were reconstructed just before the completion of the Mammoth Cave Railroad Bike and Hike Trail.

== Major intersections ==
County	Location	mi	km	Destinations	Notes
Barren	Park City	0.000	0.000	US 31W (Louisville Road/Second Street) / KY 255 south – Cave City, Bowling Green	Southern terminus; KY 255 continuation south of Park City after running concurrently with US 31W; southern end of KY 255 concurrency
Barren	Park City	0.402	0.647	I-65 – Louisville, Nashville	I-65 exit 48
Edmonson	Mammoth Cave	2.4	3.9	KY 70 east / KY 255 north to I-65 – Cave City	Northern end of KY 255 concurrency; southern end of KY 70 concurrency
Edmonson	Mammoth Cave	4.9	7.9	KY 70 west (Brownsville Road) – Brownsville	Northern end of KY 70 concurrency
Edmonson	Mammoth Cave			Cave City Road; Carmichael Road (Official vehicles only)	
Edmonson	Mammoth Cave	7.9	12.7	Green River Ferry Road – Maple Springs Maintenance Road – Ranger Station	Connects to KY 1352
Edmonson	Mammoth Cave	8.1	13.0	Mammoth Cave Campground	Campground and Caver's Camp Store
Edmonson	Mammoth Cave	8.2	13.2	Mammoth Cave Hotel Road	Mammoth Cave Hotel Entrance
Edmonson	Mammoth Cave	8.3	13.4	Flint Ridge Road east – Dennison Ferry	Connects to KY 218; Flint Ridge Road closed during winter months
Edmonson	Mammoth Cave	8.4	13.5	Mammoth Cave Tours/Visitor Center; Woodland Cottages	Northern terminus in the Visitor Center parking lot
1.000 mi = 1.609 km; 1.000 km = 0.621 mi: Concurrency terminus
