= Kentucky Route 304 =

State highway in Kentucky, United States

Kentucky Route 304
- KY 304 highlighted in red

Route information
- Maintained by KYTC
- Length: 0.713 mi (1,147 m)
- Existed: 2009–present

Major junctions
- West end: US 431 / KY 70 in Central City
- East end: KY 1031 in Central City

Location
- Country: United States
- State: Kentucky
- Counties: Muhlenberg

Highway system
- Kentucky State Highway System; Interstate; US; State; Parkways
← KY 303	→ KY 305

Kentucky Route 304 (KY 304) is a state highway in Central City in Muhlenberg County, Kentucky. The highway runs 0.713 miles (1.147 km) from U.S. Route 431 (US 431) and KY 70 east to KY 1031. KY 304 replaced part of KY 70 through downtown Central City in 2009.

== Route description ==
KY 304 begins at the intersection of Front Street and Phillip Stone Way west of downtown Central City. US 431 follows Phillip Stone Way through the intersection, and KY 70 heads west along Front Street and south concurrently with US 431. KY 304 heads east along Front Street, which gradually approaches the east–west Paducah & Louisville Railway line. At closest approach, the highway turns north onto West Reservoir Avenue for a brief concurrency with KY 277. KY 304 turns east onto Broad Street and veers northeast at its intersection with KY 2103 (Center Street). The highway has a grade crossing of CSX's O&N Subdivision rail line before reaching its eastern terminus at KY 1031 (2nd Street). The Kentucky Transportation Cabinet classifies KY 304 as a state secondary highway.

== History ==
The Kentucky Transportation Cabinet established KY 304 through a February 6, 2009, official order to replace part of KY 70 when KY 70 was rerouted with US 431 to bypass downtown Central City.

The original KY 304 went from US 23 (now KY 321) in Auxier east and south to US 23 (now KY 1428) in Lancer, with an eastern section from Meta northward to Gulnore; this eastern section became part of KY 194 in 1965. In 1970, only a short section in Auxier remained, as most of the route was replaced by an extended KY 3 (now KY 302). This section was deleted on December 15, 1988, and became part of rerouted KY 3, while KY 302 was extended south on the old route of KY 3. However, when KY 3 was rerouted off of this road on December 2, 1996, this road became an extension of KY 3051 instead.

== Major intersections ==
The entire route is in Central City, Muhlenberg County.

mi	km	Destinations	Notes
0.000	0.000	US 431 / KY 70 (Phillip Stone Way) – Russellville, Owensboro	Western terminus
0.402	0.647	KY 277 south (West Reservoir Avenue)	West end of concurrency with KY 277
0.438	0.705	KY 277 north (West Reservoir Avenue)	East end of concurrency with KY 277
0.510	0.821	KY 2103 south (Center Street)	
0.713	1.147	KY 1031 (2nd Street)	Eastern terminus
1.000 mi = 1.609 km; 1.000 km = 0.621 mi: Concurrency terminus
