= Kentucky Scenic Byways =

Official designation in Kentucky, United States

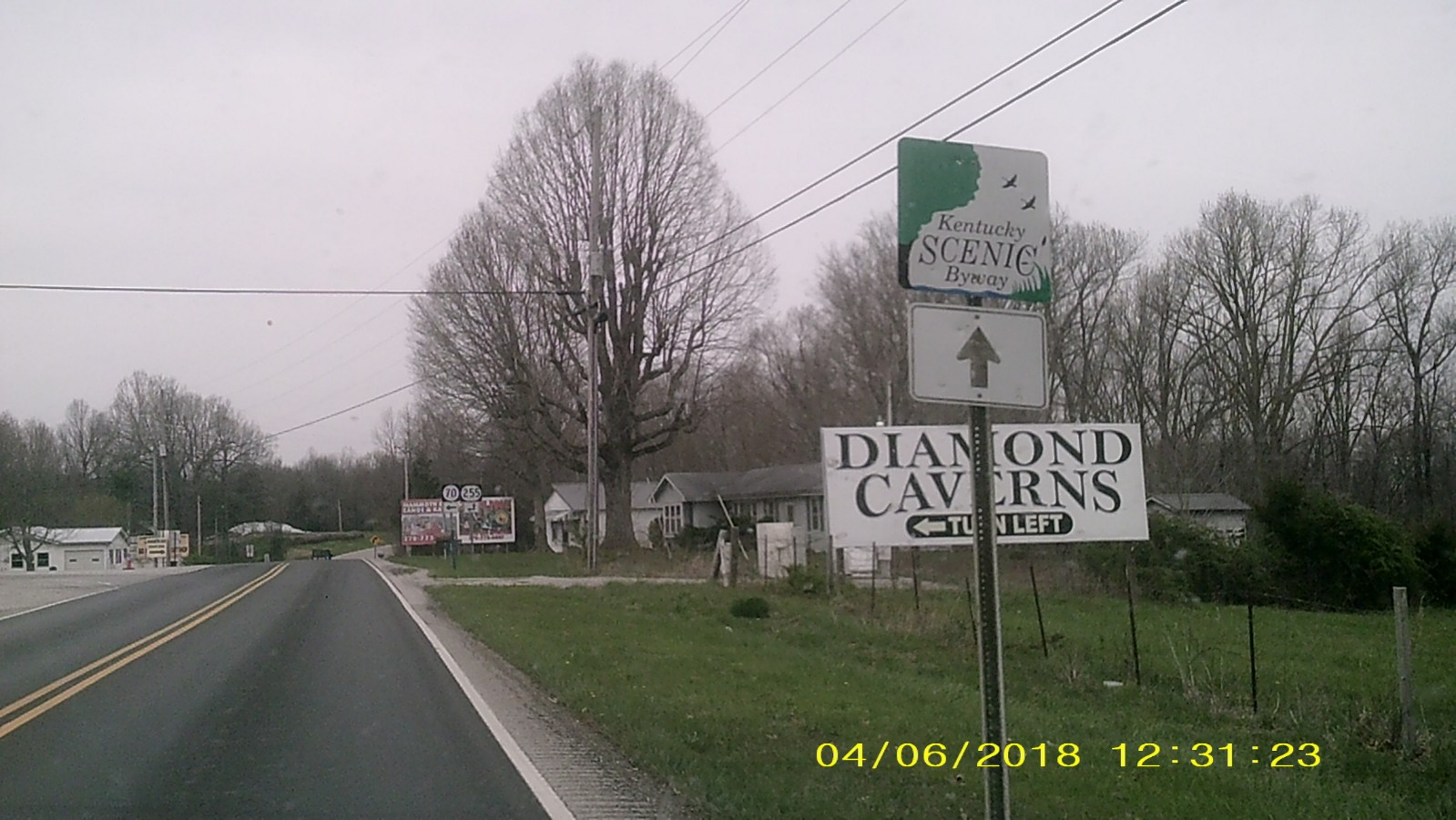
- Kentucky Scenic Byway signage on KY 70 near Highland Springs, Kentucky

System information
- Length: 1,346.405 mi (2,166.829 km)
- Formed: October 1994; 31 years ago

Highway names
- Interstates: Interstate X (I-X)
- US Highways: US Highway X (US X)
- State: Kentucky Route X (KY X)

System links
- Kentucky State Highway System; Interstate; US; State; Parkways

The Kentucky Scenic Byway System is a system of tourist routes in the U.S. state of Kentucky. It consists of roads in the state that travel through areas of scenic, historic, and cultural significance. The state's scenic byway system was initiated in October 1994, and it presently includes 34 designated byways, including three national scenic byways. As of 2007, the total mileage of all scenic byways in Kentucky includes up to 1,346.405 miles (2,166.829 km) worth of state highways and local roadways. The byway system is controlled by the Kentucky Transportation Cabinet and governed by Kentucky Revised Statutes 177.571-177.576.

The intent of this system is to provide travelers with a safe and interesting alternate route. Some of the state scenic byway system even includes some select county-maintained roads, depending on the byway. The state's scenic byway shield features a tree on the left half of the sign with a couple of black birds flying from it.

== Byways ==
=== Nationally-designated byways ===
Byway/Highway name	Counties	Routes involved	Route description	Length
Country Music Highway	Greenup, Boyd, Lawrence, Johnson, Floyd, Pike, Letcher	US 23 / US 119	US 23 From Greenup to Jenkins and US 119 to Whitesburg	144.085 miles (231.882 km)
Great River Road National Route	Fulton, Hickman, Carlisle, Ballard	US 51 / KY 94 / KY 123 / KY 239 / KY 1203	KY 94 from the Tennessee state line to Hickman and Cayce, KY 123 to Columbus to northern Carlisle County, US 51 from KY 1203 to the Ohio River near Cairo, Illinois	40.375 miles (64.977 km)
Great River Road Alternate	Fulton, Hickman, Carlisle	US 51 / KY 80 / KY 125 / KY 166 / KY 1648	KY 125 and KY 166 from Hickman to Fulton, US 51 from Fulton to Clinton to KY 1203 Junction north of Bardwell	22.875 miles (36.814 km)
Lincoln Heritage Scenic Highway	LaRue, Nelson, Washington, Boyle	US 62 / US 31E / US 150 / US 150 Bus.	US 31E from the Abraham Lincoln Birthplace N.H.P. in Hodgenville to Bardstown, US 150 to Danville	71.2 miles (114.6 km)
Red River Gorge Scenic Byway	Menifee, Powell, Wolfe	KY 11 / KY 15 / KY 77 / KY 715	Beginning on KY 11 east of Stanton extending through the Red River Gorge, along Pine Ridge on KY 715, back to Slade on KY 77, then along KY 11 south to the Lee County Line at Zachariah.	45.009 miles (72.435 km)
Wilderness Road Heritage Highway	Bell, Knox, Laurel, Rockcastle, Madison	US 25 / US 25E / KY 229	US 25-E from the Cumberland Gap Tunnel to Bailey's Switch, KY 229 to US 25 junction at London, US 25 to Berea	93.776 miles (150.918 km)
Woodlands Trace National Scenic Byway	Lyon, Trigg	KY 453 (FD-100)	KY 453 via Grand Rivers, FD-100 southward to the Tennessee state line in southwest Trigg County	30.00 miles (48.28 km) (within Kentucky)

=== State-designated byways ===
==== Statewide ====
- U.S. Route 68 Scenic Byway - involving most of the entire route of US 68 from Reidland to Maysville; including the small sections of the highway that were already designated as a state scenic byway. It runs through six (6) tourism regions.

==== Bluegrass, Blues, and Barbecue (Northwest Kentucky) ====
The byways in this region are part of a group of scenic byways, the Blues to Bluegrass Scenic Byways.

Byway/Highway name	Counties	Routes involved	Description	Length
Bill Monroe Bluegrass Trail	Ohio, Daviess, Hancock	US 60 / US 62 / US 231 / KY 54 / KY 69 / KY 85 / KY 334 / KY 657 / KY 1164 / KY 1544 / KY 3092	Rockport to Hartford to Rosine, to Fordsville, to Hawesville/Lewisport to Owensboro to the Daviess/McLean County line.	111.581 miles (179.572 km)
Everly Brothers Rock-N-Roll Trail	Muhlenberg, McLean, Webster	US 41 / US 41 Alt. / US 62 / US 431 / KY 70 / KY 56 / KY 81 / KY 132 / KY 136 / KY 189 / KY 1031 / KY 176 / KY 1380	KY 56 from the Union/Webster County line to US 41A, US 41A to Dixon, KY 132 to Sebree, KY 136 to Calhoun, KY 81 to South Carrollton, US 431 and KY 1031 to Central City, US 431/KY 70 to Drakesboro, KY 176 to Greenville, US 62 through Powderly to Central City to Muhlenberg/Ohio County line	99.86 miles (160.71 km)
W.C. Handy Blues Trail	Daviess, Henderson, Union	US 41A / US 60 / KY 56	US 60 from Owensboro to Morganfield, KY 56 to Union/Webster County line	59.525 miles (95.796 km)

==== Caves, Lakes, and Corvettes (South Central Kentucky) ====
Byway/Highway name	Counties	Routes involved	Route description	Length
Cordell Hull Highway	Barren and Monroe	KY 70 / KY 90 / US 31E / US 31E Bus. / US 68 Bus. / KY 63 / KY 163	KY 255 from the Mammoth Cave National Park boundary to KY 70 junction, KY 70 east to Cave City, KY 90 to Glasgow, US 31E and US 68 Bus to downtown Glasgow, US 31E Business and KY 63 to Tompkinsville, KY 163 from Tompkinsville to the Tennessee state line	51.584 miles (83.016 km)
Duncan Hines Scenic Byway	Edmonson; Warren	US 31W / US 68 / KY 80 / KY 101 / KY 259 / KY 70 / KY 187 / KY 238 / KY 728 / KY 1827 / KY 1352 / KY 2325, Mammoth Cave Parkway, Green River Ferry Road, Rocky Hill Road, Sixth Street (Smiths Grove), Smiths Grove-Oakland Road, Oakland Road	From Bowling Green via US 31W and KY 101 to Rhoda, KY 259 through Brownsville, KY 70 to Huff, KY 187 to Sunfish, KY 238 to Bee Spring, Mammoth Cave NP via KY 728, KY 1827, and Nolin Lake Dam, Green River Ferry, MC Parkway, KY 70, KY 2325, to near Pig to Rocky Hill, Smiths Grove and Oakland via locally maintained roads.	65.724 miles (105.773 km)
Highway 100 Scenic Drive	Logan, Simpson, Allen, Monroe, and Cumberland	KY 100	Entire KY 100 corridor from Russellville to just east of Marrowbone	95.404 miles (153.538 km)

==== Kentucky's Derby Region (North Central Kentucky) ====
Byway/Highway name	Counties	Routes involved	Route description	Length
Abraham Lincoln Heritage Highway	Boyle, Nelson, Washington	US 150	US 150 from Bardstown to Danville	34 miles (55 km)
Old Kentucky Turnpike	LaRue, Nelson	US 31E / US 62 / US 150	From Abraham Lincoln Birthplace to the entrance of My Old Kentucky Home State Park	28.059 miles (45.157 km)
River Road	Jefferson (Metro Louisville)	River Road	From US 42 in northeast Louisville to the Zorn Avenue intersection	7 miles (11 km)
US 42 in Oldham County	Oldham	US 42	US 42's entire course through Oldham County	14.767 miles (23.765 km)

==== Bluegrass Region (East-central Kentucky) ====
Byway/Highway name	Counties	Routes involved	Route description	Length
Boone Creek Scenic Byway	Fayette, Clark County	KY 418, Grimes Mill Road, McCalls Mill Road	Loop around two back roads off KY 418 near Athens	8.6 miles (13.8 km)
Pigsah Pike	Woodford	KY 1967	From US 60 north to KY 1681	5.069 miles (8.158 km)
Rice, VanMeter, and Elk Chester Roads	Fayette	KY 1969	All three specified roads on west side of Lexington off US 60 (Versailles Road)	6.295 miles (10.131 km)
Russell Cave Road	Fayette	KY 353	From KY 1973 to Hughes Lane	2.461 miles (3.961 km)
Old Frankfort Pike	Fayette, Franklin, Woodford	KY 1681	Entire corridor from near Frankfort to downtown Lexington	14.541 miles (23.401 km)
Old Richmond Road and Grimes Mill Road	Fayette	US 25 / US 421	Grimes Mill Road, then following US 25/421 to the KY 418 junction	6.8 miles (10.9 km)
Versailles to Midway Road	Woodford	US 62	from Versailles to Midway	6.3 miles (10.1 km)
Winchester Road Corridor	Fayette, Clark	US 60	Winchester Road connecting the eastern outskirts of Lexington to the Clark County line	4.8 miles (7.7 km)

==== Southern Kentucky Vacations (Southeast Central Kentucky) ====
Byway/Highway name	Counties	Routes involved	Route description	Length
Cumberland Cultural Heritage Byway	Metcalfe, Green, Taylor, Adair, Cumberland, Clinton, Wayne, Russell, McCreary, Pulaski, Lincoln, Boyle	US 27 / US 127 / US 150 / KY 55 / KY 61 / KY 78 / KY 90 / KY 163	KY 90 from Cumberland Falls S.R.P. to Monticello to Beaumont (including KY 90's concurrencies with US 27, US 127, and KY 61), KY 163 from Beaumont to US 68/KY 80 at Edmonton, KY 80 to Columbia to Russell Springs, and US 127 to Danville, US 150 to Stanford, and KY 78 back to US 127 at Hustonville	187.201 miles (301.271 km)
Zollicoffer-Thomas Scenic Byway	Pulaski and Wayne	KY 235 (Old Mill Springs Battlefield Road)	Entire corridor	10.36 miles (16.67 km)

==== Daniel Boone Country (Southeastern Kentucky) ====
Byway/Highway name	Counties	Routes involved	Route description	Length
Ridgetop Scenic Byway	Rockcastle, Laurel, Jackson, Estill	KY 89	From KY 490 near Lamero to McKee to Irvine to the Estill/Clark County line	35.517 miles (57.159 km)

==== Kentucky's Appalachians (Eastern Kentucky) ====
Byway/Highway name	Counties	Routes involved	Route description	Length
Black Mountain Scenic Byway	Harlan	KY 160	From Benham and Lynch to the Virginia state line	10.341 miles (16.642 km)
Pine Mountain Road	Letcher	US 119	From KY 15 junction in Whitesburg to KY 806 junction near Oven Fork	8.153 miles (13.121 km)
Red River Gorge Scenic Byways	Menifee, Powell, Wolfe	KY 11 / KY 15 / KY 213 / KY 77 / KY 715	Various sections of specified highways in the aforementioned highways	45.009 miles (72.435 km)

==== Northern Kentucky River Region ====
Byway/Highway name	Counties	Routes involved	Route description	Length
Big Bone Lick Scenic Highway	Boone	KY 338 / KY 2852 / KY 536 / KY 18	Big Bone to Commissary Corner via Rabbit Hash	19.931 miles (32.076 km)
Riverboat Row	Campbell	Riverboat Row	James Taylor Drive to KY 8 (Riverside Drive) in Newport	1 mile (1.6 km)
