= Haywood, Kentucky =

Unincorporated community in Kentucky, United States

Haywood
- Unincorporated community
- Location within the state of Kentucky Haywood (the United States)
- Coordinates: 36°56′46″N 85°58′28″W
- Country: United States
- State: Kentucky
- County: Barren
- Elevation: 751 ft (229 m)
- Time zone: UTC-6 (Central (CST))
  - Summer (DST): UTC-5 (CST)
- ZIP codes: 42141
- GNIS feature ID: 493941

Haywood is an unincorporated community in Barren County, Kentucky, United States. Its post office closed in October 1934.
