= Diamond Caverns =

Cave in Kentucky, United States

Coordinates: 37.116°N 86.062°W

Diamond Caverns in Park City, Kentucky, United States, was discovered on July 14, 1859.

== History ==
On July 14, 1859, a slave of landowner Jessie Coats discovered a pit in the floor of a valley near the road to Mammoth Cave. The cave was given its name when the first visitor thought the calcite formations looked like diamonds. The next day, a survey crew entered the newly discovered cave, and works on turning it into an attraction began. The Kennedy Bridal Party was the first to experience the freshly opened display cave on August 19, 1859, after a month of labor constructing the cave for visits. The cave has been a tourist attraction for over 160 years, with the exception of brief periods during the Civil War. Gary and Susan Berdeaux, Larry and Mayo McCarty, Roger and Carol McClure, Stanley and Kay Sides, and Gordon and Judy Smith (five cavers and their wives), bought the cave property on July 7, 1999, and remain the current owners of the cavern.

== Geology ==
The cave is mostly limestone, which was laid in the late Mississippian Period when most of Kentucky was under a shallow warm sea. There are also large deposits of calcite. Fresh water dissolves the limestone, and then deposits the mineral as the water itself loses its acidic nature. Other speleothems (formations) which can be viewed at Diamond Caverns include: Soda Straws, Stalactite, Columns, Flowstone, Drapery/Bacon Strip, and Cave Pearl.

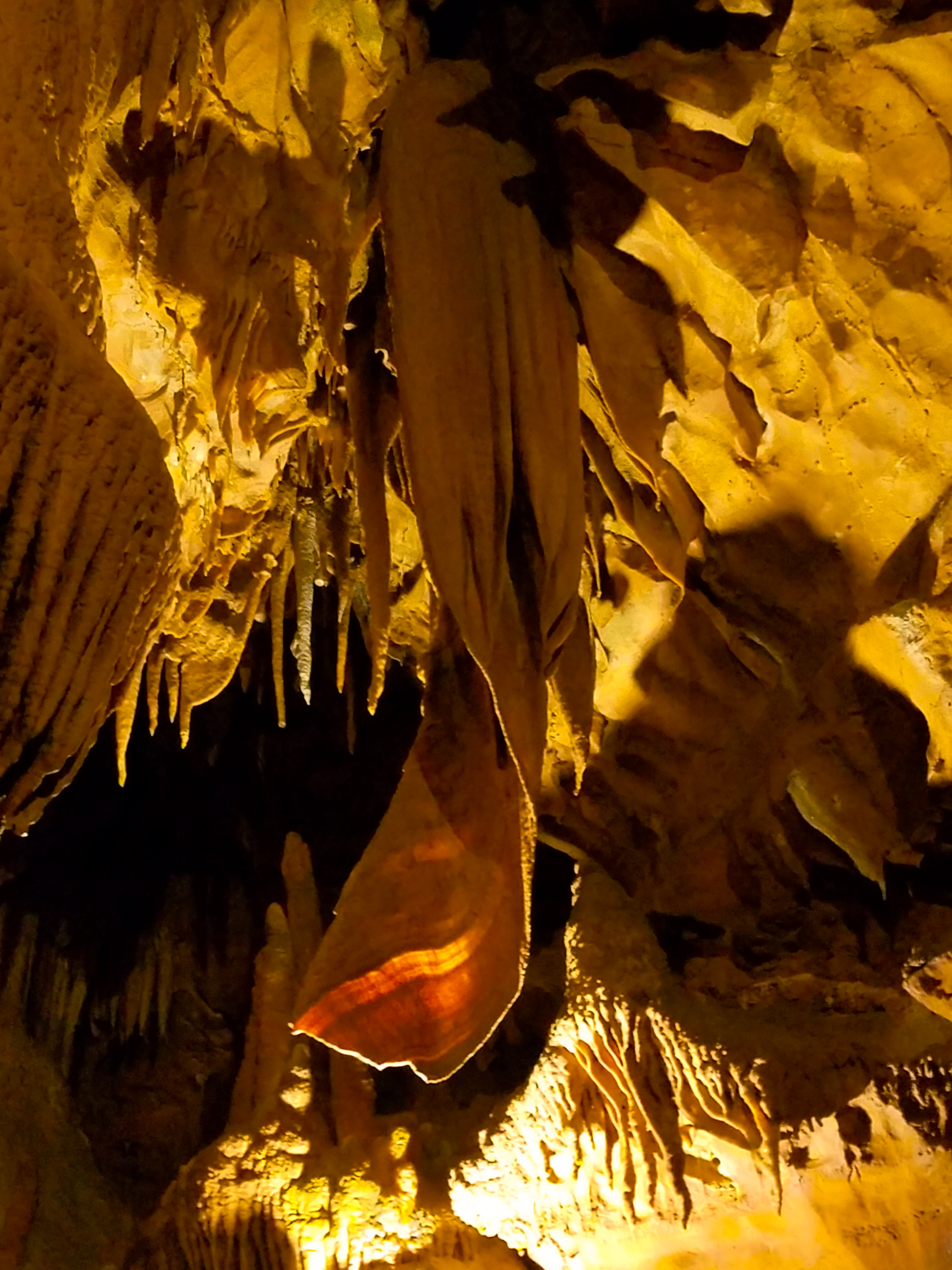
Thin Flowstone Speleothem a.k.a. Cave Bacon

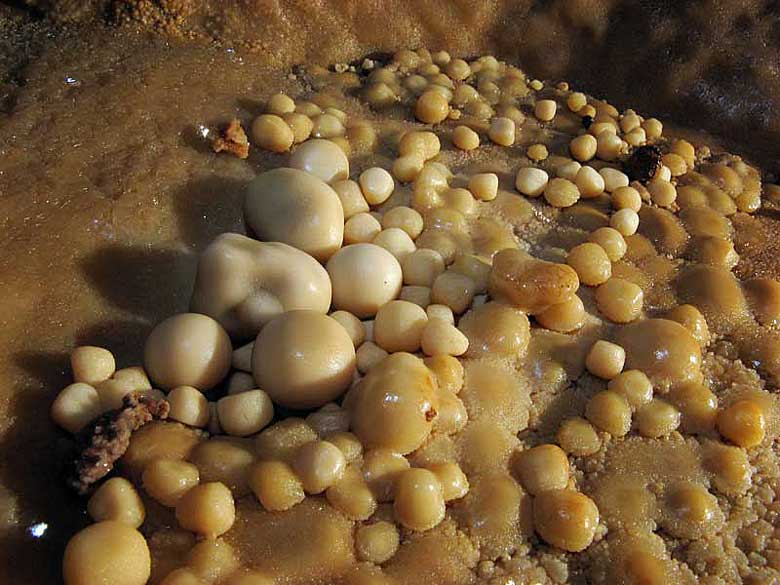
Cave Pearl formation, New Discovery - Diamond Caverns, Park City, Kentucky

=== Chemical process ===
Calcite deposition is caused mainly by degassing. The amount of carbon dioxide in the groundwater entering the cave entrance is almost 250 times that of the air. Calcite cannot persist without carbon dioxide, and chemical reactions are reversing.

Ca+2 +2(HCO^{−}_{3}) (in solution) → CO_{2}(gas) + H_{2}O(water) + CaCO_{3} (calcite)

Calcite is then deposited. Calcite is known by various names depending on the shape it acquires. The calcite in the Diamond Caverns is known as Travertine. Dripstone is a phrase used by cavers to describe any cave décor created by water dripping, splashing, or seeping.

=== Cave origin ===
1. The Pole Canyon Limestone, which comprises Lehman Caves, was formed. This rock stratum began as limestone around 550 million years ago near the equator in a sea. This limestone layer was frequently buried and uncovered, and the rock layers eventually moved north to their current site. The rock was subjected to heat and pressure during the Basin and Range province formation, resulting in a low-grade marble. The force produced fissures in the granite during the mountain-building process.
2. Warm acidic water from below (hypogenic) dissolved corridors and rooms through holes in the rock. The result was cavities in the rock. This breakdown occurred near the water table's top edge.
3. The prior phase is sometimes referred to as the "hollowing out phase," whereas the third phase is sometimes referred to as the "filling in phase." As the water table lowered, part of the marble above the cave was dissolved away as surface water percolated through soil and organic detritus and became mildly acidic. When calcite-rich water reaches the air-filled channels, it forms a variety of speleothems.
4. The "filling in phase" very recently discovered this final phase. Many of the speleothems in Lehman Caves appear to have been eaten away as you go through them. The formation of speleothems is due to high carbon dioxide air during certain seasons, which dissolves speleothems and marble. As the climate became drier, this process may have only begun in the last ten thousand years.

== Ecology ==
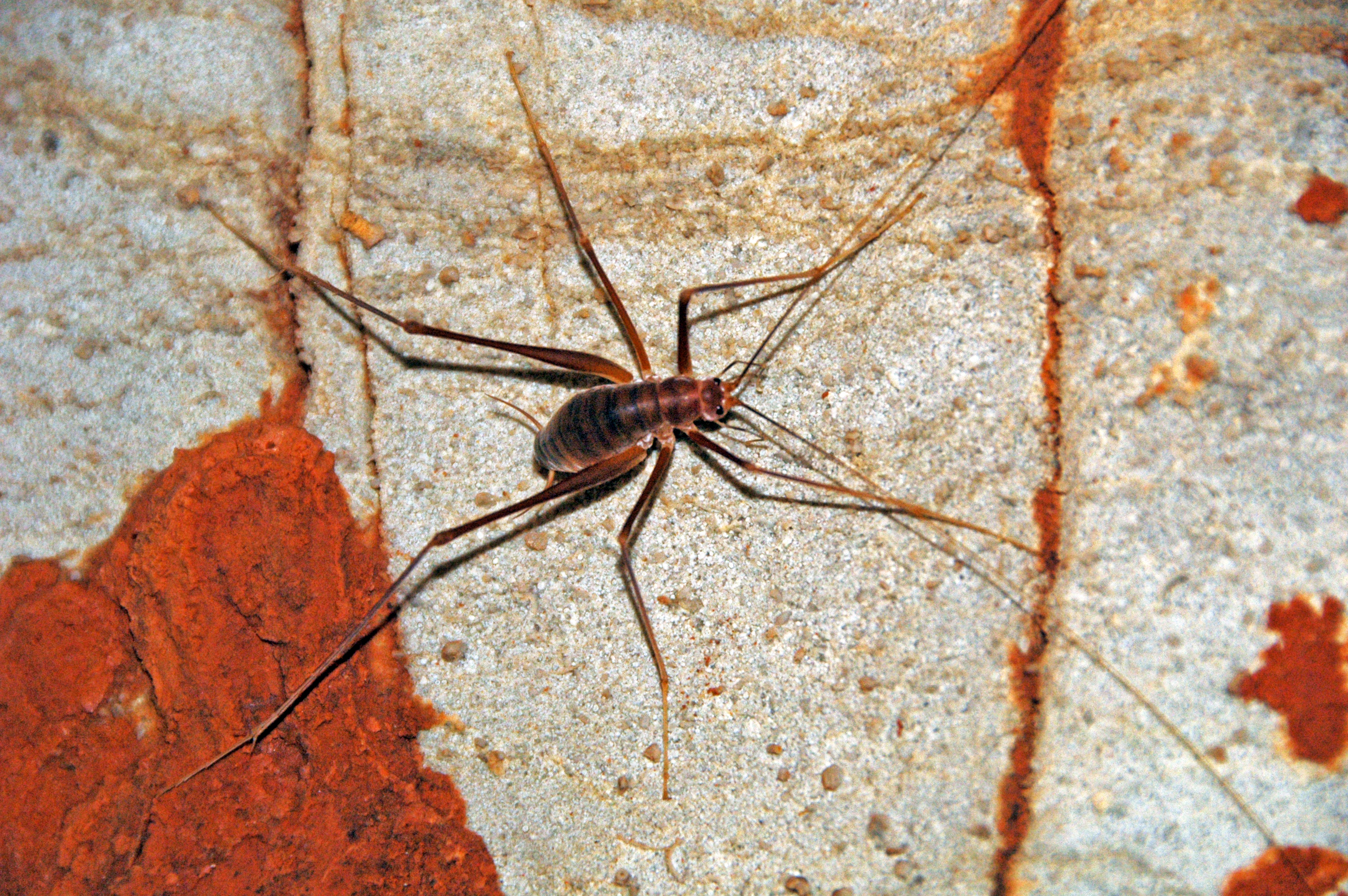
Cave cricket was encountered on a cave wall in Diamond Caverns, Kentucky.

The temperature is constant, changing only a few degrees over the course of a year. This is due to the fact that the earth's surface warms and cools with the seasons, and by the time the impacts of all the hot and cold days reach Diamond Caverns, the temperature has been averaged. The cavern consist of many species like crickets, beetles, spiders, snakes, mice, crayfish and salamander.

== Tourism ==
Diamond Caverns is open year-round and offering cave tours to visitors from all over the world. The temperature remains 58 degrees year-round in the cave, and the tour itself is about a half-mile long. However, the pathways are concrete and have handrails that are not handicap accessible. Inside the cave, LED artistically placed lights illuminate the pathways.
