= Kentucky Route 1031 =

State highway in Kentucky, United States

Kentucky Route 1031
- Second Street
- KY 1031 highlighted in red

Route information
- Maintained by KYTC
- Length: 3.203 mi (5.155 km)
- Existed: 2011–present

Major junctions
- South end: US 431 / US 62 / KY 70 in Central City
- KY 277 in Central City
- North end: US 431 near South Carrollton

Location
- Country: United States
- State: Kentucky
- Counties: Muhlenberg

Highway system
- Kentucky State Highway System; Interstate; US; State; Parkways
← KY 1030	→ KY 1032

Kentucky Route 1031 (KY 1031) is a 3.203-mile-long (5.155 km) state highway in Muhlenberg County, Kentucky. It runs from U.S. Route 62, U.S. Route 431, and Kentucky Route 70 in southern Central City to U.S. Route 431 south of South Carrollton via Central City.

== Route description ==
From the intersection of U.S. Route 431 (US 431), US 62, and KY 70, KY 1031 follows the original US 431 alignment through downtown Central City. It has intersections with two other state routes, KY 304, and then KY 277. It ends at an intersection with US 431 just south of South Carrollton.

== History ==
The route was originally an alignment of US 431 in downtown Central City, some of which was co-signed with KY 70. However, in 2011, it was rerouted to run concurrently with US 62 west and onto the former KY 189 Bypass (which was also originally the US 431 and KY 70 Truck routes) due to the low-clearance bridge carrying the Paducah and Louisville Railroad over the street in the central business district. After re-routing US 431 onto the bypass, this road received the KY 1031 designation, while KY 70's original alignment on Front Street into downtown became KY 304.

== Major intersections ==
The entire route is in Muhlenberg County.

Location	mi	km	Destinations	Notes
Calvert City	0.000	0.000	US 62 (Everly Brothers Boulevard) / US 431 / KY 70 (South Second Street) to Western Kentucky Parkway	Southern terminus
Calvert City	0.401	0.645	KY 304 west (East Broad Street) / East Broad Street	Eastern terminus of KY 304
Calvert City	0.684	1.101	KY 277 (East Reservoir Avenue)	
Calvert City	2.383	3.835	KY 602 south	Northern terminus of KY 602
	3.203	5.155	US 431	Northern terminus
1.000 mi = 1.609 km; 1.000 km = 0.621 mi
