= Park City, Kentucky =

- City
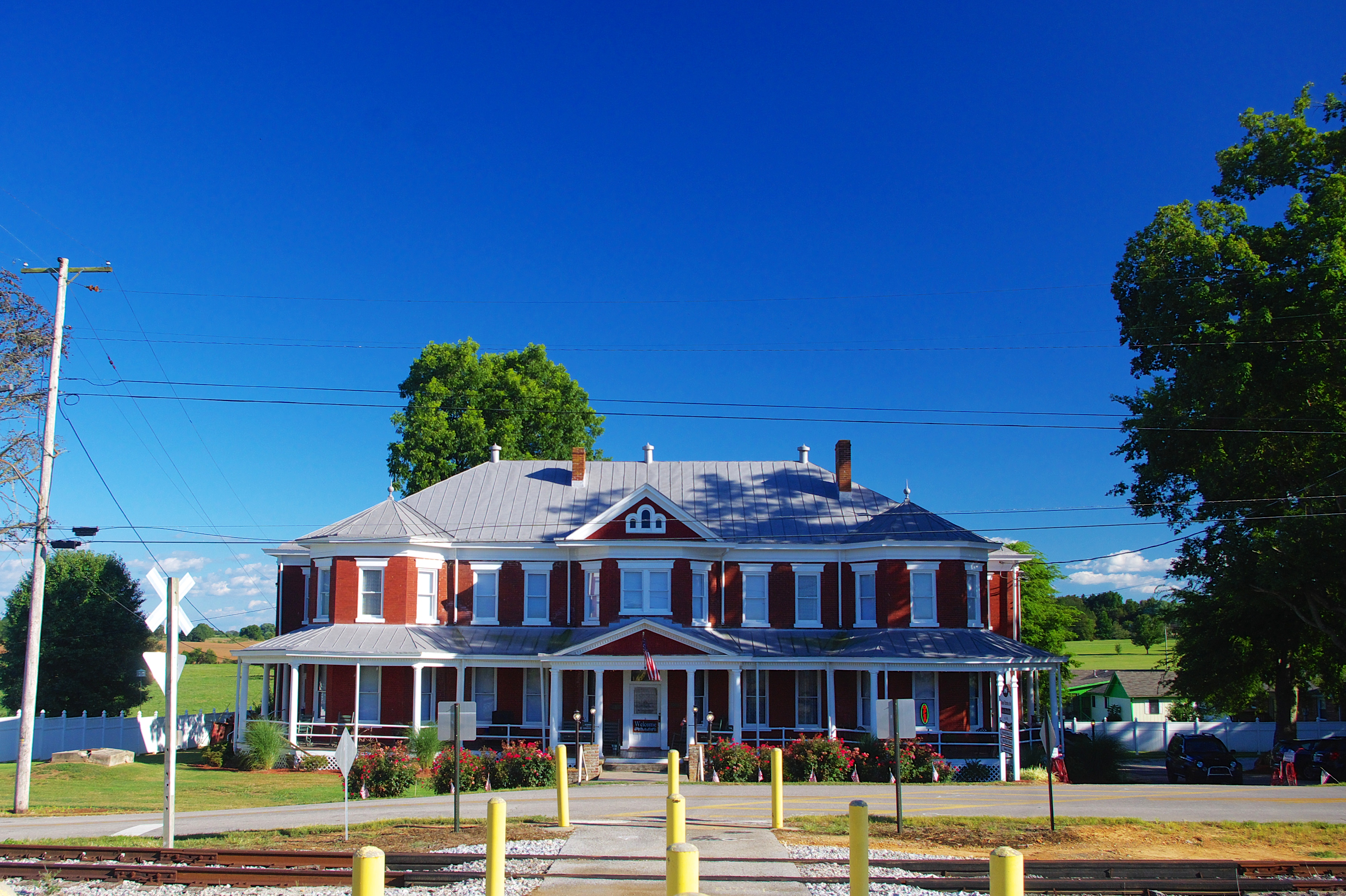
- Grand Victorian Inn in Park City

- Location of Park City in Barren County, Kentucky.
- Coordinates: 37°5′39″N 86°2′54″W
- Country: United States
- State: Kentucky
- County: Barren
- Incorporated: 1871
- Named for: nearby Mammoth Cave

Area
  - Total: 1.47 sq mi (3.81 km^{2})
  - Land: 1.47 sq mi (3.80 km^{2})
  - Water: 0.0039 sq mi (0.01 km^{2})
- Elevation: 640 ft (195 m)

Population (2020)
  - Total: 614
  - Density: 418.2/sq mi (161.48/km^{2})
- Time zone: UTC-6 (Central (CST))
  - Summer (DST): UTC-5 (CDT)
- ZIP code: 42160
- Area codes: 270 & 364
- FIPS code: 21-59232
- GNIS feature ID: 0500179
- Website: parkcity.ky.gov

Park City is a home rule-class city in Barren County, Kentucky, United States. The population was 614 at the 2020 census. It is the entrance to nearby Mammoth Cave National Park and to Diamond Caverns, a privately owned cave attraction. Exit 48 off I-65 is the only direct access exit to the Mammoth Cave National Park.

Park City is part of the Glasgow micropolitan area.

== History ==
In the early 19th century, the site of the present city was the junction of the Louisville and Nashville Pike with spur roads to Glasgow and Bardstown. By 1827, a stagecoach relay station had developed into a settlement with a post office named Three Forks. The postmaster William Bell owned a 1,500-acre (610 ha) plantation nearby, with a prominent tavern, which led to the community also being known as Bell's Station. In 1859, the mainline of the Louisville and Nashville Railroad reached the plantation, and in 1863 the Glasgow spur was completed. The community was then known as Glasgow Junction after the L&N Depot, which also served as the junction between the mainline and the Mammoth Cave Railroad. There was a close relationship between Mammoth Cave and Diamond Cave (Diamond Caverns) for years. Books and cave brochures would describe both caves. Beginning in 1880, the Mammoth Cave Railroad tracks were laid just west of Diamond Cave. When the line finally opened in 1886, Diamond was one of the primary stops on the railroad. Excursions were available to see Diamond and Mammoth Caves on the same day, and still return to Glasgow Junction in time to catch through trains to Louisville or Nashville. Mammoth Cave Railroad stops also served two nearby caves opened by Larkin Proctor, Long Cave, commercialized as Grand Avenue Caverns, and Proctor Cave. The city was platted and formally incorporated under that name in 1871.

In 1938, the name was changed to Park City to avoid confusion with Glasgow.

Part of the former Mammoth Cave Railroad was converted into a 9-mile hike and bike trail. The start of this trail can be accessed from Park City.

== Geography ==
Park City is located in western Barren County at 37°5′39″N 86°2′54″W (37.094181, -86.048309). U.S. Route 31W passes through the center of the city, and Interstate 65 cuts through the northwest corner, with access via Exit 48 (Kentucky Route 255/Mammoth Cave Parkway). The CSX Transportation rail line (former L&N) also passes through the center of the city.

According to the United States Census Bureau, the city has a total area of 1.5 square miles (3.8 km^{2}), of which 0.004 square miles (0.01 km^{2}), or 0.25%, is water.

== Demographics ==
Historical population
Census	Pop.	Note	%±
1890	217		—
1900	224		3.2%
1910	303		35.3%
1920	307		1.3%
1930	374		21.8%
1940	354		−5.3%
1950	448		26.6%
1960	497		10.9%
1970	567		14.1%
1980	614		8.3%
1990	549		−10.6%
2000	517		−5.8%
2010	537		3.9%
2020	614		14.3%
U.S. Decennial Census

As of the census of 2000, there were 517 people, 237 households, and 142 families residing in the city. The population density was 303.5 inhabitants per square mile (117.2/km^{2}). There were 263 housing units at an average density of 154.4 per square mile (59.6/km^{2}). The racial makeup of the city was 93.23% White, 6.38% African American, 0.19% from other races, and 0.19% from two or more races. Hispanic or Latino of any race were 0.58% of the population.

There were 237 households, out of which 27.0% had children under the age of 18 living with them, 48.5% were married couples living together, 8.9% had a female householder with no husband present, and 39.7% were non-families. 37.6% of all households were made up of individuals, and 20.7% had someone living alone who was 65 years of age or older. The average household size was 2.18 and the average family size was 2.91.

In the city, the population was spread out, with 21.3% under the age of 18, 7.2% from 18 to 24, 30.6% from 25 to 44, 22.2% from 45 to 64, and 18.8% who were 65 years of age or older. The median age was 40 years. For every 100 females, there were 92.9 males. For every 100 females age 18 and over, there were 85.0 males.

The median income for a household in the city was $25,313, and the median income for a family was $36,042. Males had a median income of $26,364 versus $17,778 for females. The per capita income for the city was $13,888. About 13.1% of families and 15.5% of the population were below the poverty line, including 13.6% of those under age 18 and 25.6% of those age 65 or over.

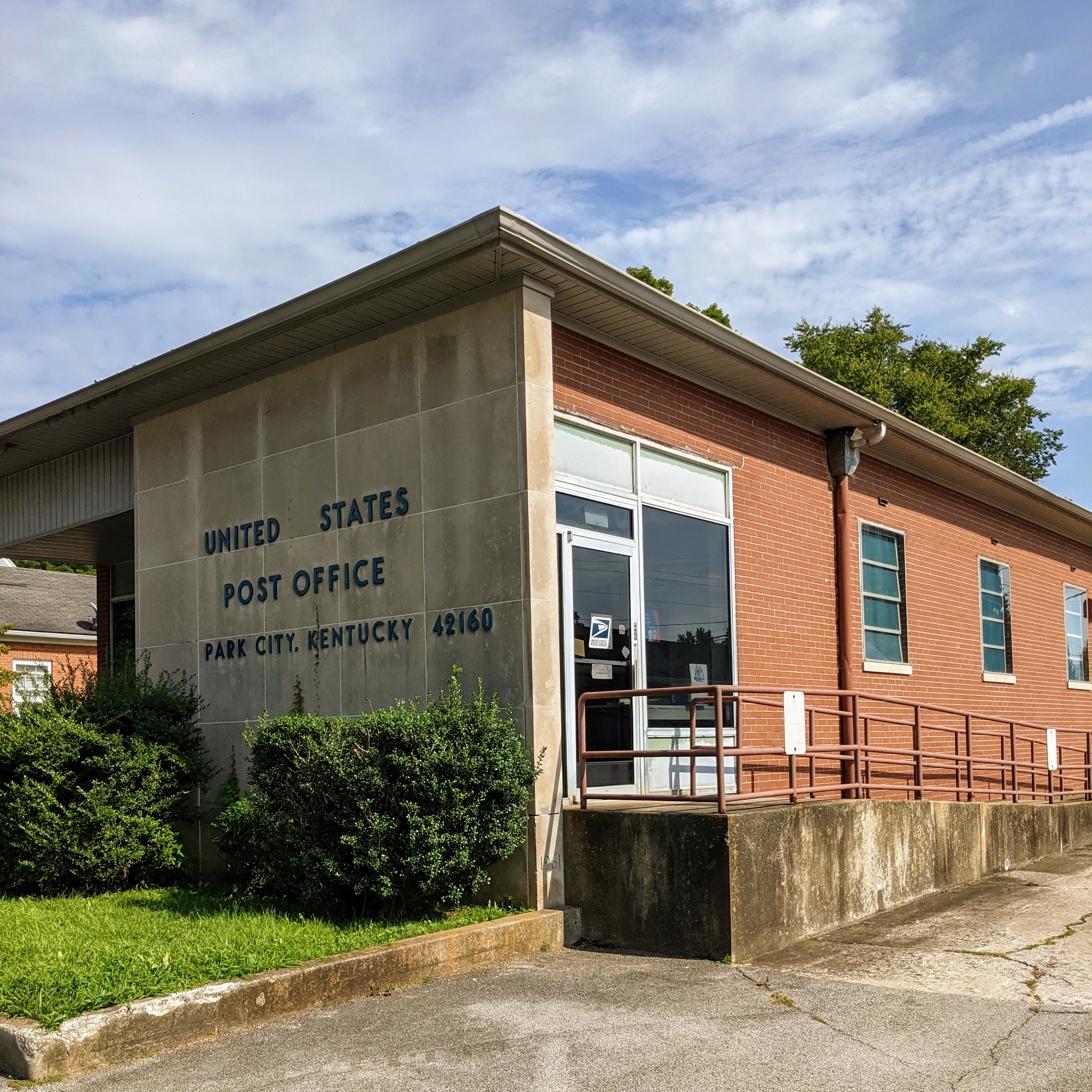
Park City Post Office

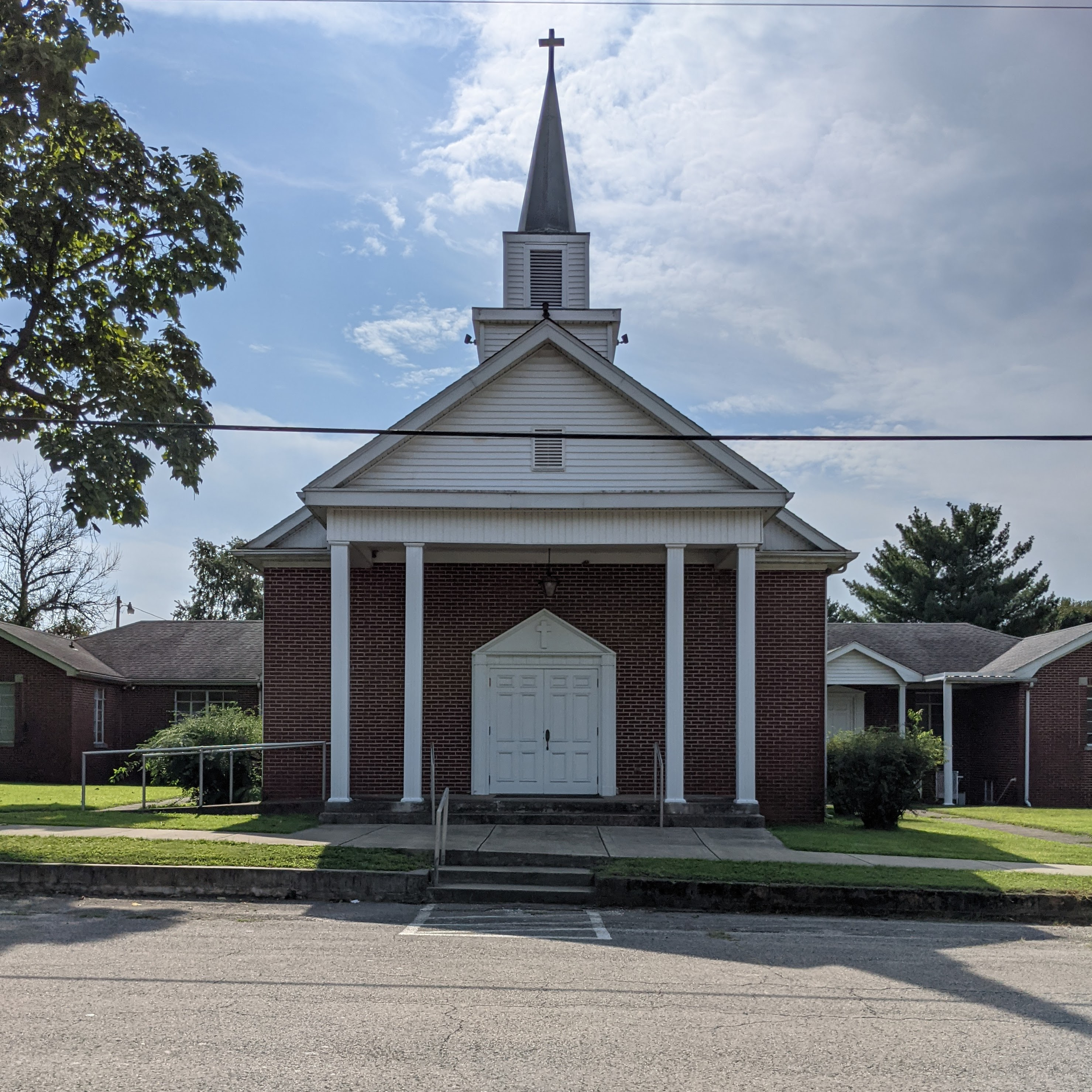
Park City Methodist church

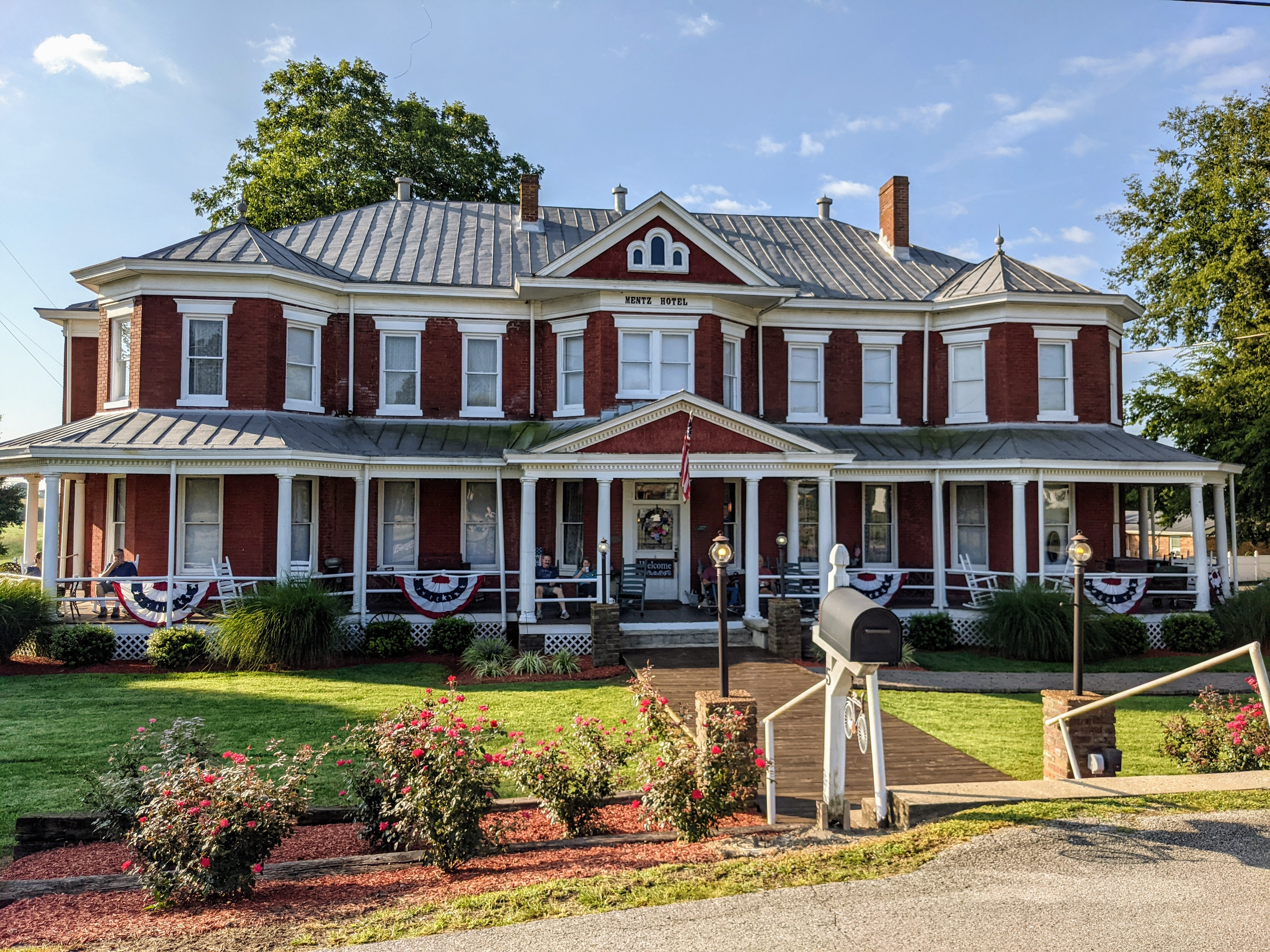
Grand Victorian Inn, Park City

== Education ==
Park City Elementary is the city's local institution, part of the Barren County Schools system. Secondary students attend Barren County Middle School (Grades 6–8), Trojan Academy (9th Grade), and Barren County High School (Grades 10–12) in Glasgow.
