= Merrimack =

Merrimack may refer to:

- Merrimack, New Hampshire, a town
- Merrimack County, New Hampshire
- Merrimack River, in Massachusetts and New Hampshire
- Merrimack Valley, the region surrounding the river
- Merrimac, California, also spelled Merrimack

== Education ==
- Merrimack College, North Andover, Massachusetts
- Merrimack High School, Merrimack, New Hampshire
- Merrimack Valley High School, Penacook, New Hampshire

== Other uses ==
- Merrimack Pharmaceuticals, a pharmaceutical company based in Massachusetts
- USS Merrimack, several ships
- Battle of the Monitor and Merrimack, 1862 battle of the American Civil War

== See also ==
- Merrimac (disambiguation)
- Meramec (disambiguation)
- Maramec
