= Merrimac =

Merrimac may refer to:

== Place names ==
- Merrimac, Queensland, Australia
  - Electoral district of Merrimac

=== United States ===
- Merrimac, California
- Merrimac, Illinois
- Merrimac, Kentucky
- Merrimac, Massachusetts, the original town with the name "Merrimac"
- Merrimac, Virginia
- Merrimac, Mingo County, West Virginia
- Merrimac (town), Wisconsin, a town
- Merrimac, Wisconsin, a village
- Merrimack River, in Massachusetts and New Hampshire, of which Merrimac is an earlier spelling

== See also ==
- Merrimac coup
- USS Merrimack, several, some spelled "Merrimac"
- Merrimack (disambiguation)
- Meramec (disambiguation)
