= Kentucky Route 289 =

Highway in Kentucky

Kentucky Route 289
- KY 289 highlighted in red

Route information
- Maintained by KYTC
- Length: 15.066 mi (24.246 km)

Major junctions
- South end: US 68 / KY 55 in Campbellsville
- North end: US 68 / KY 55 near Lebanon

Location
- Country: United States
- State: Kentucky
- Counties: Taylor, Marion

Highway system
- Kentucky State Highway System; Interstate; US; State; Parkways
← KY 288	→ KY 290

Kentucky Route 289 runs between US 68/KY 55 in Campbellsville, Kentucky in Taylor County to US 68 about 3 miles south of Lebanon, Kentucky in Marion County. It is the old route for US 68 and KY 55 going into rural communities, such as Hobson and Finley in Taylor County and Jessietown and New Market, Kentucky in Marion County. The road was designated on January 27, 1983, when US 68 was rerouted off of this road.

The route is 15.066 miles (24.246 km) long and is in some cases more expedient in going between Lebanon and Campbellsville than the scenic highway Route 68.

An earlier KY 289 was a road from Golden Pond northward to Eddyville, traversing parts of Trigg and Lyon Counties in western Kentucky. In 1964/1965, most of the road was inundated due to formation of Lake Barkley. A small portion remained north from Golden Pond but that was decommissioned the next year, and it is now Forest Road 134.

== Route description ==
KY 289 begins at an intersection with US 68/KY 55 in Campbellsville, Taylor County, heading north on two-lane undivided Lebanon Avenue. The road passes a few businesses before it enters residential areas. The route becomes Old Lebanon Road and passes through more areas of homes and businesses, where it runs to the west of a lake. KY 289 passes to the west of Taylor Regional Hospital as it continues through developed areas and crosses KY 3350. The road leaves Campbellsville and heads into farmland with some residential development, curving northwest and intersecting the eastern terminus of KY 3211. The route continues through a mix of farms and woods with some homes, turning to the north at an intersection with KY 1400. KY 289 runs through more rural areas and comes to an intersection with KY 744. At this point, the route forms a concurrency with KY 744 before KY 744 splits to the west. KY 289 curves to the northeast and reaches a junction with the northern terminus of KY 634.

At the KY 634 intersection, the road crosses into Marion County and becomes unnamed, heading into dense forests. The route makes several curves before it continues to the north. KY 289 continues into farmland with some woods and homes and forms a short concurrency with KY 412. The road turns east before curving to the northeast as it heads through more rural areas. KY 289 continues north and comes to its northern terminus at another intersection with US 68/KY 55 south of Lebanon.

== Major intersections ==
County	Location	mi	km	Destinations	Notes
Taylor	Campbellsville	0.000	0.000	US 68 / KY 55 (East Broadway)	
Taylor	Campbellsville	1.896	3.051	KY 3350 (North Bypass Road)	
Taylor		2.950	4.748	KY 3211 west (Mile Lane)	
Taylor		3.712	5.974	KY 1400 north (Owl Creek Road)	
Taylor		5.780	9.302	KY 744 east (Cave Road)	South end of KY 744 overlap
Taylor		6.110	9.833	KY 744 west (Hobson Road)	North end of KY 744 overlap
Taylor–Marion county line		9.449	15.207	KY 634 south (East Finley Ridge Road)	
Marion		11.137	17.923	KY 412 west (St. Joe Road)	South end of KY 412 overlap
Marion		11.179	17.991	KY 412 east (Jessietown Road)	North end of KY 412 overlap
Marion	Lebanon	15.066	24.246	US 68 / KY 55 (Campbellsville Road)	
1.000 mi = 1.609 km; 1.000 km = 0.621 mi
