= Cimarron-class oiler =

Cimarron-class oiler may refer to either of two classes of oilers.

- Cimarron-class oiler (1939), were built before and during World War II and served into the 1970s, in some cases until the Gulf War.
- Cimarron-class fleet replenishment oiler, a faster multi-function refueling ship with helicopter support
