= USS Willamette (AO-180) =

Oiler of the United States Navy

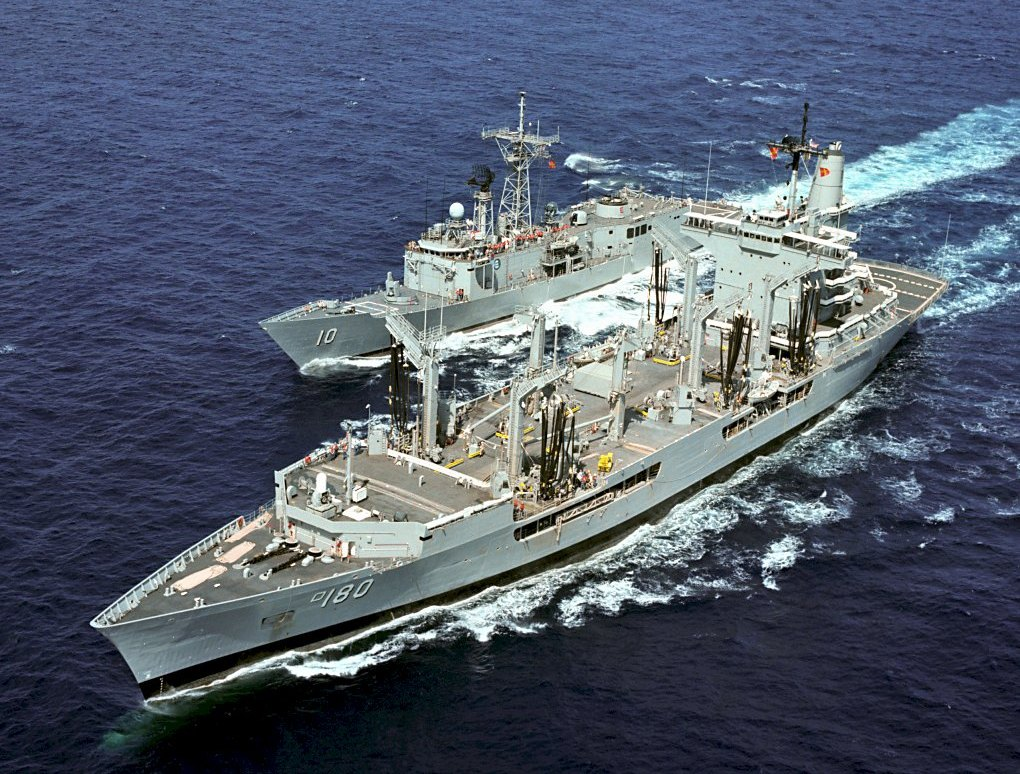
- Willamette with USS Duncan before the jumboization, 1987

History

United States
- Name: USS Willamette
- Namesake: Willamette River
- Builder: Avondale Shipyards
- Laid down: 4 August 1980
- Launched: 18 July 1981
- Commissioned: 18 December 1982
- Decommissioned: 30 April 1999
- Stricken: 30 April 1999
- Identification: IMO number: 7816563
- Fate: Scrapped 20 January 2014

General characteristics
- Class & type: Cimarron-class fleet replenishment oiler
- Displacement: 36,977 tons full load
- Length: 700 ft (210 m)
- Beam: 88 ft (27 m)
- Draft: 32 ft (9.8 m)
- Propulsion: Steam turbine
- Speed: 20 kn (37 km/h)
- Complement: 12 officers, 148 enlisted
- Armament: 2 × 25 mm guns; 2 × 20 mm Phalanx CIWS; 4 × .50-caliber Machine Guns

USS Willamette (AO-180) was the fourth ship in the Cimarron class of fleet replenishment oilers for the United States Navy in service from 1981 to 1999.

== History ==
=== Commissioning ===
The contract for Willamette was awarded on 11 April 1978 to Avondale Shipyards Inc in New Orleans. On 18 July 1981, the ship was launched in a unique sideways fashion into the Mississippi River at Avondale Shipyards, Louisiana. Admiral William J. Crowe, Jr., USN, Commander-in-Chief Allied Forces, Europe, was the principal speaker at the ceremony and his wife, Shirley Grennell Crowe, was the ship's sponsor. After completion, USS Willamette (AO-180) was commissioned at Pearl Harbor, Hawaii, the first U.S. Navy ship to be commissioned at Pearl Harbor since 1917. Willamette replaced USS Ashtabula in the Pacific Fleet. The ship's mission was to transport and deliver bulk petroleum products, and limited fleet freight, mail, and personnel to combatant and support ships underway.

Willamette was the first ship of the class to be protected by two MK 15 Phalanx Weapon Systems. Extensive damage control equipment and systems ensure rapid response to control any type of emergency.

=== Namesake ===
The ship was the first in the U.S. Navy to bear the name, and she was named after the Willamette River in Oregon. The name Willamette is of Native American origin, though there is no definitive source. The name is thought to mean "long and beautiful river" or "rain waters along the river". Originally, there was another ship named Willamette but the contract for the construction of that Willamette, a projected screw sloop-of-war of the Contoocook class, was canceled in 1866 before its keel was laid.

The ship's shield explained the capability of the ship to supply both types of fuel, for surface ships and for aircraft and was symbolized by the dolphin and eagle's wing. The arched, wavy bend was a reference to the historic Willamette River in Oregon for which the ship is named.

The ship's crest represented the flaming torch; behind the national bird symbol, the bald eagle, was a representation of the words of the ship's motto: "Fuel for Freedom".

=== Operational service ===
As the ship was built at New Orleans and commissioned at Pearl Harbor, it was necessary to transit the Panama Canal on 24 October 1982. Leaving New Orleans was delayed as the initial fuel load at Avondale had caused the ship to sink into the bottom of the river. Several tugboats were required to pull the ship out of the mud and into the river channel. A month later Willamette visited Portland, Oregon and transited to the ship's namesake, the Willamette River. While mooring at Portland, the ship hit an underwater cement pier containing a main telephone trunk. The phone cable was cut, the cement pier destroyed, and the western half of the city of Portland lost phone services for several days. In addition, the bottom of the ship sustained minor damage, which was visible from the inside of both pump rooms. While leaving the Columbia River a few days later, the handrails on the forward deck were destroyed by rough seas at the Columbia River Bar. The handrails were later replaced with steel plating.

In 1983 Willamette was involved in another incident while departing Pearl Harbor. While being turned in the channel by a tug, the tug's line broke and Willamette began to drift towards a Los Angeles-class submarine. The captain then ordered emergency back full and the ship came to a stop about a meter from the submarine. As the captain did not give the STOP order the ship began to pick up speed in reverse. The captain therefore ordered emergency ahead full, but the ship still backed into USS Cimarron tied up at a pier. Both ships were only slightly damaged. However, Willamette's crew then re-christened the ship as "Will-Ram-It".

In April 1984 the Willamette softball team played 95 consecutive hours of softball to break the previous world record of 94 hours and got into the Guinness Book of World Records. Starting on 15 January 1985 the ship deployed on her first WESTPAC (western pacific) cruise and visited Guam, Subic Bay, Hong Kong, Pusan, Korea, Sasebo, Kagoshima, Yokosuka, and Shimoda, Japan.

During a formation steaming exercise on 10 February 1986 about 100 nautical miles (190 km; 120 mi) southwest Pearl Harbor, Hawaii, Willamette collided with the repair ship USS Jason. As a result of the collision, one of the crew on Jason was killed and eight injured. Willamette was at the center of the steaming formation and was the "guide ship" that the rest of the ships in the formation were using to maintain their relative position in the formation. Jason was instructed to take station in the center rear of the formation. Jason was approaching the formation from the southeast, and for some reason mistakenly decided to cut through the steaming formation as opposed to going around it and approaching her station from the rear. Reportedly several ships in the formation maneuvered to avoid a collision. The reaction on Willamette was too slow, and she pierced Jason approximately 1/3 of the ship length from the bow, and the resulting momentum nearly broke Jason in half. The time was shortly before 10 pm local. Ironically, on Willamette the bridge was equipped with an early version of a then new anti-collision radar system. The collision alarm was sounded about 30 seconds prior to the actual collision, but most of the off crew was near the rear of the ship and barely felt the shudder of the impact. On the bridge of Willamette as the ship withdrew after the engines were applied full astern, the view of a triangle-shaped void from the weather deck to below the water line where the bow had pierced Jason's hull was unforgettable. This void was filled with the bright stark white fluorescent lights from multiple decks on Jason amid the darkness of the night and the smoke and flames on the bow of Willamette. The next day clothing and shoes belonging to the sailors on Jason were found on Willamette's bow. The collision smashed Willamette's bow from the rail to below the waterline. Willamette returned to port under her own power. A large vertical rupture from the deck to waterline on the port side of Jason forced that ship to be towed back to port by USS Brunswick. The resultant fires in Willamette's boatswain's locker took several hours to extinguish. The smoke was so thick that the crew could not enter the flaming compartment via the hatch. Therefore, holes were cut in the deck above so that nozzles could be inserted to extinguish the blaze. Both ships had to be emptied of fuel and needed to be repaired for several months. Willamette received a new bow section, and while in drydock hull damage sustained during the grounding in the Willamette River was also repaired. As a result of the collision both captains were relieved of command, and the ship earned the nickname "We'll Ram It."

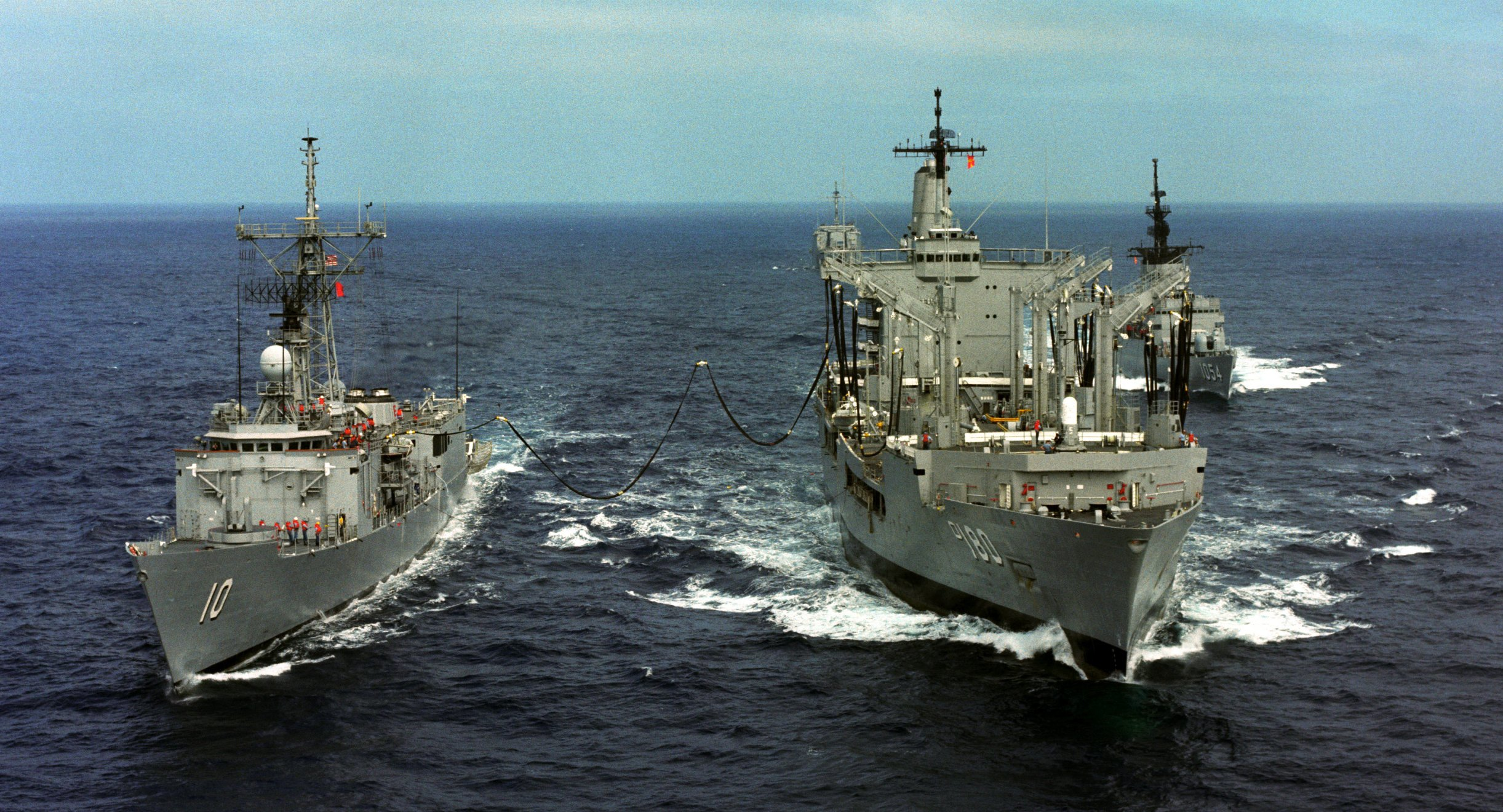
Willamette refuels Duncan, Gray follows behind.

In 1987 Willamette undertook a global circumnavigation and operated under all four numbered fleet commanders. She left her Hawaiian home waters on 14 January 1987 and crossed the International dateline headed west on 15 January. At midnight on 16 January the clocks were advanced 24 hours to midnight on the 17th, thereby skipping 16 January 1987 completely. Reportedly one of the crew officially skipped his birthday that day. After a brief three-day stop in Subic Bay, the ship left port again and steamed at a flank bell all the way to the Singapore Straights before slowing down. During this portion of the world cruise, the ship was attached to Battle Group Bravo and USS Kitty Hawk. After loitering at times off the coast of Oman, the ship proceeded independently south to Mombasa, Kenya. The ship crossed the equator for the first time on 6 April 1987. After visiting Mombasa, the ship sailed directly Seychelles Island group while the rest of Battle Group Bravo made a port-of-call in India. After departing the Seychelles the ship sailed to Diego Garcia to take on fuel and supplies and then rejoined Battle Group Bravo and proceeded up the Red Sea to the southern entrance of the Suez Canal. While the Battle Group was in the middle of transiting the Suez Canal, USS Stark was hit and heavily damaged by an Exocet missile fired by an Iraqi fighter. After clearing the Suez Canal, for a period of about 24 hours, Battle Group Bravo steamed in a holding pattern in the Mediterranean Sea awaiting instructions. The Battle Group proceeded to the French Riviera while Willamette diverted independently for a brief stop in Italy. Most of Battle Group Bravo went on to various ports of call inside and outside the Mediterranean while Willamette proceed to Naval Station Rota, Spain for a port call. After leaving Rota the ship rejoined Battle Group Bravo for a brief period while crossing the Atlantic Ocean. Willamette detached from Battle Group Bravo mid-Atlantic Ocean and proceeded on to San Juan, Puerto Rico and then on to stop in St. Thomas, US Virgin Islands. Upon leaving the Virgin Islands she steamed for the Panama Canal and transit. After clearing the Pacific side of the Panama Canal she escorted the ships returning to San Diego up the Pacific side Central America before detaching and returning to Hawaiian waters. She arrived back at Pearl Harbor about 29 June 1987. <verification needed for date>

On 17 April 1989, the first female sailors embarked on the ship.

=== Jumboization ===
To increase the fueled load of the Cimarron-class oilers it was decided in the late 1980s to lengthen the ships. Willamette became the second ship complete the so-called "jumboization" on 27 September 1991. A 108-foot (33 m) mid-body section was added to the center of the ship. This mid-body increased fuel capacity by 30,000 barrels and added an ordnance cargo capability of 625 tons. The mid-body also featured an additional emergency diesel generator and two "Standard Tensioned Replenishment Alongside Method" (STREAM) cargo stations. Ballast and cargo transfer systems were fully automated and designed to effect safe and efficient transfer of bulk petroleum cargo. The new length of the ship was 216.0 m (708 ft 8 in).

=== Boiler explosion ===
On 29 June 1995, while moored at Pearl Harbor, seven crewmen were slightly injured from smoke inhalation during a boiler explosion and the resulting self-extinguished fire-ball in the boiler room while being moored. After condoning the actions causing the explosion, Chief Engineer Lieutenant Brian Tansey oversaw the crew as they quickly responded to the explosion with help from base firefighters, the Honolulu Fire Department, and members from a Japanese Maritime Self Defense Force ship moored nearby. Damage included bowed boiler casings, sprung steam pipes and major cracks in the exhaust stack and economizer.

On 4 June 1998 Willamette made the final port visit to Portland and transit of her namesake river. Half a year later USNS John Ericsson, the replacement ship for Willamette arrived in Pearl Harbor. Willamette conducted the final underway replenishment with USS Chosin and USS Lake Erie on 12 February 1999.

Her 17-year career took her around the world where she performed underway replenishment (UNREP) and operations under all four (Second, Third, Sixth and Seventh) fleet commanders. During her time in service, she performed more than 1,300 underway replenishments, transferred more than 300 million gallons of fuel and has operated with the navies of Australia, Canada, France, England, Japan, Pakistan, South Korea, Thailand and Venezuela. Awarded the Navy "E" Ribbon, National Defense Service Medal, and Armed Forces Expeditionary Medal.

=== Decommissioning ===
On 30 April 1999 the ship was decommissioned at Pearl Harbor. Willamette was the last U.S. Navy manned auxiliary oiler assigned to U.S. Pacific Fleet and was the last steam-propelled warship home ported in Pearl Harbor. On 10 June 1999 the ship was towed out of Pearl Harbor en route to the mothball fleet at Suisun Bay, Benicia, California (USA). Two years later, on 28 July 2001 Willamette was disposed of by Navy title transfer to the Maritime Administration to be part of the Naval Defense Reserve Fleet. She was scrapped at Brownsville on 20 January 2014.

=== Awards ===
- Navy Meritorious Unit Commendation - (Jan-May 1987)
- Navy Unit Commendation - (Dec 1995-May 1996)
- Navy E Ribbon - (1986, 1987, 1988, 1991, 1994, 1996)
- Navy Expeditionary Medal - (Feb-Jul 1987)
- National Defense Service Medal
- Armed Forces Expeditionary Medal
- Sea Service Ribbon
