= Finley, Kentucky =

Unincorporated community in Kentucky, United States

Finley (org. Crooked Sourwood)
- Unincorporated community
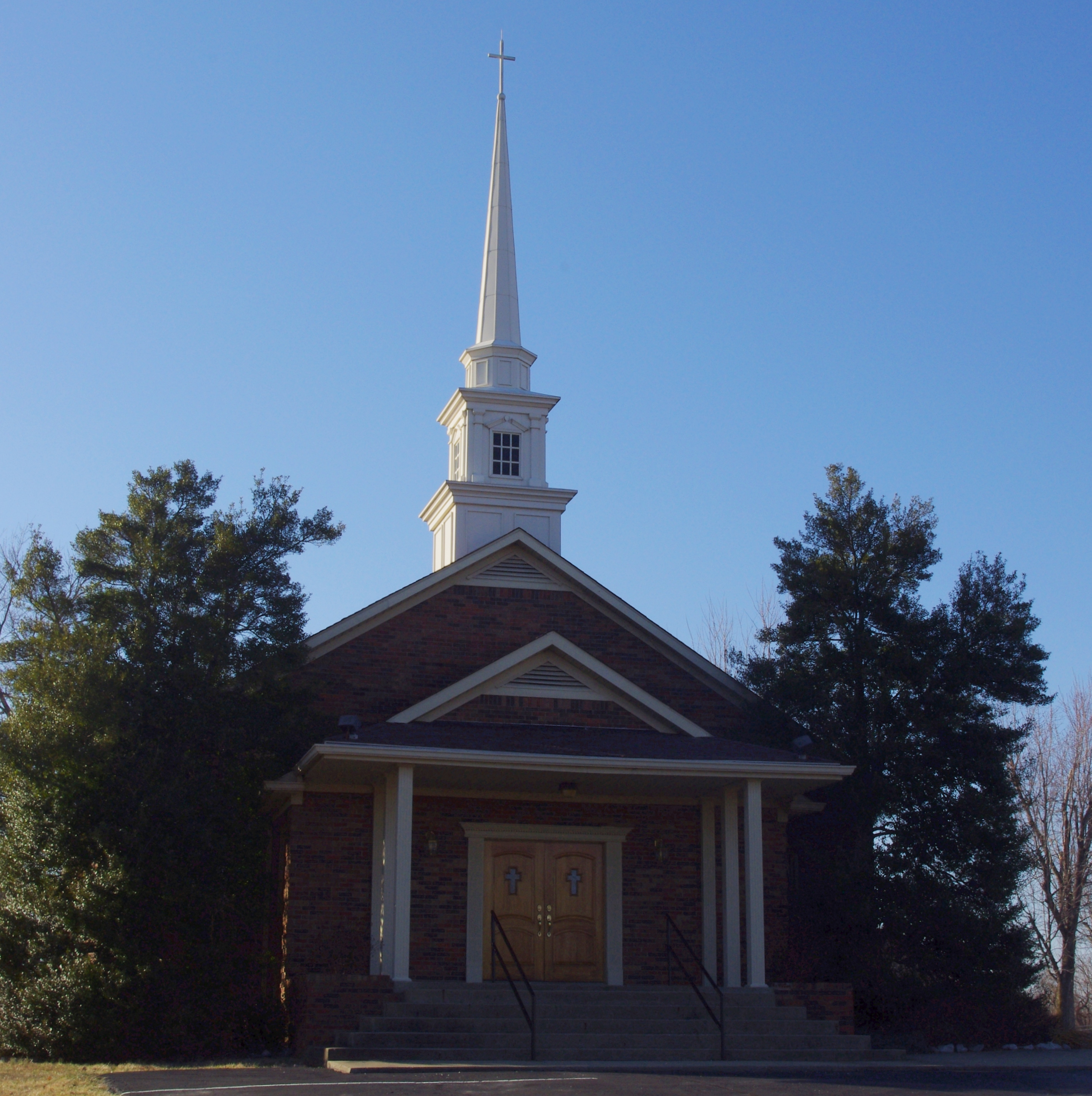
- Our Lady of the Hills Church is on Old Lebanon Road

- Location within the state of Kentucky Finley (org. Crooked Sourwood) (the United States)
- Coordinates: 37°27′41″N 85°20′22″W
- Country: United States
- State: Kentucky
- County: Taylor
- Elevation: 1,017 ft (310 m)
- Time zone: UTC-5 (Eastern (EST))
  - Summer (DST): UTC-4 (EDT)
- GNIS feature ID: 492082

Finley is an unincorporated community in Taylor County, Kentucky, United States. It lies along Kentucky Route 289 and KY 634 north of the city of Campbellsville, the seat of Taylor County. Its elevation is 1,017 feet (310 m).
