= Merrimack Pharmaceuticals =

Company in Cambridge, United States

Merrimack Pharmaceuticals, Inc.
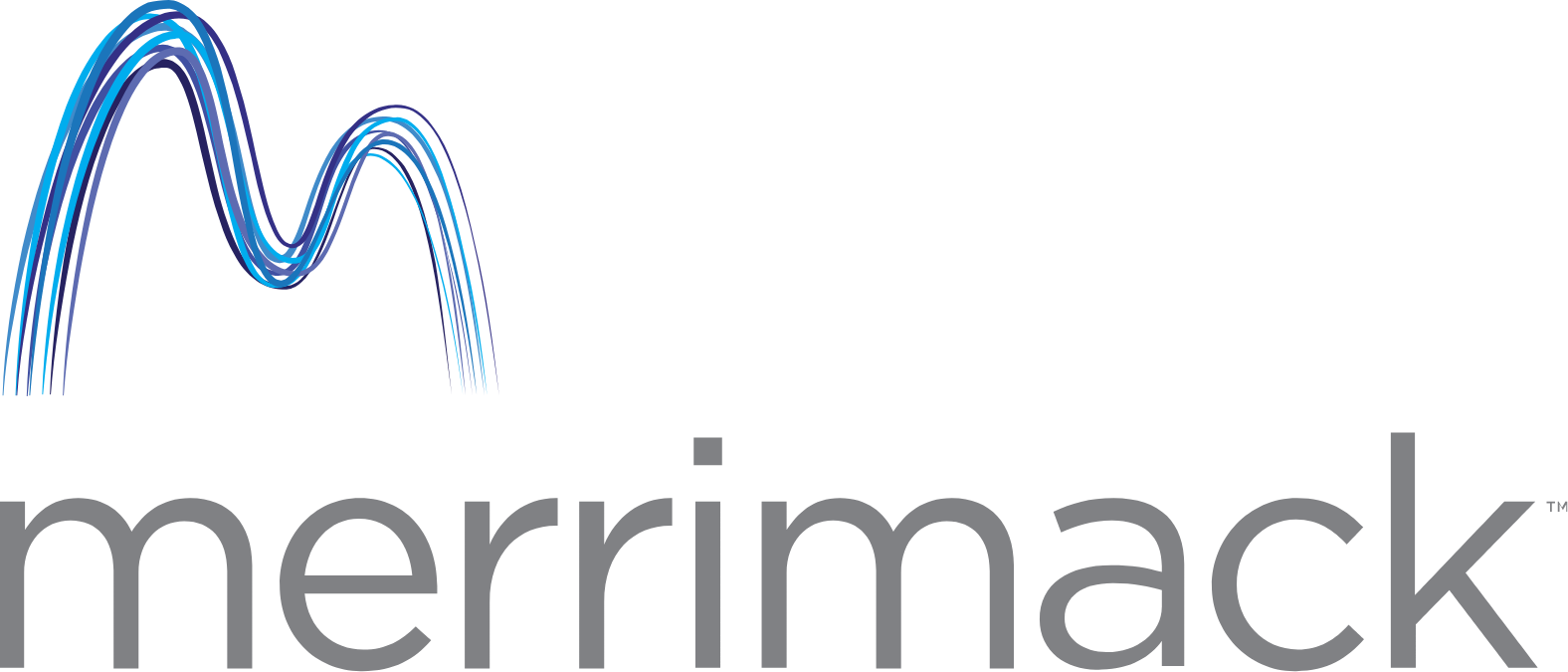
- Company type: Public
- Traded as: Nasdaq: MACK; Russell Microcap Index component
- Industry: Pharmaceuticals
- Founded: 2000; 26 years ago in Cambridge, Massachusetts
- Headquarters: Cambridge, Massachusetts, United States
- Number of employees: 426 (2016)
- Website: merrimack.com

Merrimack Pharmaceuticals, Inc. is a pharmaceutical company based in Cambridge, Massachusetts, United States. They specialize in developing drugs for the treatment of cancer.

Merrimack's first FDA-approved drug was approved in 2015; Onivyde, a liposome encapsulated version of irinotecan is used for treating pancreatic adenocarcinoma. It was approved for use in the European Union the following year.

== History ==
Merrimack was founded by a group of scientists from MIT and Harvard University in 2000.

In 2016, Merrimack had 426 full-time employees, 103 of which had an MD or PhD.

In October 2016, CEO Robert Mulroy resigned and the company announced they would be laying off 20% of its employees. In January 2017, interim CEO Gary Crocker resigned and the board of directors appointed Richard Peters to be president and CEO. Peters previously worked at Sanofi and was a faculty member at Harvard University.

In January 2017, French pharmaceutical company Ipsen announced they would be purchasing Onivyde from Merrimack for approximately $1 billion. Following the close of the deal with Ipsen, Merrimack reduced its headcount by about 80%. By May of 2019, Merrimack planned to lay off its entire staff, including the leadership team.

On November 13, 2018, the statistical programming director Songjiang Wang, received "six months in prison and one year supervised released" after a guilty verdict was handed down to Wang from a United States District Judge in July 2018 for securities fraud and conspiracy to commit securities fraud. Also on December 20, 2019, the United States Securities and Exchange Commission charged Wang with Insider trading.

On May 10, 2024, Merrimack announced that the stockholders at a Special Meeting held that day approved the adoption of a Plan of Dissolution. The Board of Directors declared a liquidating cash dividend in the amount of $15.10 per share, expected to be paid on or about May 17, 2024. Merrimack’s Common Stock would continue to trade on NASDAQ through May 17, 2024 and thereafter delist from NASDAQ on May 20, 2024.

== Pipeline ==
Merrimack has four drugs in clinical development.

- MM-302 – HER2 targeting antibody-drug conjugate
- MM-121 (seribantumab) – anti-HER3 monoclonal antibody
- MM-141 (istiratumab) – IGF-1R and HER3 bispecific monoclonal antibody
- MM-151 – anti-EGFR mixture of monoclonal antibody
