= Istiratumab =

Monoclonal antibody

Monoclonal antibody
- Type: ?
- Source: Human
- Target: IGF1R, ErbB3

Clinical data
- Other names: MM-141
- ATC code: none

Identifiers
- CAS Number: 1509928-04-4
- ChemSpider: none
- UNII: XLR461MD3M
- KEGG: D10943

Chemical and physical data
- Formula: C_{8802}H_{13532}N_{2392}O_{2796}S_{58}
- Molar mass: 199458.51 g·mol^{−1}

Istiratumab (MM-141) is an experimental monoclonal antibody for the treatment of cancer. It is a bispecific antibody targeting IGF-1R and ErbB3.

It is in development by Merrimack Pharmaceuticals (In the US) and was awarded orphan drug status for pancreatic cancer.
