= Black Gnat, Kentucky =

Unincorporated community in Kentucky, United States

- Unincorporated community
- Location within Kentucky Location within the United States
- Coordinates: 37°18′15″N 85°26′11″W
- Country: United States
- State: Kentucky
- County: Green and Taylor
- Elevation: 846 ft (258 m)
- Time zones: UTC-6 (Central (CST))
  - Summer (DST): UTC-5 (CDT)
- UTC-5 (Eastern (EST))
  - Summer (DST): UTC-4 (EDT)
- GNIS feature ID: 507513

Black Gnat is an unincorporated community in Green and Taylor Counties in the U.S. state of Kentucky. It lies along Old U.S. Route 68 between the cities of Campbellsville and Greensburg, the county seats of Taylor and Green Counties. Its elevation is 846 feet (258 m).

The community's name originates from a pioneer incident. After the local schoolhouse was painted, it became covered in black gnats. A person remarked about the large number of the black gnats, and the name remained. Black Gnat has been noted for its unusual place name.
