= Bengal, Kentucky =

Unincorporated community in Kentucky, United States

Bengal
- Unincorporated community
- Location within the state of Kentucky Bengal (the United States)
- Coordinates: 37°21′33″N 85°27′26″W
- Country: United States
- State: Kentucky
- County: Taylor
- Elevation: 722 ft (220 m)
- Time zone: UTC-5 (Eastern (EST))
  - Summer (DST): UTC-4 (EDT)
- GNIS feature ID: 507494

Bengal is an unincorporated community in Taylor County, Kentucky, United States. Located west of the city of Campbellsville, the county seat of Taylor County, it is served by Bengal Road from Campbellsville and by Route 323. Its elevation is 722 feet (220 m).

== Name origin ==
It may have been named after an early street in Shippingport, Kentucky, now an area included within the city of Louisville. Another possibility is that it was associated with a French settler from Calcutta via Bengal, who first settled in Paris, Kentucky.

== History ==
The first settlers of Campbellsville and this part of the county arrived after the American Revolutionary War. Many migrants used the Cumberland Gap to travel through the Appalachians. About 1802 Elias Barbee and Revolutionary War veterans James and Jonathan Cowherd established a school in the Bengal area, as churches were also being founded. Barbee served as a general during the War of 1812. He and numerous other migrants to what became Taylor County were from Pennsylvania; while others were from Virginia, North Carolina, and Maryland.

In 1911 the community was provided service by the Bengal Telephone Company.
