= Acton, Kentucky =

Unincorporated community in Kentucky, United States

Acton
- Unincorporated community
- Location within the state of Kentucky Acton (the United States)
- Coordinates: 37°20′49″N 85°14′53″W
- Country: United States
- State: Kentucky
- County: Taylor
- Elevation: 728 ft (222 m)
- Time zone: UTC-5 (Eastern (EST))
  - Summer (DST): UTC-4 (EDT)
- GNIS feature ID: 507371

Acton is an unincorporated community in Taylor County, Kentucky, United States. It lies along Route 70 east of the city of Campbellsville, the county seat of Taylor County. Its elevation is 728 feet (222 m).
