= Meramec =

Meramec is a name for several places in the United States:

- Meramec River in Missouri
- Meramec Caverns on the Meramec River
- Meramec State Park in Missouri

== See also ==
- Merrimac (disambiguation)
- Merrimack (disambiguation)
- Meramec (series)
- Meramec Township (disambiguation)
