= USS Monongahela (AO-178) =

Oiler of the United States Navy

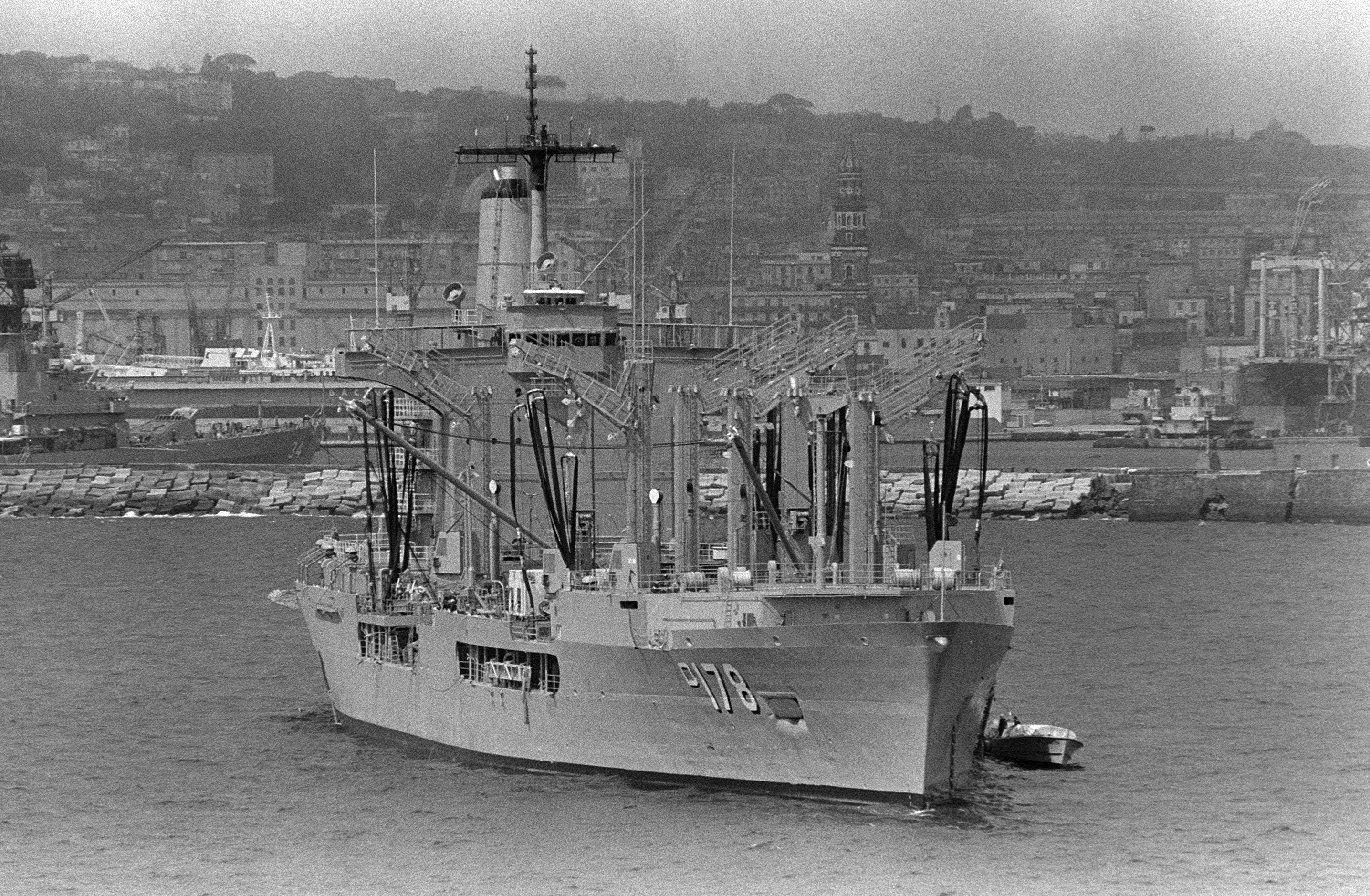
- Monongahela in Italy, 1986

History

United States
- Name: USS Monongahela (AO-178)
- Namesake: Monongahela River
- Builder: Avondale Shipyards
- Laid down: 15 August 1978
- Launched: 4 August 1979
- Commissioned: 5 September 1981
- Decommissioned: 30 September 1999
- Stricken: 30 September 1999
- Identification: IMO number: 7638545
- Fate: Scrapped 31 March 2016

General characteristics
- Class & type: Cimarron class fleet oiler
- Displacement: 36,977 tons full load
- Length: 708 ft (216 m)
- Beam: 88 ft (27 m)
- Draft: 32 ft (9.8 m)
- Propulsion: two boilers, one steam turbine, single shaft, 24,000shp
- Speed: 20 kn (37 km/h)
- Capacity: 150,000 barrels of fuel oil or aviation fuel and several tons of additional goods
- Complement: 12 officers, 148 enlisted
- Sensors & processing systems: A/N SPS-55 Surface Search Radar
- Electronic warfare & decoys: SLQ-25 Nixie Torpedo Counter Measure
- Armament: 4 x M2HB heavy machine guns
- Aircraft carried: None, but fitted with stern helicopter landing platform

USS Monongahela (AO-178) was a Cimarron-class fleet replenishment oiler commissioned in the United States Navy from 1981 to 1999.

== Operational history ==
Monongahela was laid down on 15 August 1978, at Avondale Shipyards, New Orleans, Louisiana and launched, 4 August 1979. Ships of this class were built with a mast that folded at the AN/SPS-55 pedestal platform to allow the passage under the Huey P. Long Bridge. She was commissioned on 5 September 1981.

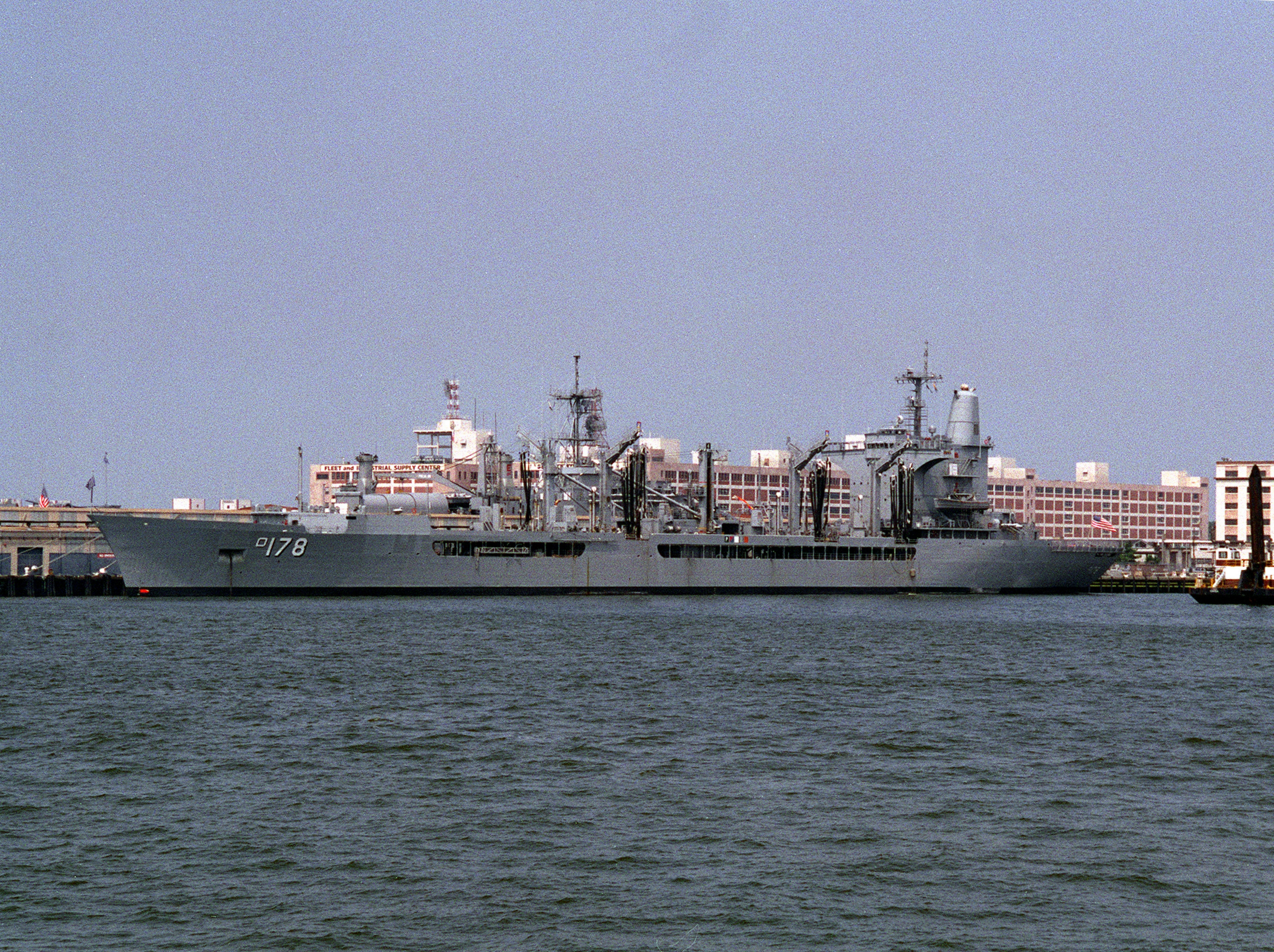
Monongahela after her "jumboization" in 1993.

Monongahela was the second ship of the Cimarron class oilers and the third ship in the Navy to bear the name. During her service life the ship has traveled to many parts of the world, including: The Mediterranean Sea, the Indian Ocean, the North Atlantic, the Pacific Ocean and the Caribbean Sea.

In December 1991, she completed an eleven-month "jumboization" at Avondale Shipyards and returned to the fleet as a greatly improved fleet oiler capable of delivering not only fuel, but also ammunition and supplies.

The Monongahela was decommissioned and stricken from the Navy list on 30 September 1999, and berthed at the James River Reserve Fleet, Fort Eustis, Virginia, awaiting final disposal. Her classification was changed on 24 May 2005 as a possible candidate for Foreign Military Sales to Chile. She was sold to Southern Recycling and scrapped in Amelia, Louisiana on 31 March 2016.

== Awards ==
- Joint Meritorious Unit Commendation
- Navy Unit Commendation
- Navy Meritorious Unit Commendation - x2
- Navy E Ribbon - x3
- Navy Expeditionary Medal - x2
- Armed Forces Expeditionary Medal
- Armed Forces Service Medal
- Coast Guard Special Operations Service Ribbon
