= Taylor County, Kentucky =

County in Kentucky, United States

- County
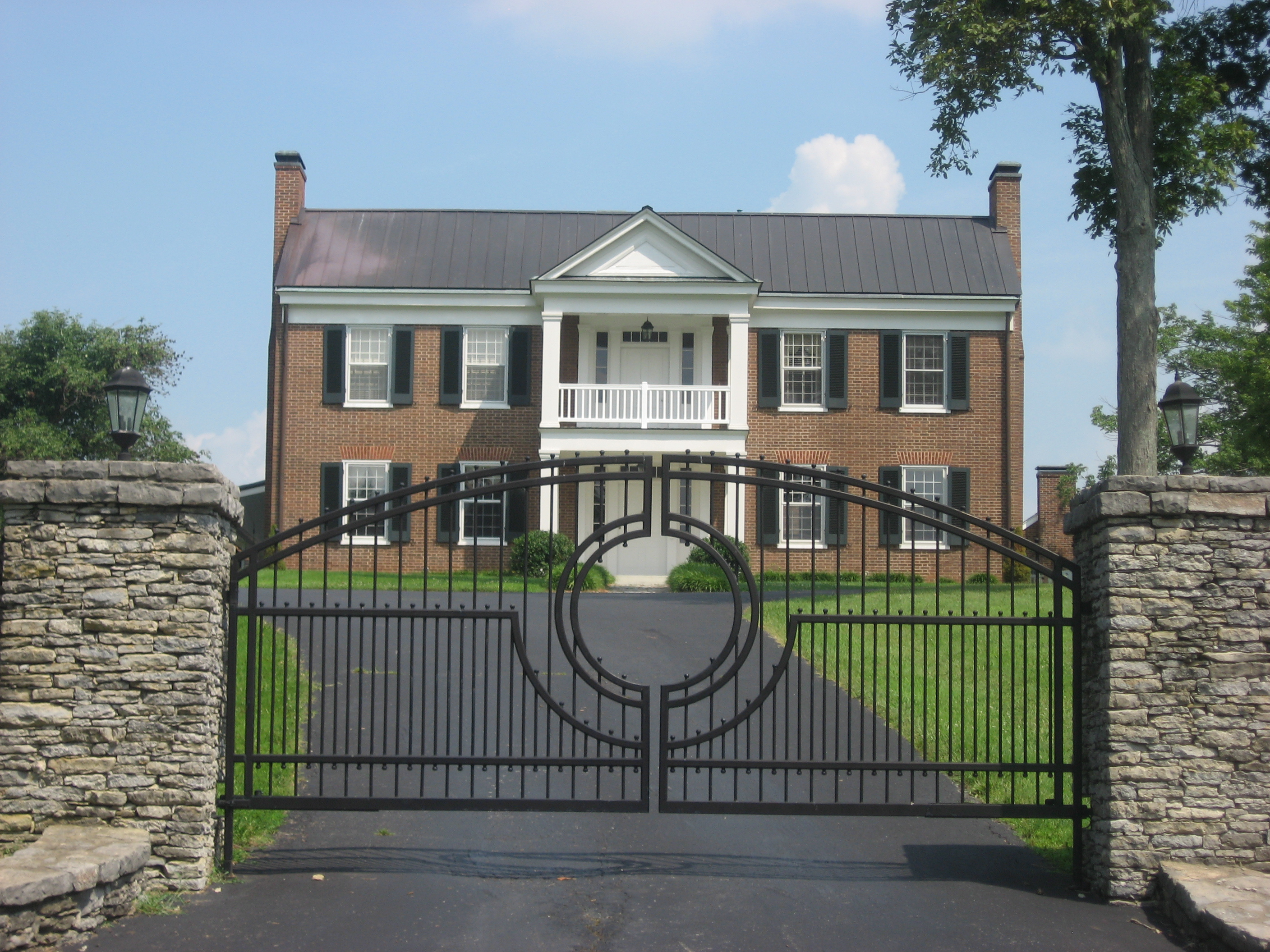
- Entrance to Clay Hill, located along Kentucky Route 289.

- Location within the U.S. state of Kentucky
- Coordinates: 37°22′N 85°20′W
- Country: United States
- State: Kentucky
- Founded: 1848
- Named for: Zachary Taylor
- Seat: Campbellsville
- Largest city: Campbellsville

Government
  - Judge/Executive: Barry Smith (R)

Area
  - Total: 277 sq mi (720 km^{2})
  - Land: 266 sq mi (690 km^{2})
  - Water: 10 sq mi (26 km^{2}) 3.8%

Population (2020)
  - Total: 26,023
  - Estimate (2025): 26,763 ▲
  - Density: 97.8/sq mi (37.8/km^{2})
- Time zone: UTC−5 (Eastern)
  - Summer (DST): UTC−4 (EDT)
- Congressional district: 1st
- Website: taylorcountyky.gov

Taylor County is a county located in the U.S. state of Kentucky. As of the 2020 census, the population was 26,023. Its county seat is Campbellsville. Settled by people from Virginia, Pennsylvania, Maryland, and North Carolina after the American Revolutionary War, the county was organized in 1848 in the Highland Rim region. It is named for United States Army General Zachary Taylor, later President of the United States. Taylor County was the 100th of the 120 counties created by Kentucky. The Campbellsville Micropolitan Statistical Area includes all of Taylor County.

== Geography ==
According to the United States Census Bureau, the county has a total area of 277 square miles (720 km^{2}), of which 266 square miles (690 km^{2}) is land and 10 square miles (26 km^{2}) (3.8%) is water.

Taylor County has a geographic boundary shaped like a heart, and also claims to be the geographic center of Kentucky. It includes a fabled center marker of Kentucky, a U.S. Coast and Geodetic Survey magnetic station marker placed in Taylor County circa 1916 which in time since has been regarded by citizens as the geodetic center of the state. Information on this marker is currently not available in federal databases. The claim to the geographic center of Kentucky is disputed by surrounding counties in part due to the planar methods used to initially determine the geographic centers of the states.

The American Civil War skirmish, The Battle of Tebbs Bend, was fought in Taylor County.

=== Adjacent counties ===
- Marion County (north)
- Casey County (east)
- Adair County (southeast/CST Border)
- Green County (south & west/CST Border)
- LaRue County (northwest)

== Demographics ==
Historical population
Census	Pop.	Note	%±
1850	7,251		—
1860	7,481		3.2%
1870	8,226		10.0%
1880	9,259		12.6%
1890	9,353		1.0%
1900	11,075		18.4%
1910	11,961		8.0%
1920	12,236		2.3%
1930	12,047		−1.5%
1940	13,556		12.5%
1950	14,403		6.2%
1960	16,285		13.1%
1970	17,138		5.2%
1980	21,178		23.6%
1990	21,146		−0.2%
2000	22,927		8.4%
2010	24,512		6.9%
2020	26,023		6.2%
2025 (est.)	26,763	▲	2.8%
U.S. Decennial Census; 1790-1960 1900-1990; 1990-2000 2010-2020

=== 2020 census ===
As of the 2020 census, the county had a population of 26,023. The median age was 38.9 years. 22.3% of residents were under the age of 18 and 18.9% of residents were 65 years of age or older. For every 100 females there were 94.9 males, and for every 100 females age 18 and over there were 92.4 males age 18 and over.

The racial makeup of the county was 88.1% White, 4.8% Black or African American, 0.1% American Indian and Alaska Native, 0.9% Asian, 0.0% Native Hawaiian and Pacific Islander, 1.5% from some other race, and 4.5% from two or more races. Hispanic or Latino residents of any race comprised 2.8% of the population.

49.1% of residents lived in urban areas, while 50.9% lived in rural areas.

There were 10,171 households in the county, of which 30.0% had children under the age of 18 living with them and 28.5% had a female householder with no spouse or partner present. About 28.9% of all households were made up of individuals and 13.4% had someone living alone who was 65 years of age or older.

There were 11,199 housing units, of which 9.2% were vacant. Among occupied housing units, 64.1% were owner-occupied and 35.9% were renter-occupied. The homeowner vacancy rate was 1.6% and the rental vacancy rate was 5.8%.

=== 2000 census ===
As of the census of 2000, there were 22,927 people, 9,233 households, and 6,555 families residing in the county. The population density was 85 per square mile (33/km^{2}). There were 10,180 housing units at an average density of 38 per square mile (15/km^{2}). The racial makeup of the county was 93.62% White, 5.06% Black or African American, 0.10% Native American, 0.18% Asian, 0.02% Pacific Islander, 0.32% from other races, and 0.70% from two or more races. 0.82% of the population were Hispanic or Latino of any race.

There were 9,233 households, out of which 30.90% had children under the age of 18 living with them, 56.40% were married couples living together, 11.50% had a female householder with no husband present, and 29.00% were non-families. 26.00% of all households were made up of individuals, and 12.20% had someone living alone who was 65 years of age or older. The average household size was 2.41 and the average family size was 2.89.

In the county, the population was spread out, with 23.40% under the age of 18, 10.40% from 18 to 24, 26.90% from 25 to 44, 24.10% from 45 to 64, and 15.20% who were 65 years of age or older. The median age was 38 years. For every 100 females, there were 92.70 males. For every 100 females age 18 and over, there were 88.70 males.

The median income for a household in the county was $28,089, and the median income for a family was $33,854. Males had a median income of $26,633 versus $20,480 for females. The per capita income for the county was $15,162. About 14.20% of families and 17.50% of the population were below the poverty line, including 23.70% of those under age 18 and 18.30% of those age 65 or over.

== Communities ==
=== City ===
- Campbellsville (county seat)

=== Unincorporated communities ===
- Acton
- Bengal
- Black Gnat (partly in Green County in the Central Time Zone)
- Elk Horn
- Finley
- Hatcher
- Hobson
- Mannsville
- Merrimac
- Saloma
- Spurlington
- Sweenyville
- Yuma

== Politics ==
United States presidential election results for Taylor County, Kentucky
Year	Republican		Democratic		Third party(ies)	
Year	No.	%	No.	%	No.	%
1912	468	18.86%	1,150	46.35%	863	34.78%
1916	1,332	49.04%	1,360	50.07%	24	0.88%
1920	2,493	50.90%	2,380	48.59%	25	0.51%
1924	2,267	52.09%	2,052	47.15%	33	0.76%
1928	3,149	65.05%	1,684	34.79%	8	0.17%
1932	2,592	47.52%	2,823	51.76%	39	0.72%
1936	2,738	49.87%	2,732	49.76%	20	0.36%
1940	2,792	49.80%	2,790	49.77%	24	0.43%
1944	2,622	51.05%	2,475	48.19%	39	0.76%
1948	2,087	44.79%	2,415	51.82%	158	3.39%
1952	3,126	55.90%	2,439	43.62%	27	0.48%
1956	3,892	61.37%	2,433	38.36%	17	0.27%
1960	4,669	68.11%	2,186	31.89%	0	0.00%
1964	2,594	45.44%	3,082	53.98%	33	0.58%
1968	3,032	50.88%	1,367	22.94%	1,560	26.18%
1972	4,035	67.79%	1,859	31.23%	58	0.97%
1976	3,337	48.60%	3,456	50.33%	73	1.06%
1980	4,243	54.62%	3,400	43.77%	125	1.61%
1984	5,932	64.16%	3,286	35.54%	27	0.29%
1988	5,362	64.76%	2,879	34.77%	39	0.47%
1992	4,319	48.42%	3,518	39.44%	1,083	12.14%
1996	4,573	54.87%	2,897	34.76%	865	10.38%
2000	6,151	67.96%	2,790	30.83%	110	1.22%
2004	7,247	70.39%	2,979	28.94%	69	0.67%
2008	7,568	69.69%	3,165	29.14%	127	1.17%
2012	7,551	68.96%	3,285	30.00%	114	1.04%
2016	8,320	73.59%	2,553	22.58%	433	3.83%
2020	9,376	74.91%	2,963	23.67%	178	1.42%
2024	9,523	77.67%	2,576	21.01%	162	1.32%

=== Elected officials ===
Elected officials as of January 3, 2025
U.S. House	James Comer (R)	KY 1
Ky. Senate	Max Wise (R)	16
Ky. House	Michael Sarge Pollock (R)	51

== Education ==
School districts include:

- Campbellsville Independent School District
- Taylor County School District

== See also ==
- National Register of Historic Places listings in Taylor County, Kentucky
