= Meramec Township =

Meramec Township is the name of six townships in the U.S. state of Missouri:

- Meramec Township, Crawford County, Missouri
- Meramec Township, Dent County, Missouri
- Meramec Township, Franklin County, Missouri
- Meramec Township, Jefferson County, Missouri
- Meramec Township, Phelps County, Missouri
- Meramec Township, St. Louis County, Missouri

== See also ==
- Meramec (disambiguation)
