= New Market, Kentucky =

Unincorporated community in Kentucky, United States

Coordinates: 37°30′06″N 85°18′39″W

New Market is an unincorporated community in Marion County, Kentucky, in the United States.

== History ==
A post office was established at New Market in 1820, and remained in operation until it was discontinued in 1906. In 1877, New Market contained two stores and one church.
