= Cimarron-class fleet replenishment oiler =

1979 class of US Navy replenishment oilers

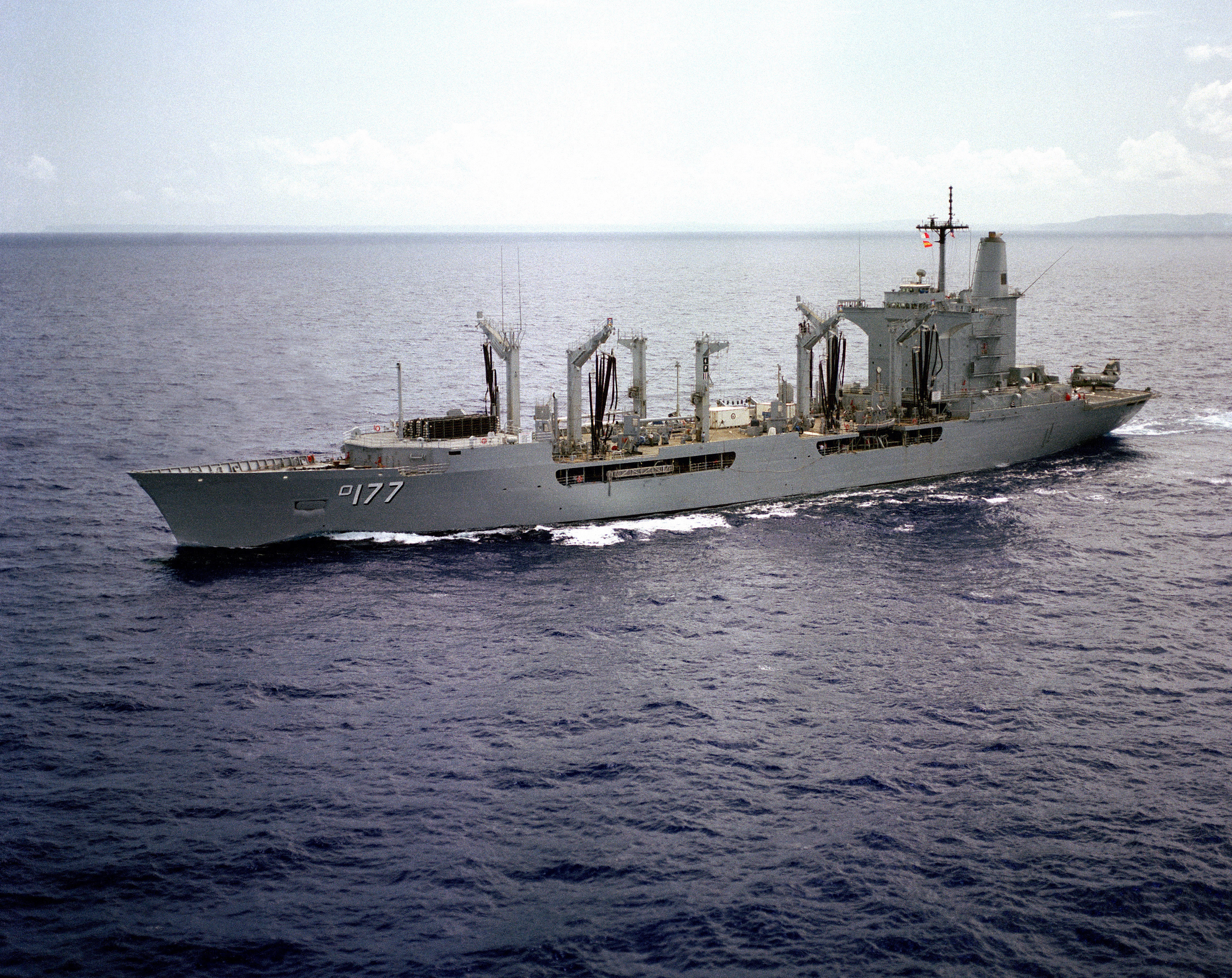
- USS Cimarron

Class overview
- Name: Cimarron class
- Builders: Avondale Shipyards
- Operators: United States Navy
- Preceded by: Neosho class
- Succeeded by: Henry J. Kaiser class
- In commission: 1981–1999
- Completed: 5
- Active: 0
- Laid up: 0
- Retired: 5

General characteristics
- Displacement: 36,814 tons full load after modification
- Length: 598 ft 6 in (182.42 m) as built, 708 ft 6 in (215.95 m) after modification
- Beam: 88 ft (27 m)
- Draft: 32 ft (9.8 m) max
- Propulsion: two boilers, one steam turbine, single shaft, 24,000 shp
- Speed: 20 knots (37 km/h; 23 mph)
- Complement: 135 (12 officers) plus 90 spare berths after modification
- Sensors & processing systems: AN/SPS-55/10B Surface Search Radar
- Armament: 2 × 20mm Vulcan Phalanx Mk 15 (CIWS)
- Aircraft carried: Helicopter platform only

The Cimarron class was a class of five replenishment oilers which served in the United States Navy between 1981 and 1999. These ships were sized to provide two complete refuelings of a fossil-fueled aircraft carrier and six to eight accompanying destroyers. All five of the class were jumboized in 1990-92 by being cut in two and a 108-foot (35.7 m) section inserted, increasing their capacities from 120,000 bbls to 180,000 bbls, adding capacity for 300 tons of munitions and improving underway replenishment capabilities. The class was retired in 1998-99 after less than 20 years of service as a result of post-Cold War force reductions, and the advent of the more economical diesel-powered Henry J. Kaiser-class replenishment oilers.

| Ship | Keel laid | Launched | Commissioned | Decommissioned | Stricken |
|---|---|---|---|---|---|
| Cimarron (AO-177) | 18 May 1978 | 28 Apr 1979 | 10 Jan 1981 | 15 Dec 1998 | 3 May 1999 |
| Monongahela (AO-178) | 15 August 1978 | 4 Aug 1979 | 5 Sep 1981 | 30 Sep 1999 | 30 Sep 1999 |
| Merrimack (AO-179) | 16 Jul 1979 | 17 May 1980 | 14 Nov 1981 | 18 Dec 1998 | 18 Dec 1998 |
| Willamette (AO-180) | 4 Aug 1980 | 18 Jul 1981 | 18 Dec 1982 | 30 Apr 1999 | 30 Apr 1999 |
| Platte (AO-186) | 2 Feb 1981 | 30 Jan 1982 | 29 Jan 1983 | 30 Jun 1999 | 30 Jun 1999 |

== See also ==
- United States Navy oiler
- Replenishment oiler
- List of auxiliaries of the United States Navy
