= MM-151 =

MM-151 is an oligoclonal mixture of fully human monoclonal antibodies, which binds multiple parts of the EGFR molecule It has started clinical trials in patients with RAS wild-type colorectal cancers (CRCs) that were resistant to other anti-EGFR therapies. It is intended to overcome the problem of cancers becoming resistant to monoclonal antibody therapies.

== Mechanism of Action ==
The EGFR signaling pathway is often exploited by many different types of cancers, and therefore is a common drug target. MM-151 can be used to block these oncogenic signaling pathways in order to prevent tumor growth and survival. In addition, the mixture of antibodies can bind multiple parts of the EGFR molecule, so the cancer cannot develop resistance by mutating one site at a time.

== Clinical Trials ==
=== Clinical Trial NCT01520389 ===
A Phase 1 clinical trial for the treatment of solid tumors with MM-151 began in January 2012. This non-randomized, open-labeled, dose-escalating phase 1 trial was conducted with 112 patients with varying tumor types. There were four participating locations for this trial in the United States; University of Colorado Denver, Horizon Oncology Research Inc., Roswell Park Comprehensive Cancer Center, and South Texas Accelerated Research Therapeutics, LLC. The primary goals of the trial were to verify the safety of MM-151 and determine the dose of MM-151 alone and in combination with irinotecan to be used for a phase 2 trial. There were 3 arms involved in this trial; MM-151 dose escalation, MM-151 expansion in KRAS wild type colorectal cancer, and MM-151 + irinotecan.

Merrimack Pharmaceuticals released preliminary results from trial NCT01520389 in June 2014 after presenting at the annual conference for the American Society of Cancer Oncology (ASCO). MM-151 was found to be acceptable by safety regulations for EGRF therapies in addition to expressing promising clinical activity for patients with colorectal cancer (8 patients maintained stable disease for 4 month and 2 patients had a partial response).

The clinical trial was completed in January 2016, and the final analysis of trial data was published in June 2016. It was found that 21% of metastatic colorectal cancer patients treated with MM-151 over the course of the trial responded positively to treatment. In addition, tumor size decreased in 45% of patients. The results prove MM-151’s ability to combat resistance of other EGRF therapies in patients that have already been heavily pre-treated.

A phase 2 trial for MM-151 is planned to exclusively treat patients with colorectal cancer.

=== Clinical Trial NCT02538627 ===
A second phase 1 clinical trial involving MM-151 began in August 2015. For this trial, MM-151 was administered in combination MM-121 (another antibody produced by Merrimack Pharmaceuticals). The trial consists of 2 parts: Dose escalation, and expansion. The trial is structured similar to previous trials with MM-151 but slightly more selective with patients diagnosed with Colorectal Cancer, Non-small Cell Lung Cancer, Squamous Cell Carcinoma of the Head and Neck only. The trial is expected to be completed in December 2016.

=== Clinical Trial NCT02785068 ===
In May 2016, Merrimack announced their partnership with Baxalta for an upcoming phase 1 clinical trial. Merrimack's MM-151 and ONIVYDE (irinotecan liposome injection, also known as nal-IRI) will be used in combination to treat metastatic colorectal cancer. ONIVYDE is FDA approved and has been successful in treating metastatic adenocarcinoma of the pancreas by inhibiting topoisomerase I function. The study will begin as a phase 1 safety clinical trial, but is planned to transfer into a phase 2 efficacy study after the maximum dosage is determined. Although Merrimack is still recruiting patients, the trial is scheduled to be completed in October 2018.

== Commercialization ==
=== Company Information ===
MM-151 is made by Merrimack Pharmaceuticals – a biopharmaceutical company based in Cambridge, Massachusetts. ONIVYDE was FDA approved in October 2015 and became Merrimack's first commercialized drug, but they currently have 4 novel antibodies, including MM-151, involved in clinical trials and many more in pre-clinical stages.

In November 2008, Merrimack began a very important collaboration with Adimab LLC. Under this agreement, Merrimack was issued a research license and granted “worldwide, non-exclusive, royalty free right to use materials provided by Adimab to perform non-clinical research during the evaluation term.” Merrimack has paid Adimab a technology access fee, research fees (based on estimated research costs), and a fee for achieving certain technical milestones in advance. In addition, Merrimack has agreed to pay up to $13.5 million to Adimab per therapeutic area as certain regulatory milestones are reached, and has an obligation to pay Adimab royalties based on sales of future therapeutic products. Four antibodies (including MM-151) were created as a result of this collaboration, and at least one of the anti-bodies must be involved in the commercialization of a future product for Merrimack to fulfill their obligations to Adimab.

Merrimack increased their total research and development expenses by 16% from 2014 to 2015 (from 138.5 million to 161 million). However, the spending on development of MM-151 specifically decreased by $3.7 million from 2014 to 2015, with a total of $5,329,000 spent on development of MM-151 in 2015. Instead, Merrimack increased funding to support MM-151 manufacturing and on-going clinical trials by $2.1 million in 2015.

=== Investment Information ===
Merrimack Pharmaceuticals is a publicly traded company listed as "MACK" in the Nasdaq Global Market. The current stock price as of November 2016 is $6.16 with a range of $4.39-$9.63 over the past year.

=== Intellectual Property ===
MM-151 is protected under patent both inside and outside of the United States until at least 2032. Merrimack has additional patents and a Patent Cooperation Treaty pending for treatment of colorectal cancer specifically with MM-151 which will be in effect until at least 2035 if approved.

== Future of MM-151 ==
Merrimack is currently in working on choosing patients that have a high probability for successful therapeutic treatment with MM-151 based on key bio-markers for EGFR pathways.
