= USS Cimarron (AO-177) =

Oiler of the United States Navy

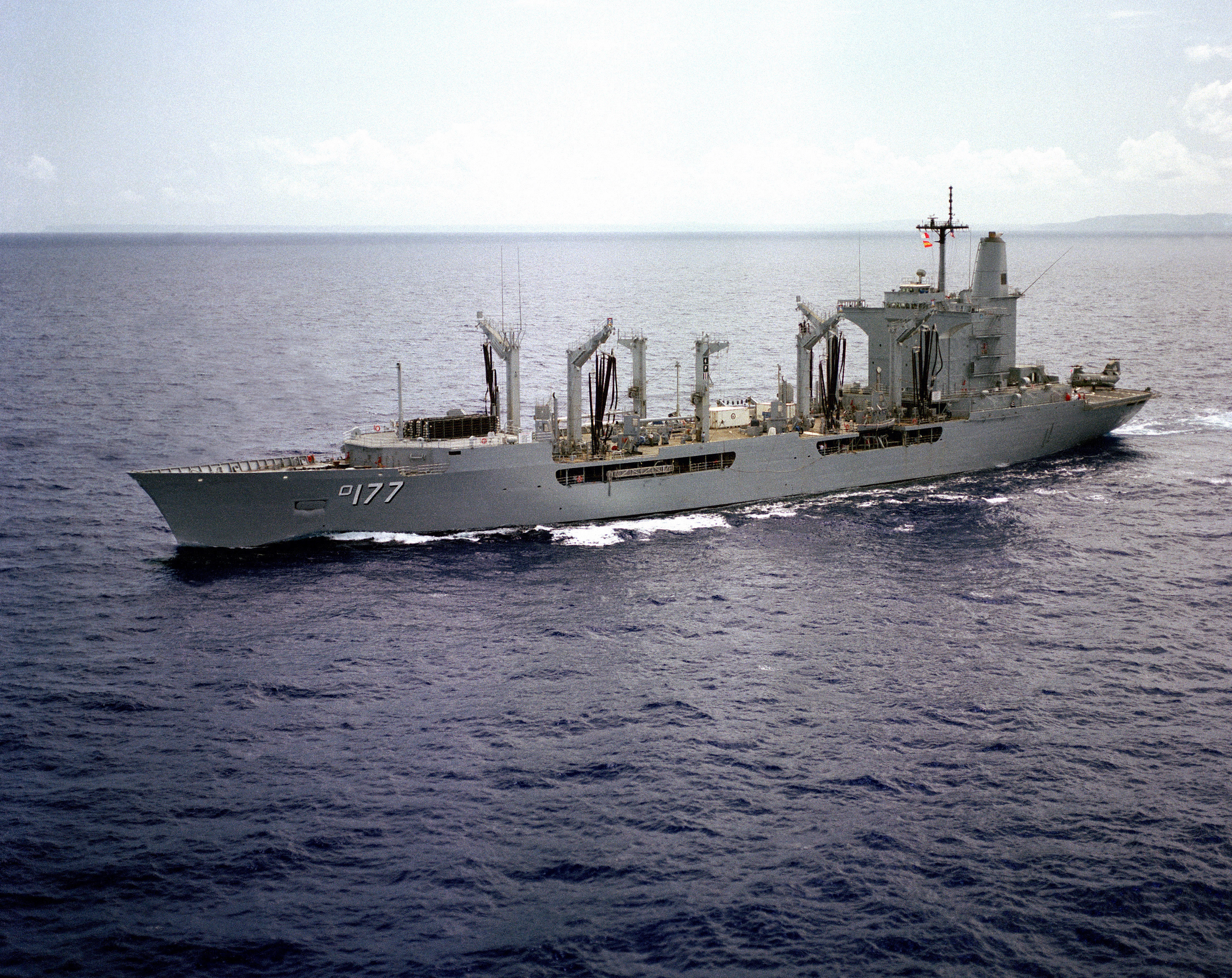
- USS Cimarron before the jumboization, 1983

History

United States
- Name: USS Cimarron
- Namesake: Cimarron River
- Awarded: 9 August 1976
- Builder: Avondale Shipyards
- Laid down: 18 May 1978
- Launched: 28 April 1979
- Acquired: 15 December 1980
- Commissioned: 10 January 1981
- Decommissioned: 15 December 1998
- Stricken: 3 May 1999
- Identification: IMO number: 7638430
- Motto: "First in Service"
- Fate: Scrapped

General characteristics
- Displacement: 36,977 tons full load
- Length: 699 ft (213 m)
- Beam: 88 ft (27 m)
- Draft: 35 ft (11 m)
- Propulsion: Steam Turbine/2 x 600 psi boilers
- Speed: 21.8 kn (40.4 km/h)
- Complement: 17 officers, 235 enlisted
- Armament: 4 × .50-caliber Machine Guns

USS Cimarron (AO-177) was the lead ship of the Cimarron-class of fleet oilers of the United States Navy. Cimarron was built at the Avondale Shipyards in New Orleans, Louisiana (USA) starting in 1978 and was commissioned in 1981 for service in the Pacific Fleet. Commissioned at the Naval Supply Center, 10 January 1981, in Oakland, California. The oiler was home ported in Pearl Harbor, Hawaii. The total cost for the ship was $136.7 million.

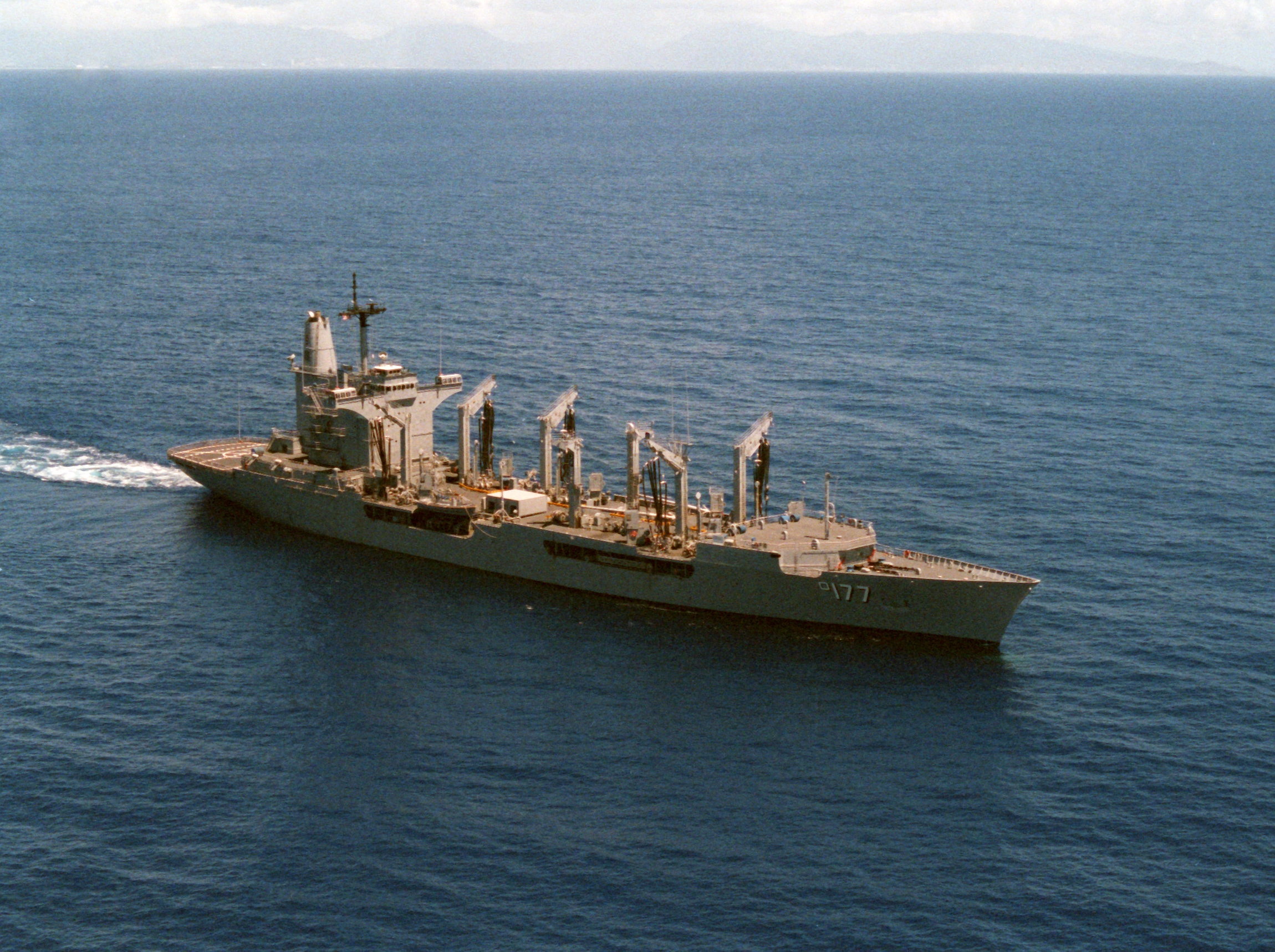
USS Cimarron (AO-177) underway on 24 May 1985

== Jumboization ==
To increase the fueled load of the Cimarron-class oilers, it was decided in the late 1980s to lengthen the ships back in Avondale Shipyards. Cimarron became the first ship complete the so-called "jumboization" from August 1991 to September 1992. A 108-foot (33 m) mid-body section was added to the center of the ship. This mid-body increased fuel capacity by 30,000 barrels and added an ordnance cargo capability of 625 tons. The mid-body also featured an additional emergency diesel generator and two "Standard Tensioned Replenishment Alongside Method" (STREAM) cargo stations. Ballast and cargo transfer systems were fully automated and designed to effect safe and efficient transfer of bulk petroleum cargo. The new length of the ship was 213.25 m (699 ft 8 in).

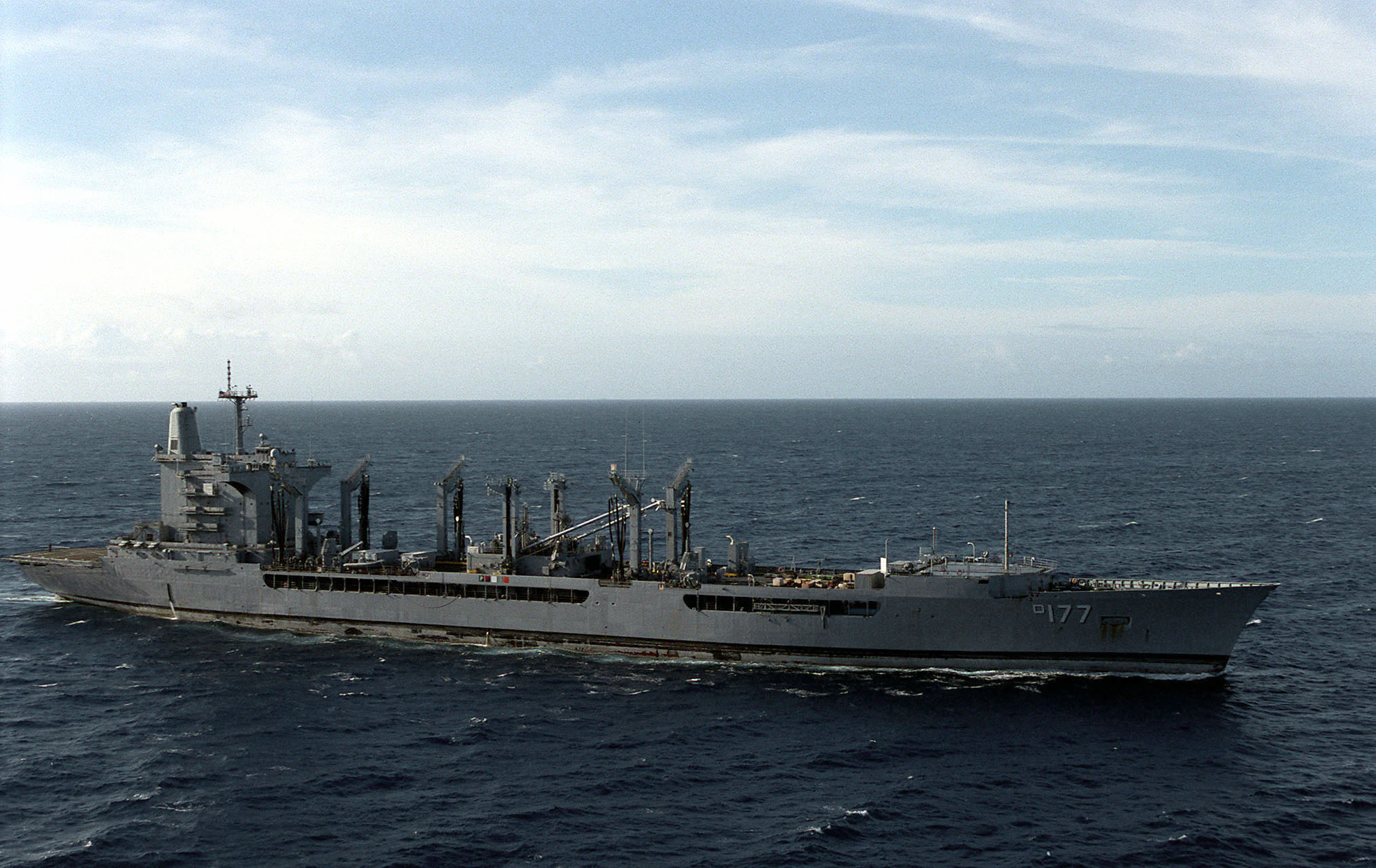
USS Cimarron (AO-177) returns to Pearl Harbor on 2 August 1998

== Operational service ==
In August 1988, she became the first Combat Logistics Force (CLF) ship to implement the Women at Sea program when two female officers and twenty-two female enlisted personnel reported aboard. Later, she was commanded by the first woman to screen for a major afloat command and normally had a crew of about 35 percent women. As of December 1990, she had completed six Western Pacific/Indian Ocean deployments of approximately six months each and was deployed to the Persian Gulf during Desert Shield.

Upon departure Avondale Shipyards after conversion in 1992, Cimarron transited the Panama Canal and made three port visits enroute Pearl Harbor, HI.

On 26 March 1993 following an emergent underway, Cimarron suffered a main steam leak and Main Reduction Gear (MRG) casualty. The backup Electric Lube Oil Service Pump (ELOP) was degraded and when the ship lost main steam, she subsequently lost MRG lube oil pressure. 18 of 30 journal bearings for the MRG, HP and LP turbines were wiped and Cimarron had to be towed back into Pearl Harbor by USS Salvor. Cimarron spent the summer from March 27 to September 27 in the shipyards repairing the MRG.

After the ship was in Long Beach, it was time to be underway on 15 November for more RAS training this time at sea with the USS Kansas City (AOR-3) off the coast of San Francisco, CA. Cimarron made the transit quickly and efficiently and was called upon to assist a sailing vessel in distress approximately 70 miles of the Northern California coast. Cimarron crewmembers acted as heroes that day as they launched the Rigid inflatable boat (RHIB) in 10–15 foot seas and rescued five crewmembers of the overturned sailboat.

July 1990 - USS Cimarron (AO 177) rescues 25 refugees adrift southeast of Subic Bay, Philippines.

In the early hours of 31 March 1994, Cimarron ran aground off Iroquois Point, Hawaii and despite efforts under her own power she had to request USS Salvor to remove her off the sand bar. The ship received only minor damage. In April 1994 she was underway to American Samoa to celebrate the island's Flag Day.

In November 1994, during ordnance on-load, a Fireman noticed a major leak in the lube oil service system. Investigation led to the discovery of corroded lube oil piping in the Steam Driven Lube Oil Service Pump (SLOP) discharge under the deckplates. Cimarron began repairs and deployment was delayed for two days. Also during this time, NIS investigations began due to rape allegations of a female Cimarron junior sailor against a male Cimarron officer. The investigation revealed other fraternization issues and a large investigation was conducted regarding the command climate. A total of 21 personnel were relieved of their duties.

However, to save expenses and in keeping with the Navy's move away from steam propulsion, the class was to be replaced by the diesel-powered Henry J. Kaiser-class replenishment oiler crewed by the Military Sealift Command (MSC). Cimarron was decommissioned in 1998. She was struck from the Naval Vessel Register the following year and her title was transferred to the Maritime Administration. On 26 January 1999 she departed Pearl Harbor under tow and was placed in Suisun Bay, California, with the National Defense Reserve Fleet. She was sold for scrapping on October 1, 2012. The ship passed through the Panama Canal on 15 December 2012 on its way to a ESCO Marine in Brownsville, Texas for recycling.

== Awards ==
- Navy Meritorious Unit Commendation - (Aug-Nov 1990) BATTLE GROUP DELTA
- Navy E Ribbon - (1982, 1983, 1984, 1990)
- Southwest Asia Service Medal - (1990, 1994)
- Kuwait Liberation Medal (Kuwait)
- Humanitarian Service Medal - (25 Jul 1990)
- Armed Forces Expeditionary Medal - (1997)
- Captain Edward F. Ney Memorial Award - (1984)

== Deployments ==
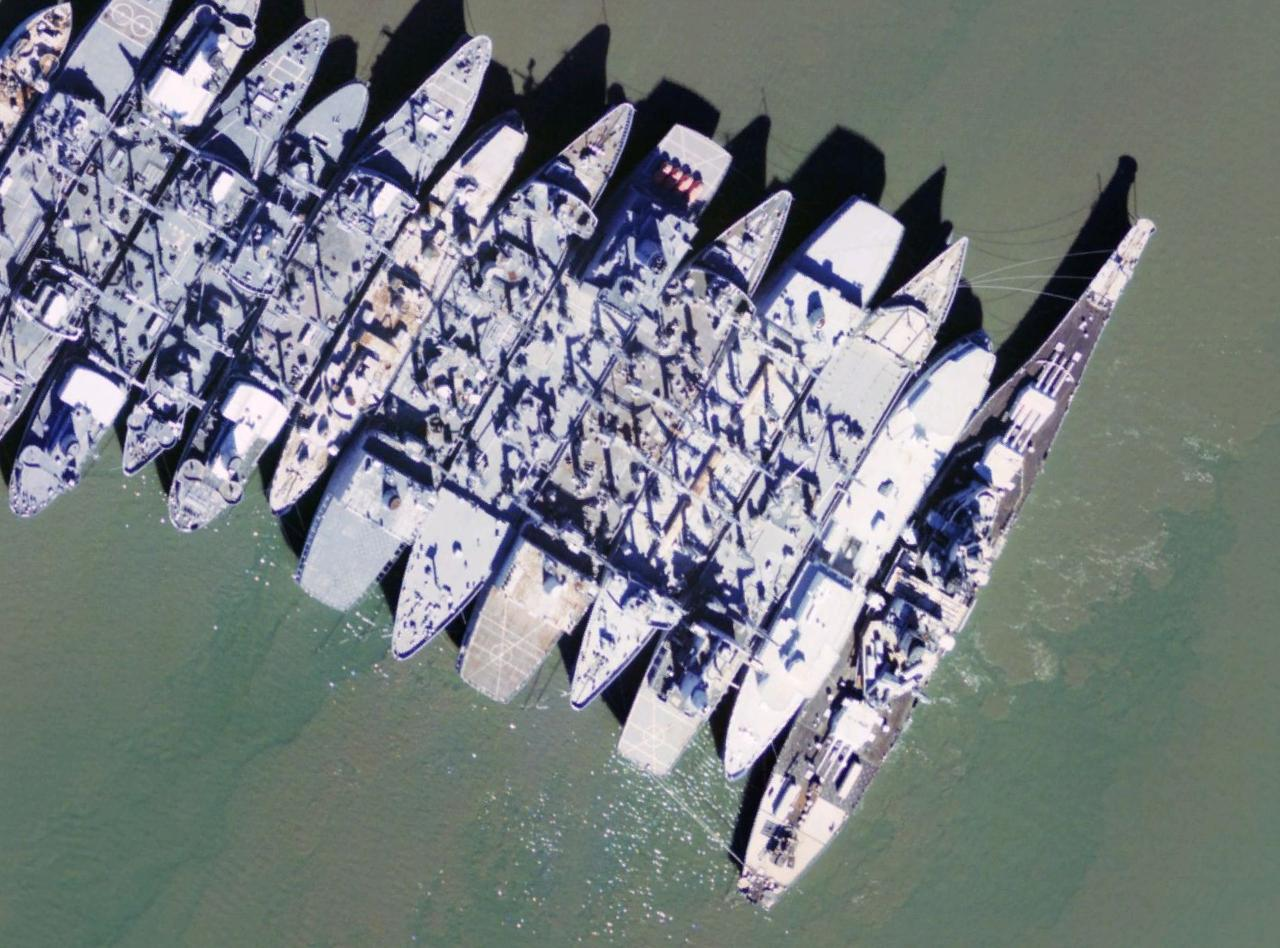
Cimarron laid up at Suisun Bay (third ship from the right).

- November 1982 - May 1983
- May 1984 - November 1984
- February 1986 - August 1986
- August 1987 - March 1988 ("Midway" Battle Group)
- March 1990 - November 1990 (Independence Battle Group)
- November 1994 - April 1995 (Constellation Battle Group)
- April 1997 - October 1997 (Constellation Battle Group)
