= USS Merrimack =

USS Merrimack, or variant spelling USS Merrimac, may be any one of several ships commissioned in the United States Navy and named after the Merrimack River.

- USS Merrimack (1798), a ship placed in service in 1798 and sold into mercantile service in 1801, renamed Monticello as a merchant ship and later sunk off Cape Cod
- USS Argus (1803), a brig laid down as USS Merrimack in 1803 but renamed prior to completion
- USS Merrimack (1855) a screw frigate commissioned in 1856, decommissioned in 1860, and burned in 1861 to prevent capture by the Confederate States of America, best known as the hull upon which the Confederate States Navy ironclad CSS Virginia was built during the American Civil War
- USS Merrimac (1864), a side-wheel steamer purchased in 1864 that foundered in 1865
- USS Merrimac (1894), a collier purchased in April 1898 and sunk as a blockship in June 1898 during the Spanish–American War
- USS Merrimack (AO-37), a Kennebec-class fleet oiler in commission from 1942 to 1950 and again from 1950 to 1954 which served in both the Atlantic and Pacific during World War II
- USS Merrimack (AO-179), a Cimarron-class fleet oiler in commission from 1981 to 1998
