= Merrimac, Kentucky =

Unincorporated community in Kentucky, United States

Merrimac
- Unincorporated community
- Location within the state of Kentucky Merrimac (the United States)
- Coordinates: 37°24′45″N 85°7′43″W
- Country: United States
- State: Kentucky
- County: Taylor
- Elevation: 797 ft (243 m)
- Time zone: UTC-5 (Eastern (EST))
  - Summer (DST): UTC-4 (EDT)
- GNIS feature ID: 498076

Merrimac (also Merrimack) is an unincorporated community in Taylor County, Kentucky, United States. It lies along local roads a short distance east of Route 337, northeast of the city of Campbellsville, the county seat of Taylor County. Its elevation is 797 feet (243 m).

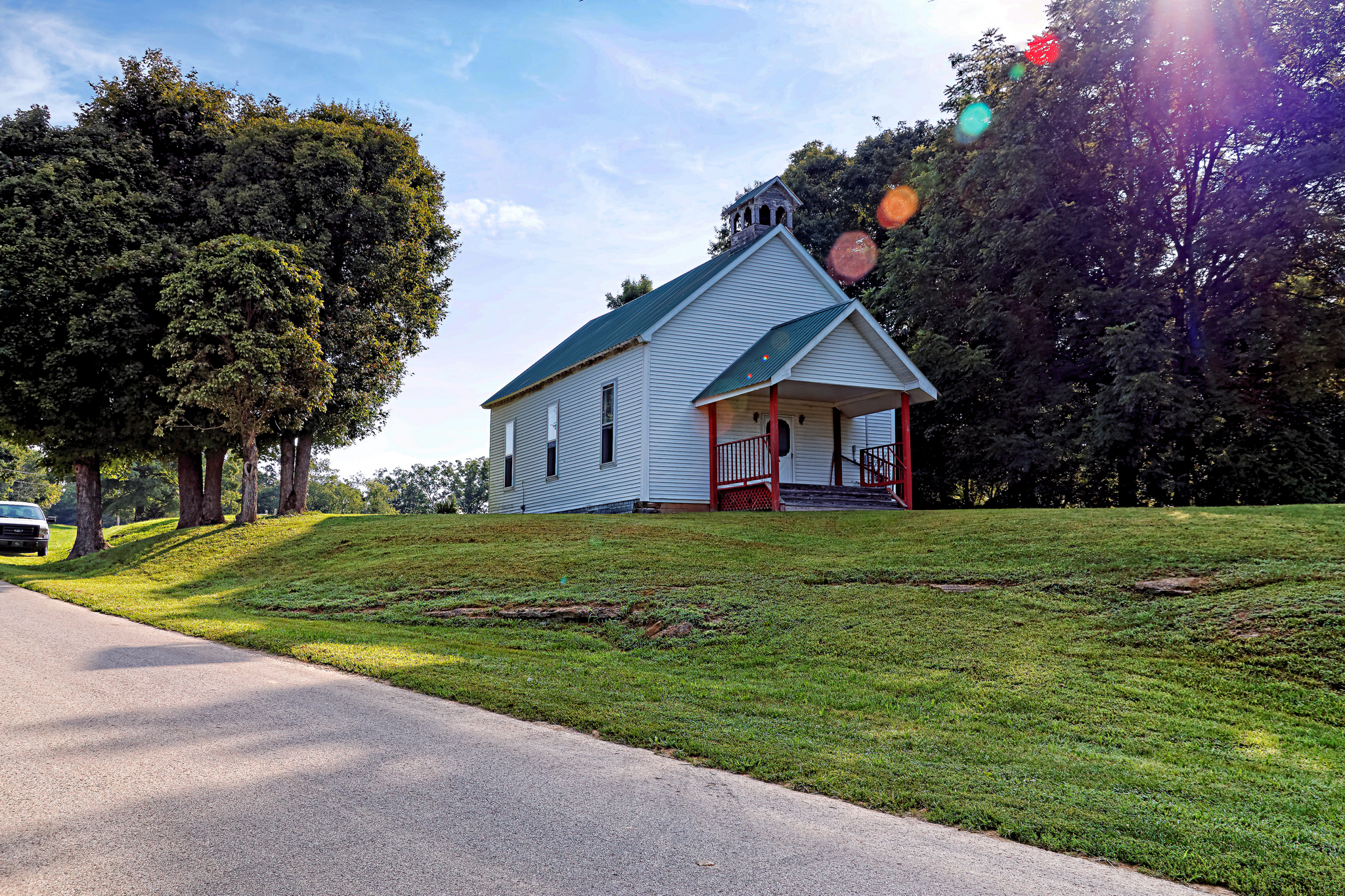
Merrimac Christian Church

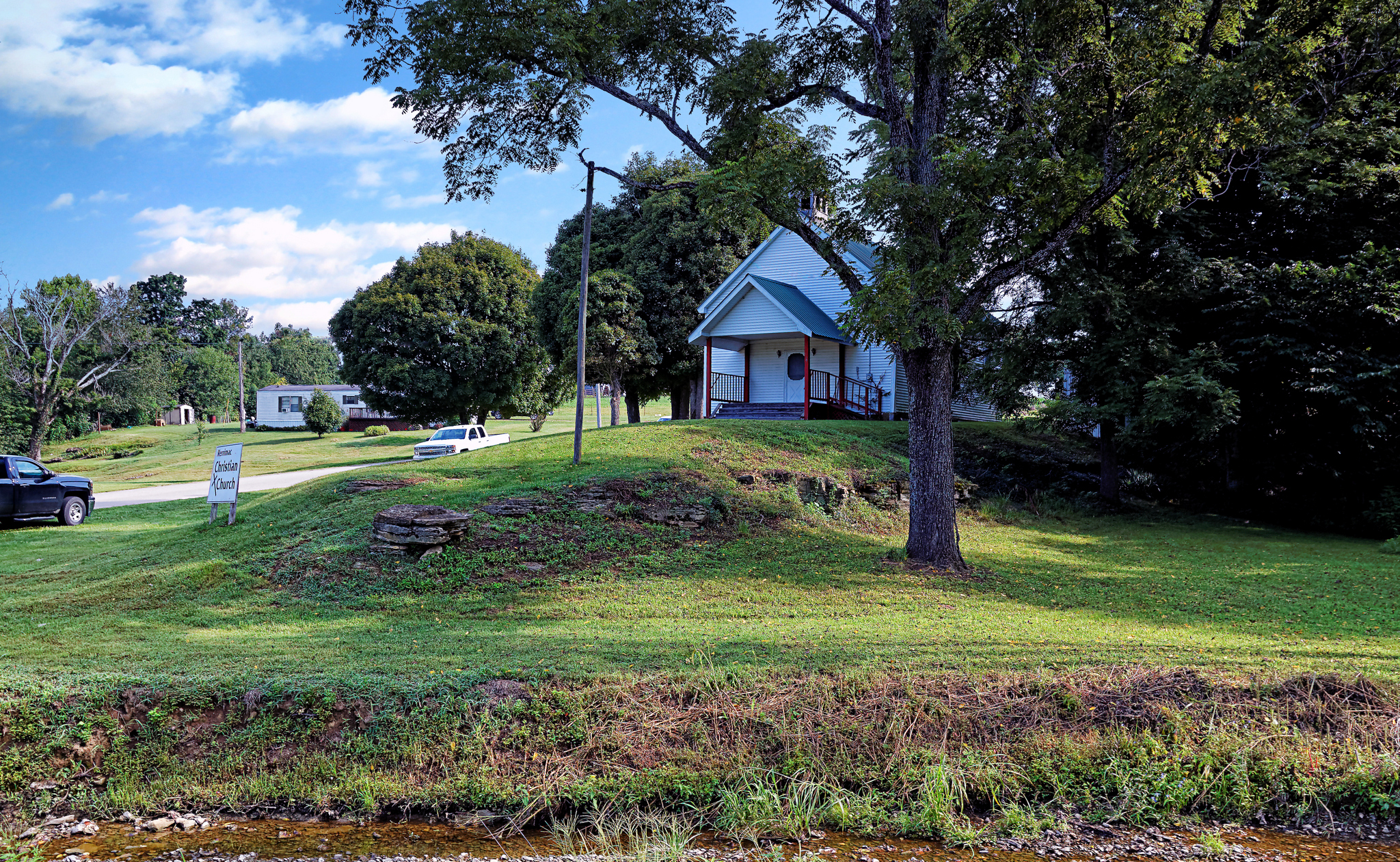
