= USS Merrimack (AO-179) =

Oiler of the United States Navy

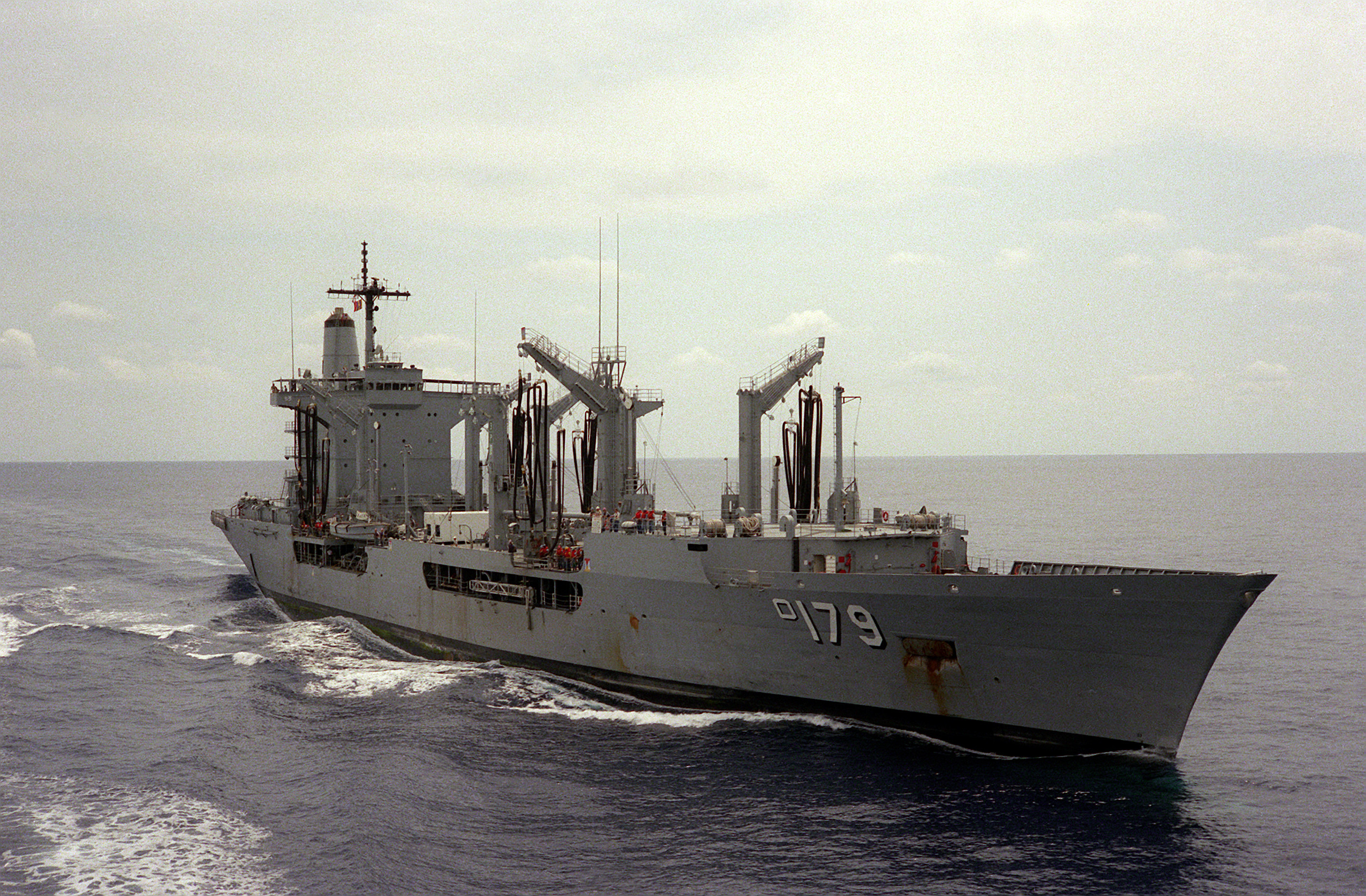
- USS Merrimack before the jumboization, 1985

History

United States
- Name: USS Merrimack
- Namesake: Merrimack River
- Builder: Avondale Shipyards
- Laid down: 16 July 1979
- Launched: 17 May 1980
- Commissioned: 14 November 1981
- Decommissioned: 18 December 1998
- Stricken: 18 December 1998
- Identification: IMO number: 7702437
- Fate: Scrapped 5 June 2013

General characteristics
- Displacement: 36,977 tons full load
- Length: 700 ft (210 m)
- Beam: 88 ft (27 m)
- Draft: 32 ft (9.8 m)
- Propulsion: Steam Turbine
- Speed: 20 kn (37 km/h)
- Complement: 12 officers, 148 enlisted
- Armament: 2 × 25 mm guns Phalanx CIWS; 4 × .50-caliber Machine Guns

USS Merrimack (AO-179) was the third ship of the Cimarron-class of fleet oilers of the United States Navy. Merrimack was built at the Avondale Shipyards in New Orleans, Louisiana starting in 1978 and was commissioned in 1981 for service in the Atlantic Fleet. Total cost for the ship was $107.1 million. She was last homeported at Norfolk, Virginia. Between 1989 and 1991 Merrimack was "jumboized", meaning that, after cutting the ship into two sections after about a third from the bow, a 35.7 m long section was added to increase the fuel load. Merrimack was decommissioned on 18 December 1998 and struck from the Naval Vessel Register on the same day. Her title was transferred to the Maritime Administration. She was scrapped in Brownsville on 5 June 2013.

== Awards ==
- Joint Meritorious Unit Commendation
- Navy Meritorious Unit Commendation - x2
- Navy E Ribbon - x2
- Armed Forces Expeditionary Medal
- Southwest Asia Service Medal
- Armed Forces Service Medal
- Coast Guard Meritorious Unit Commendation
- Coast Guard Special Operations Service Ribbon

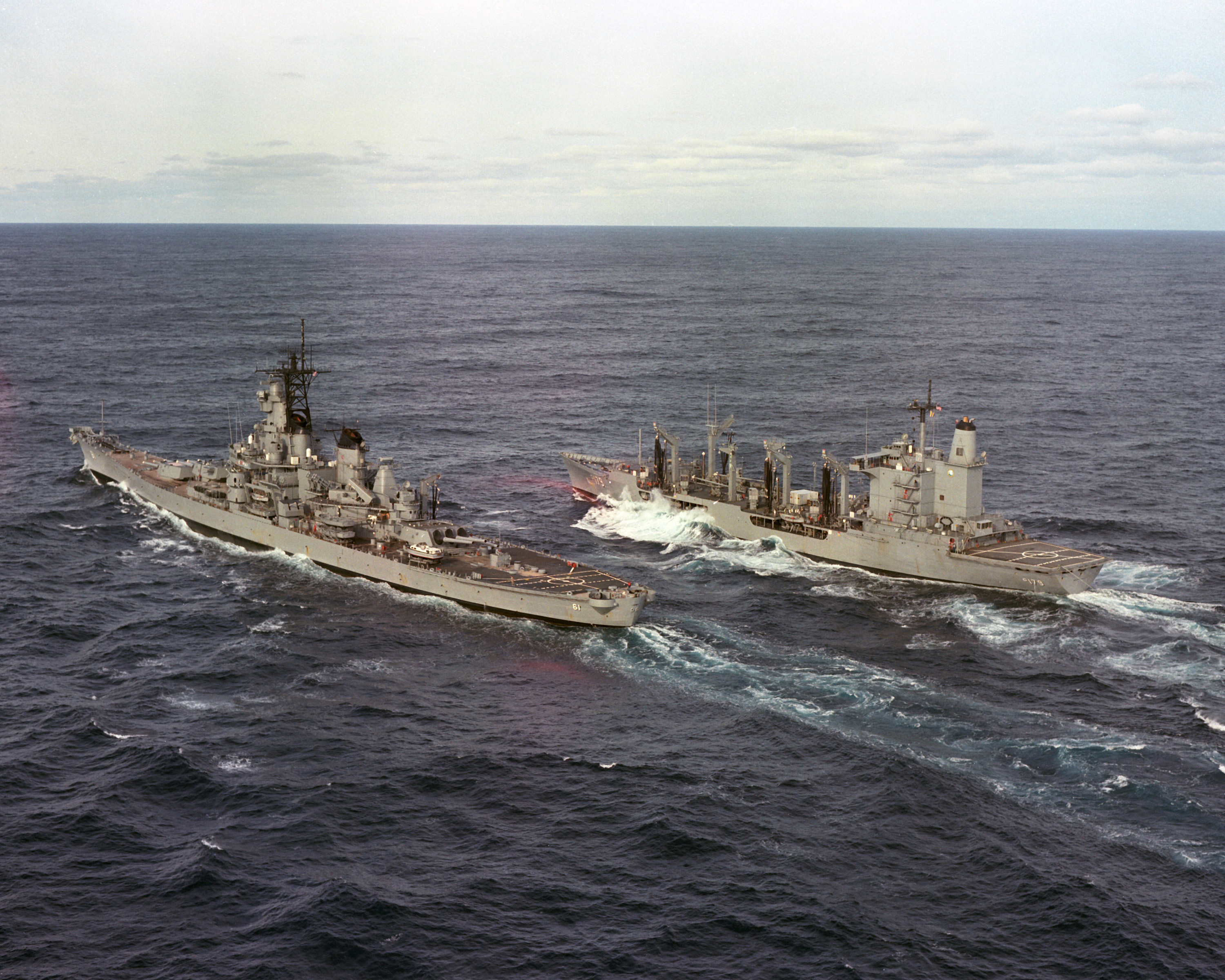
Merrimack after refueling USS Iowa (BB-61) in 1985.
