= Merrimac, California =

Unincorporated community in California, United States

Merrimac
- Unincorporated community
- Location in California Merrimac (the United States)
- Coordinates: 39°45′58″N 121°18′27″W
- Country: United States
- State: California
- County: Butte
- Elevation: 3,999 ft (1,219 m)

Merrimac (formerly, Merrimack, Pea Vine, and Peavine) was an unincorporated community in Butte County, California, United States, located along Oroville-Quincy Road, approximately 2.1 miles (3.4 km) south of the Plumas County line at an elevation of 3999 feet (1219 m). Nearby is Rogers Cow Camp, a campground in Lassen National Forest.

Merrimac was the site of a sawmill between 1870 and the early 1900s, and was the terminus of a narrow-gauge logging railroad. At its peak the town had 1800-2000 residents, a hotel, saloons, a bank, two blacksmiths, and a school. By 1955, only the hotel remained. When Plumas National Forest was established in 1905, Merrimac became the headquarters of the Merrimac Ranger District. The headquarters was moved to Brush Creek in 1930, but the name Merrimac Ranger District persisted until 1971.

The community was located along Oroville-Quincy Road between the towns of Buckeye and Junction House. As the name implies, the road continues to intersect with State Route 70 in Quincy. This road is also called Forest Service Road 119. Merrimac does not appear on the 1958 State of California highway map.

The Pea Vine post office operated from 1856 to 1864. The Merrimac post office operated from 1883 to 1902 and 1915 to 1934.
