= Russ Mobley =

American politician

Member of the Kentucky House of Representatives from the 51st district
- In office January 1, 2001 – January 1, 2009
- Preceded by: Ricky L. Cox
- Succeeded by: John Carney

Personal details
- Born: November 18, 1933 Oneida, Clay County; Kentucky, U.S.
- Died: October 26, 2018 (aged 84) Lexington, Kentucky, U.S.
- Cause of death: Parkinson's disease
- Party: Republican
- Spouse: Carole Ann McDaniel Mobley
- Children: Gregory Mobley Jeffrey Mobley; Stephanie Mobley Woodie; Suzanne Mobley Bennett; Joel Mobley Five grandchildren
- Parent(s): Elmer and Ollie Allen Mobley
- Occupation: Educator

Russell Glen Mobley (November 18, 1933 – October 26, 2018) was a politician and educator based in his native Kentucky. He retired as an associate professor of theatre arts at the private Campbellsville University in Campbellsville, Kentucky.

From 2001 to 2009, he was the Republican member of the Kentucky House of Representatives for District 51 (Taylor and Adair counties) in the south central portion of the state. He did not run for reelection to the house in 2008.

== Early life, education, and career ==
A son of Elmer and Ollie Allen Mobley, Russ Mobley graduated from high school at the Oneida Baptist Institute in 1951. He served in the United States Air Force from 1951 to 1955 and was an airman first class. After serving in the Air Force, he obtained Bachelor of Arts and Master of Arts degrees from the University of Kentucky at Lexington.

== Career ==
Mobley worked at Campbellsville University, located about eighty miles southwest of Lexington, and affiliated with the Kentucky Baptist Convention. Mobley taught there from 1971 until his retirement in 2005, having directed more than one hundred student plays and musicals. Among his productions were the musicals Joseph and the Amazing Technicolor Dreamcoat, 1776, Oklahoma, Guys and Dolls, Oliver! and Fiddler on the Roof.

In 1968, Mobley lost the general election for the United States House of Representatives from Kentucky's 6th Congressional District, which included Lexington, to the Democrat John C. Watts. As Mobley lost the district, 58-42 percent, Republican ticket mates Richard M. Nixon and Spiro T. Agnew prevailed statewide and nationally. In 1981, he ran unsuccessfully in the Republican primary for the District 16 seat in the Kentucky State Senate. In that primary election, he was defeated by the incumbent Doug Moseley, a United Methodist minister. Thereafter, he served as deputy commissioner of personnel and deputy commissioner of parks in the administration of Republican Governor Louie B. Nunn. He also served in the 1980s as the County Judge Executive pro tempore for Taylor County.

== Personal life ==
Mobley and his surviving widow, the former Carole Ann McDaniel (born 1938), a retired pharmacist, have five children: twins born in 1958, Jeffrey Mobley, an attorney in Nashville, Tennessee, and Gregory Mobley, an Andover Newton Visiting Professor of Old Testament at Yale University in New Haven, Connecticut; Stephanie Mobley Woodie, an associate professor of Health & Human Performance at Berea College in Berea, Kentucky; Suzanne Bennett, a retired educator who last taught in the Green County School District in Kentucky; and Joel Mobley (b. 1966), an associate professor of Physics and Astronomy at the University of Mississippi in Oxford. Gregory Mobley is the coauthor of The Birth of Satan: Tracing the Devil's Biblical Roots.

Russ Mobley died on October 26, 2018, at the age of eighty-four of Parkinson's disease.

== Civic life ==
Mobley was a member of Rotary International. He was a longtime member of the Campbellsville Baptist Church.

== Legacy and honors ==
In 2011, the Campbellsville University theater, in the Alumni Building, was named in Mobley's honor. CU President Michael V. Carter, at the dedication ceremonies, said that Mobley "leaves a great legacy in this place."

Mobley's memorial service was held in the center which bears his name.

Political offices
Preceded by Ricky Lee Cox	Kentucky State Representative for District 51 (Campbellsville); 2001–2009	Succeeded by John "Bam" Carney
