= Michael Pollock (politician) =

American politician

Michael Sarge Pollock
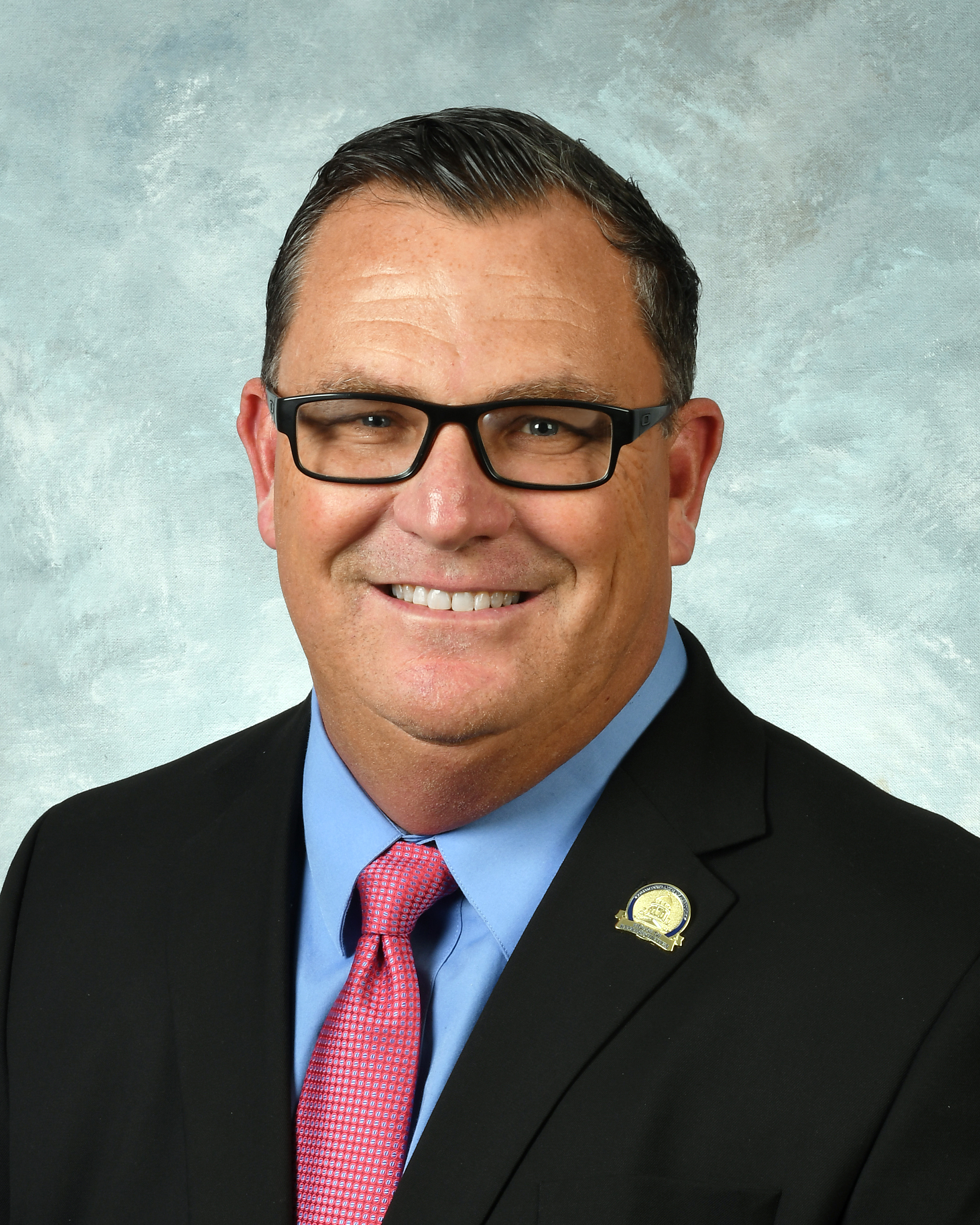

Member of the Kentucky House of Representatives from the 51st district
- Incumbent
- Assumed office November 29, 2021
- Preceded by: John Carney

Personal details
- Born: May 27, 1966 (age 60)
- Party: Republican
- Education: Campbellsville University (BS)
- Committees: Banking & Insurance (Vice Chair); Agriculture; Tourism & Outdoor Recreation

Michael Edward "Sarge" Pollock (born May 27, 1966) is an American politician and Republican member of the Kentucky House of Representatives from Kentucky's 51st House district since November 2021. His district comprises Marion and Taylor counties.

== Background ==
Pollock earned a Bachelor of Science degree from Campbellsville University. Since 2001, he has worked as an insurance risk advisor for Jessie Insurance of Central Kentucky.

== Political career ==
=== Elections ===
- 2021 Governor Andy Beshear called for a special election to take place on November 2, 2021, following the passing of Incumbent representative John "Bam" Carney. Pollock won the 2021 Kentucky House of Representatives special election with 5,217 votes (73.7%) against Democratic candidate Edwin Rogers and Independent Timothy Shafer.
- 2022 Pollock was unopposed in the 2022 Republican primary and won the 2022 Kentucky House of Representatives election with 10,629 votes (71.9%) against Democratic candidate Jennifer Wheeler.
- 2024 Pollock was unopposed in both the 2024 Republican primary and the 2024 Kentucky House of Representatives election, winning the latter with 17,064 votes.
