= Ray H. Altman =

American politician (born 1943)

Member of the Kentucky House of Representatives from the 51st district
- In office January 1, 1987 – January 1, 1997
- Preceded by: Herman Rattliff
- Succeeded by: Ricky L. Cox

Personal details
- Born: November 2, 1943 (age 82)
- Party: Republican
- Education: Campbellsville University

Ray Hiestand Altman (born November 2, 1943) is an American politician. He served as a Republican member for the 51st district of the Kentucky House of Representatives.

Altman attended Campbellsville University. In 1986 he was elected to the 51st district of the Kentucky House of Representatives, serving until 1997.

Altman was first elected to the house in 1986 after incumbent representative Herman Rattliff retired. He did not seek reelection in 1996.
