= Kentucky's 51st House of Representatives district =

American legislative district

Kentucky's 51st State House of Representatives district
Representative
Michael Sarge Pollock; R–Campbellsville
since November 29, 2021
- Registration: 51.0% Republican; 41.3% Democratic; 7.3% No party preference
- Demographics: 87.2% White; 5.9% Black; 3.3% Hispanic; 0.8% Asian; 2.8% Multiracial
- Population (2024): 46,146
- Registered voters (2026): 32,168

Kentucky's 51st House of Representatives district is one of 100 districts in the Kentucky House of Representatives. Located in the central part of the state, it comprises Marion and Taylor Counties. It has been represented by Michael Sarge Pollock (R–Campbellsville) since 2021. As of 2024, the district has a population of 46,146.

== Voter registration ==
On January 1, 2026, the district had 32,168 registered voters, who were registered with the following parties.

Party	Registration	
Party	Voters	%
Republican	16,394	50.96
Democratic	13,270	41.25
Independent	1,162	3.61
Libertarian	110	0.34
Green	19	0.06
Constitution	13	0.04
Socialist Workers	7	0.02
Reform	5	0.02
"Other"	1,188	3.69
Total	32,168	100.00

== List of members representing the district ==
Member	Party	Years	Electoral history	District location
Ray H. Altman (Campbellsville)	Republican	January 1, 1987 – January 1, 1997	Elected in 1986. Reelected in 1988. Reelected in 1990. Reelected in 1992. Reelected in 1994. Retired.	1985–1993; Green, Metcalfe (part), and Taylor Counties.
Ray H. Altman (Campbellsville)	Republican	January 1, 1987 – January 1, 1997	Elected in 1986. Reelected in 1988. Reelected in 1990. Reelected in 1992. Reelected in 1994. Retired.	1993–1997; Green, Metcalfe (part), and Taylor Counties.
Ricky L. Cox (Campbellsville)	Republican	January 1, 1997 – January 1, 2001	Elected in 1996. Reelected in 1998. Retired.	1997–2003
Russ Mobley (Campbellsville)	Republican	January 1, 2001 – January 1, 2009	Elected in 2000. Reelected in 2002. Reelected in 2004. Reelected in 2006. Retired.	1997–2003
Russ Mobley (Campbellsville)	Republican	January 1, 2001 – January 1, 2009	Elected in 2000. Reelected in 2002. Reelected in 2004. Reelected in 2006. Retired.	2003–2015
John Carney (Campbellsville)	Republican	January 1, 2009 – July 17, 2021	Elected in 2008. Reelected in 2010. Reelected in 2012. Reelected in 2014. Reelected in 2016. Reelected in 2018. Reelected in 2020. Died.	2003–2015
John Carney (Campbellsville)	Republican	January 1, 2009 – July 17, 2021	Elected in 2008. Reelected in 2010. Reelected in 2012. Reelected in 2014. Reelected in 2016. Reelected in 2018. Reelected in 2020. Died.	2015–2023
Michael Sarge Pollock (Campbellsville)	Republican	November 29, 2021 – present	Elected to finish Carney's term. Reelected in 2022. Reelected in 2024. Reelected in 2026.	2015–2023
Michael Sarge Pollock (Campbellsville)	Republican	November 29, 2021 – present	Elected to finish Carney's term. Reelected in 2022. Reelected in 2024. Reelected in 2026.	2023–present
