= Jerry Denbo =

American politician

Jerry L. Denbo

Member of the Indiana House of Representatives from the 62nd district
- In office November 7, 1990 – November 7, 2007
- Preceded by: Donald W. Dean
- Succeeded by: Sandra Blanton

Personal details
- Born: April 24, 1950 Bedford, Indiana, U.S.
- Died: February 24, 2014 (aged 63)
- Party: Democratic
- Education: Indiana University Bloomington

Jerry L. Denbo (April 24, 1950 – February 24, 2014) was an American businessman, educator, and politician.

Born in Bedford, Indiana, he received his bachelor's and master's degrees from Indiana University Bloomington and taught school. He also sold insurance. Denbo also developed the hotels in French Lick, Indiana and in West Baden Springs, Indiana. He served in the Indiana House of Representatives, as a Democrat. from 1990 to 2007. He died in French Lick, Indiana.
