= Taylor Regional Hospital =

- KentuckyOne Health
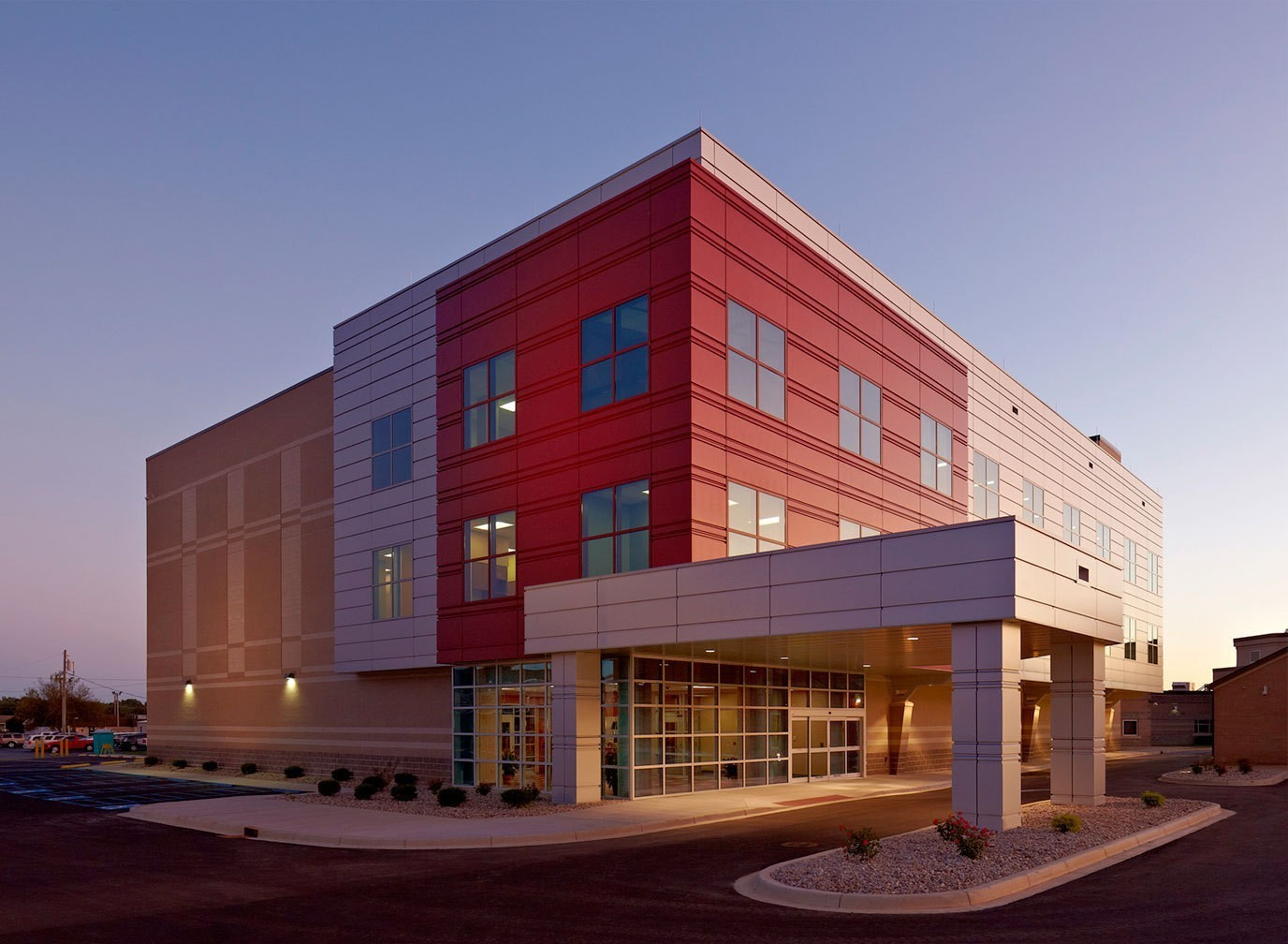

Geography
- Location: 1700 Old Lebanon Road, Campbellsville, Kentucky, United States
- Coordinates: 37°21′56″N 85°20′21″W

Services
- Emergency department: Level III trauma center
- Beds: 90

Links
- Website: trhosp.org
- Lists: Hospitals in Kentucky

Taylor Regional Hospital (TRH) is located in Campbellsville, Kentucky. TRH is a 90-bed facility with services including an emergency care Level III Trauma Center, cardiac catheterization and rehabilitation, 24-hour physician-staffed emergency services, 24-hour teleradiography services, mobile medical resonance imaging, obstetrics, orthopedics, a cancer treatment center.

== Trauma center ==
TRH is a Level III trauma center. In 1995, Taylor Regional Hospital was affiliated with Jewish Hospital HealthCare Services.

== Key services ==
- Emergency Care
- Cancer Services
- Orthopedic Care
- Pulmonary Rehab Program
- Rehab Services-Frazier Rehab
- Spinal Cord Medicine Program
- Wound Healing Center

== Organization ==
Taylor Regional Hospital is listed as a member hospital on the KentuckyOne Health website. KentuckyOne Health is a division of the national non-profit health system Catholic Health Initiatives.

== History of Taylor Regional Hospital ==
Taylor Regional Hospital, formerly known as Taylor County Hospital and Rosary Hospital, dates back to 1968. The hospital was originally owned by the Dominican Order of St. Catherine and was called Rosary hospital until it was sold to the Taylor County Hospital District. In 1972, construction and renovation began on the hospital. Growth of the hospital led to the renaming of the hospital on July 11, 2003, to Taylor Regional Hospital.

In January 2021, the hospital was hit by a cyberattack which resulted in its IT and phone systems being offline. The attack took the hospitals primary systems offline for nearly 10 weeks. An investigation into the attack found the attackers stole patient information, which included names, social security numbers, and dates of birth, in addition to medical record numbers.

== Employment ==
Taylor Regional Hospital is the second-largest employer in Campbellsville and Taylor County, Kentucky, with over 700 employees.
