= James Anderson Burns =

- Born: August 2, 1865; West Virginia, U.S.
- Died: September 12, 1945 (aged 80)
- Burial place: Oneida, Kentucky, U.S.

James Anderson Burns (August 2, 1865–September 12, 1945) was an American educator. He was the founder of the Oneida Baptist Institute.

As a teenager, James visited his father's homestead in Clay County, where he was pulled into the violence of defending family honor. Burns survived four years of feuding; after a close call, he had a religious experience that prompted him to stop fighting and resume his studies. With the help of the Baptist Education Society he planned to study first at Denison University and then at a theological school. Burns and Rev. H. L. McMurray opened the Oneida Baptist Institute on January 1, 1900.

== Early life ==
Called "Burns of the Mountains," James Anderson Burns was born August 2, 1865, in West Virginia. His father, Hugh Burns, a farmer and Primitive Baptist minister, had moved there from Clay County, Kentucky. After his first wife died, Hugh married Elizabeth Collins. James had three older siblings, Robert, William and Elizabeth. The nearest school was 8 miles (13 km) away so the Burns children studied in the evenings after chores. They learned to read from the Bible and an almanac. At night they gathered around the fireside while Hugh read Bible stories and prayed.

At age 14, James learned that a new school was being built 3 miles (5 km) away. He wanted to go, but had no money for books. He spent his summer digging ginseng roots and earned enough money to buy books and his first pair of store-bought shoes. By age 16, James had completed the school's curriculum, but what he wanted most was to learn about Kentucky. When he asked why they had left, his father told him about the feuds. James felt that his father had left their relatives to fight the battle alone and decided to go to Kentucky. His father made him promise to wait a year. A week later, Hugh died from a heart attack. The next year, 1883, James and his mother moved to the old "Burns Homestead" near Oneida.

Soon after Burns arrived in Clay County, his only living uncle took him to the family graveyard. Pointing to the graves, his uncle told him stories of the untimely deaths their relatives had suffered. Burns left with a burning determination to avenge their deaths. For the next four years, Burns earned a reputation in logging and feuding. However, Burns changed his mind following a religious experience. When he and several relatives attacked a cabin on Newfound Creek, Burns was hit over the head and left for dead. After regaining consciousness, he went to the top of a nearby mountain, where he stayed for three days. Upon awakening on the third say, "the urge of vengeance was gone and peace reigned within. I was determined that the feuds should be stopped".

== Career ==
Burns returned to West Virginia, made a public profession of faith in Christ and was baptized. He began to preach, following in his father's footsteps. The Baptist Education Society encouraged him to go to Denison University in Granville, Ohio. After attending Denison for seven months, Burns returned to Kentucky in 1892. From 1893 to 1897 he taught in Clay County public schools. Burns married Martha Sizemore in 1897. They had six children: Myrtle, Dugger, Dixie, Holly, Robert and Marvin.

During the school year 1897–1898 Burns taught at Berea College, where he met H. L. McMurray, a Baptist preacher from Kansas. They became close friends and Burns told McMurray about the vision God had given him for the children of the Clay County Mountains. McMurray agreed to return with him.

The two called a meeting of the clans in the old mill near Oneida. Around 50 men from both sides of the feud gathered to hear Burns speak about his dream of building a Christian school. He said, "We've been teaching our children to hate each other for more than a hundred years. Let's teach them to love each other and then we will have peace. Let's join together to build a school and teach our children the story of our Saviour's love." After several minutes of silence two men, Lee Combs and Frank Burns, from opposite sides of the feud came to the middle of the room and shook hands.

=== Oneida Baptist Institute ===
Burns and McMurray went up Sandlin Hill, climbed an oak tree, looked down on Oneida and picked a site for the school. The site they selected, a small hill where three small streams converge to form the South Fork of the Kentucky River, was owned by Martha Coldiron Hogg, who donated the 10-acre (40,000 m^{2}) property. Soon after Burns laid the cornerstone, men came from both sides of the feud to help build their school. "Big Henry" Hensley gave fifty dollars and Robert Carnahan gave twenty-five. Others brought lumber. The men often worked until midnight and slept on shavings. By Christmas they still needed 400 board feet (1 m^{3}) of lumber. Frank Burns crossed the frozen river in his wagon loaded with logs he had removed from the loft of his cabin. The school opened as planned on January 1, 1900.

When the board of trustees met on December 20, 1899, they named the school Mamre Baptist College in Burning Spring, Kentucky and Burns was named the first president. On the opening day of school he read Psalm 127 to 100 male and female students. The school was now in session with three teachers: Burns, McMurray, and C.A. Dugger. Classes ranged from grades one through eight. Tuition was $1.00 a month. Only a few were able to pay cash. Others brought farm animals, produce or coal dug on the family farm.

In the spring of 1900, Dr. Carter Jones invited Burns to speak to the State Board of Missions meeting in Louisville. As a result, Broadway Baptist Church pledged to send $70 a month to the school. When Dr. Jones invited Burns to Louisville in 1901 to meet with Dr. and Mrs. J. B. Marvin, Burns told them about the need for a larger building. A few days later Dr. and Mrs. Marvin sent $5,000. The new building was completed in 1902 and named Marvin Hall in their honor.

As the enrollment grew, Burns turned students away because they could not find lodging in nearby homes. In 1905 he arranged to start the construction of a girls' dormitory while he raised the money. He made the rounds across the state to any church that would listen to his story. Burns said in The Crucible, "Somehow the payrolls were always met. Bob Carnahan took care of any overdrafts. In due time Carnahan Hall was completed and a home for 50 girls was provided."

In 1908, Oneida Baptist Institute (the name had been changed in 1904) had its first graduation. Five men received high school diplomas. The teachers had studied at night in order to teach them during the day. All five went to Georgetown College, where they were put in the sophomore class.

After hearing Burns speak in New York City, Elizabeth Anderson gave $5,300 to buy a farm. A year later in 1911, Anderson donated $11,000 for the construction of Anderson Hall.

An article, "Burns of the Mountains" written by Emerson Hough, appeared in American Magazine in 1912. Hough told how Burns had stopped the feuds and built a school for the mountain children in Clay County. Speaking invitations came from everywhere. The Chautauqua and Lyceum Lecture Bureaus offered to pay Burns a salary, railroad fare and expenses. Burns delivered over 4,000 lectures in almost every state. Listeners were captivated, and many gave donations.

In October 1920, Burns suffered a mental and physical breakdown due to overwork and complications from influenza. Thomas Adams had served as Associate President since 1917 and was named president in 1921. The school was in major financial trouble. Neither Adams nor the teachers had received salaries for over a year when Adams resigned in January 1922.

Sylvia Russell was named president in April 1922. With the help of Charles Goins, Russell was able to bring the school out of financial crisis. Burns resumed his lecture tours in June 1923. He met his second wife, Margaret Benner, on a tour. They were married February 14, 1925, and James Benner Burns was born November 19, 1926.

Mrs. Russell led a campaign to raise funds to build a home for the Burns family. The new house was constructed on the hill overlooking the campus where Burns and McMurray had selected the site for the school. Russell resigned in 1928 and Burns served a second term, 1928–1934.

== Later life and death ==
After James Anderson Burns retired in 1934, he moved to Anderson Hall. When he died, the following note was sent to his friends all across the USA: "At 4:00 p.m. September 12, 1945, the forty-seventh year of Oneida Baptist Institute, James Anderson Burns, Founder, Builder, and President Emeritus, died in his room in Anderson Hall. The final services were in the school chapel on Friday afternoon with a great funeral oration by Dr. Elmer Gabbard, President of Witherspoon College, Buckhorn, Kentucky. Burial was on Cemetery Hill in Oneida, overlooking the buildings and grounds of the institution into which went his life and through which he forever lives".

== Bibliography ==
- Burns, James Anderson. The Crucible: A Tale of the Kentucky Feuds. Oneida, Kentucky: The Oneida Institute, 1928.
- "'Commercialism' in the Mountains." Courier-Journal, Louisville, Kentucky, June 15, 1913.
- Hough, Emerson. "Burns of the Mountains." The American Magazine, December, 1912.
- "Letting Light into Kentucky Mountains." Courier-Journal, Louisville, Kentucky, June 8, 1913.
- The Oneida Mountaineer, Oneida, Kentucky, May 15, 1916.
- The Oneida Mountaineer, Oneida, Kentucky, Vol. 61 No. 2, October, 1981.
- Richardson, Darrell C. Mountain Rising. Oneida, Kentucky: Oneida Mountaineer Press, 1986.
- Thomas, Samuel W. Dawn Comes to the Mountains. Louisville, Ky.: George Rogers Clark Press, 1981.
- Thomas, Samuel W. "The Oneida Albums: Photography, Oral Tradition, and the Appalachian Experience." The Register of the Kentucky Historical Society, 80, no. 4 (Autumn, 1982): 432–443.
- White, Ann McNielly. "A Miracle of the Mountains." Courier-Journal, Louisville, Kentucky, March 2, 1913.
- Alumni News, Oneida, Kentucky, Vol. 4 No. 2, March, 2010.
