= WVLC =

- Mannsville, Kentucky; United States
- Broadcast area: Campbellsville, Kentucky
- Frequency: 99.9 MHz
- Branding: WVLC 99.9

Programming
- Format: Country music

Ownership
- Owner: Shoreline Communications, Inc.

History
- First air date: 1992

Technical information
- Licensing authority: FCC
- Facility ID: 51805
- Class: C3
- ERP: 11,000 watts
- HAAT: 150.0 meters
- Transmitter coordinates: 37°10′04″N 85°11′26″W

Links
- Public license information: Public file; LMS
- Website: wvlc.com

WVLC (99.9 FM) is a country music-formatted radio station licensed to Mannsville, Kentucky, United States. The station is owned by Shoreline Communications, Inc.
