= Sandra Blanton =

American politician (born 1949)

Sandra Clark "Sandy" Blanton

Member of the Indiana House of Representatives from the 62nd district
- In office November 20, 2007 – November 3, 2010
- Preceded by: Jerry Denbo
- Succeeded by: Matt Ubelhor

Personal details
- Born: 1949 (age 76–77)
- Party: Democratic
- Spouse: Larry R. Blanton
- Parent(s): Robert Scott, Sr., and Lillian Bruner Clark
- Education: Campbellsville University; Bellarmine University; Western Kentucky University
- Occupation: Accountant

Sandra Clark Blanton, known as Sandy Blanton (born 1949), is an accountant from Paoli, Indiana, who served from 2007 to 2011 as a Democratic member of the Indiana House of Representatives for the 62nd District, which includes her own Orange County in the southern portion of her state.

In 2008, Mrs. Blanton won her second term in the legislature by defeating Republican Daniel Brook Tarr, 13,608 votes (57.4 percent) to his 10,118 (42.6 percent). In 2010, she was unseated in her quest for a third term by Republican Matt Ubelhor, 9,962 (57.4 percent) to her 7,400 (42.6 percent). She sought a comeback in 2012 in District 73, but was defeated by the incumbent Republican Steve Davisson, 13,357 votes (54.5 percent) to 11,160 (45.5 percent).

Blanton is the oldest of four children of Robert Scott Clark Sr. (1931–2013), and the former Lillian Bruner (1931–2015), both natives of Shelby County, Kentucky. Her father was a pastor, history professor, and a long-term vice president of Southern Baptist-affiliated Campbellsville University in Campbellsville, Kentucky; her mother was a retired English and speech teacher who served for many years on the Tayor County Board of Education in Campbellsville and was a former adjunct professor at Campbellsville University.

An accountant with Southern Indiana Community Healthcare, Blanton is a member of the Mount Pleasant Baptist Church, Phi Beta Psi, and the Democrat Women's Club. Her siblings are Renee Clark Kessler (born 1952) and husband, Marc, of Greensburg, Kentucky, Beverly Clark Manley (born 1957) and husband, Gerald, of Waddy, Kentucky, and Robert S. Clark Jr. (born 1962), and wife, Mary, of Campbellsville. Robert "Bob" Clark Jr., was named in April 2016 to succeed his mother on the Taylor County School Board.
