= Ricky L. Cox =

American politician (born 1958)

Member of the Kentucky House of Representatives from the 51st district
- In office January 1, 1997 – January 1, 2001
- Preceded by: Ray H. Altman
- Succeeded by: Russ Mobley

Personal details
- Born: Ricky Lee Cox; July 6, 1958 (age 68)
- Party: Republican
- Relatives: Nancy Cox (sister)

Ricky Lee Cox (born July 6, 1958) is an American politician. He served as a Republican member for the 51st district of the Kentucky House of Representatives.

In 1996 Cox was elected to the 51st district of the Kentucky House of Representatives, succeeding Ray H. Altman. He did not seek reelection in 2000.

A 1998 survey by the Kentucky Center for Public Issues rated Cox as the least effective legislator in the house.
