= Nancy Cox (TV news anchor) =

- Born: Nancy Jane Cox; Campbellsville, Kentucky, USA
- Education: Campbellsville University; Western Kentucky University
- Occupation: News anchor
- Children: 2
- Beauty pageant titleholder
- Title: Miss Kentucky 1990; Miss Bowling Green 1990
- Hair color: Blonde
- Eye color: Brown
- Major competition: Miss America 1991

Nancy Jane Cox is an American television journalist and news anchor for WLEX-TV in Lexington, Kentucky. She was also Miss Kentucky 1990.

== Biography ==
Nancy Cox anchors LEX 18 News at 5:00, 6:00, and 7:00. She joined LEX 18 in July 1992. She attended both Campbellsville University in Campbellsville in Taylor County, Kentucky and Western Kentucky University in Bowling Green, having graduated in 1990. She won the titles of Miss Bowling Green and Miss Kentucky in 1990 and participated in Miss America 1991 on September 7, 1990. Cox is a sister of Ricky L. Cox, former member of the Kentucky House of Representatives.

Nancy has won eight Emmy Awards from the Ohio Valley chapter of the National Academy of Television Arts and Sciences and two Edward R. Murrow Regional awards. Cox has a son and a daughter and resides in Lexington.

Awards and achievements
Preceded by Melanie Glasscock	Miss Kentucky; 1990	Succeeded by Sheri Plambeck
