= Oneida Baptist Institute =

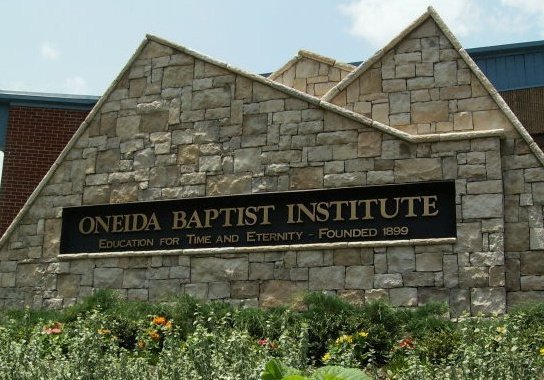

Location
- Oneida, Kentucky; United States; 37.2673°N 83.6494°W

Information
- Religious affiliation: Kentucky Baptist Convention
- Founded: 1899
- Founder: James Anderson Burns
- Athletics conference: Kentucky High School Athletic Association
- Website: www.oneidaschool.org

Oneida Baptist Institute (OBI) is a coeducational Southern Baptist boarding school in Oneida, Kentucky, affiliated with the Kentucky Baptist Convention.

== History ==
Oneida Baptist Institute was founded by James Anderson Burns with the intent of bringing an end to the culture of feuds and violence in Clay County, Kentucky. Burns aimed "to teach the children of the hostile clans to love each other and not fight," believing that a combination of education and Christian love would cause their feuds to "stop automatically." With the help of H. L. McMurray, a Baptist preacher originally from Kansas, Burns selected a site for the school and recruited members of the warring clans to work together to build it. The founder was correct and the collaborative efforts of many in starting the school put an end to the feuding in the area.

The first building was completed in 1899 and classes began on January 1, 1900, with four teachers and 125 students.

The current president is Larry Allen Gritton Jr., who has been president since mid-2013.

== Notable alumni ==
- Bert Combs, 50th governor of Kentucky (attended but did not graduate)
- Jensen Huang, co-founder of Nvidia Corporation (attended but did not graduate)
- Russ Mobley, member of the Kentucky House of Representatives
- Russell Coleman, 52nd Attorney General of Kentucky (attended but did not graduate)

== Incidents ==
In February 2020, the parents of a Kentucky teenager filed a lawsuit against Oneida Baptist Institute. The lawsuit alleges their 13-year-old son was sexually assaulted by a 17-year-old student. The alleged offender was dismissed from the school. The court case has been dismissed as of November 16, 2024.
