= Kentucky Route 66 =

State highway in Kentucky, United States

Kentucky Route 66
- KY 66 highlighted in red

Route information
- Maintained by KYTC
- Length: 46.59 mi (74.98 km)

Major junctions
- North end: KY 11 near Oneida
- US 421 / KY 80 near Big Creek; Hal Rogers Parkway near Big Creek
- South end: US 25E in Pineville

Location
- Country: United States
- State: Kentucky
- Counties: Bell, Clay, Leslie

Highway system
- Kentucky State Highway System; Interstate; US; State; Parkways
← I-65	→ KY 67

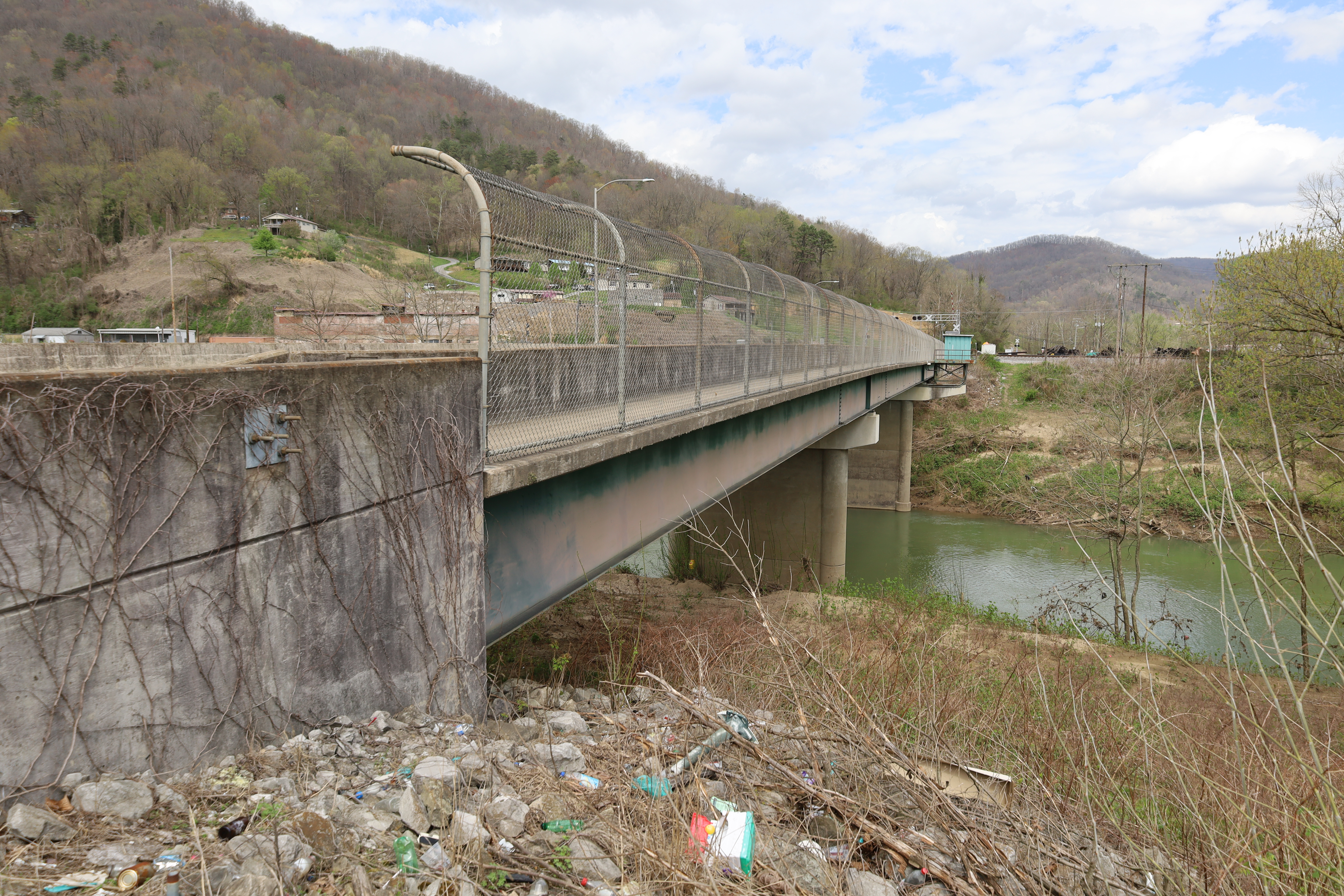
The road crossing the Cumberland River at its southern terminus in 2025

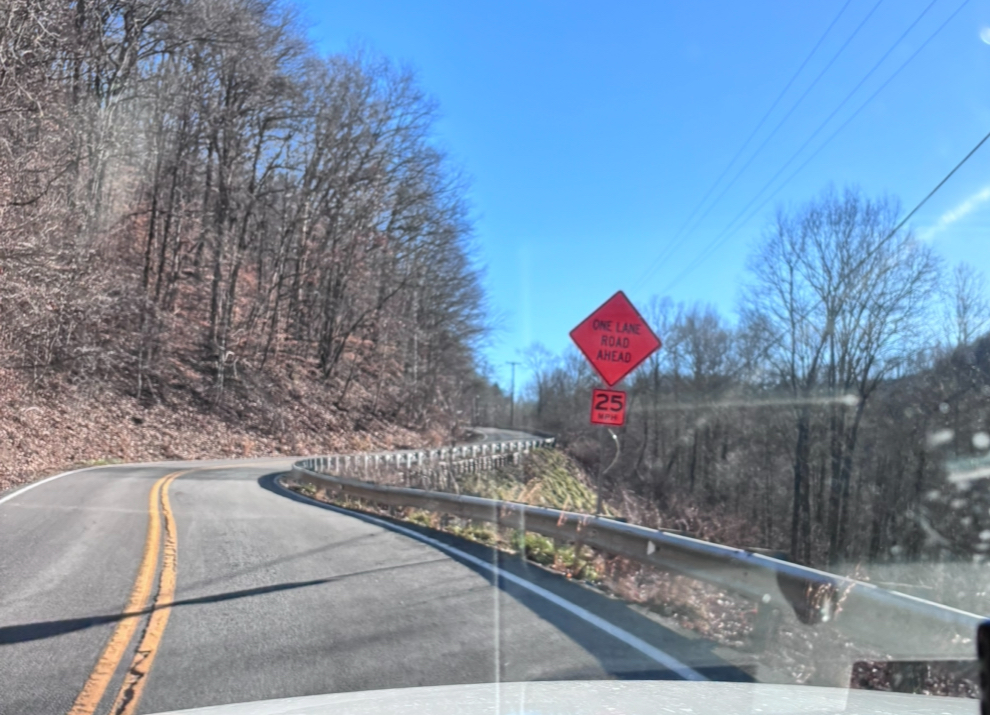
KY 66 on a clear day, near Red Bird Mission, KY

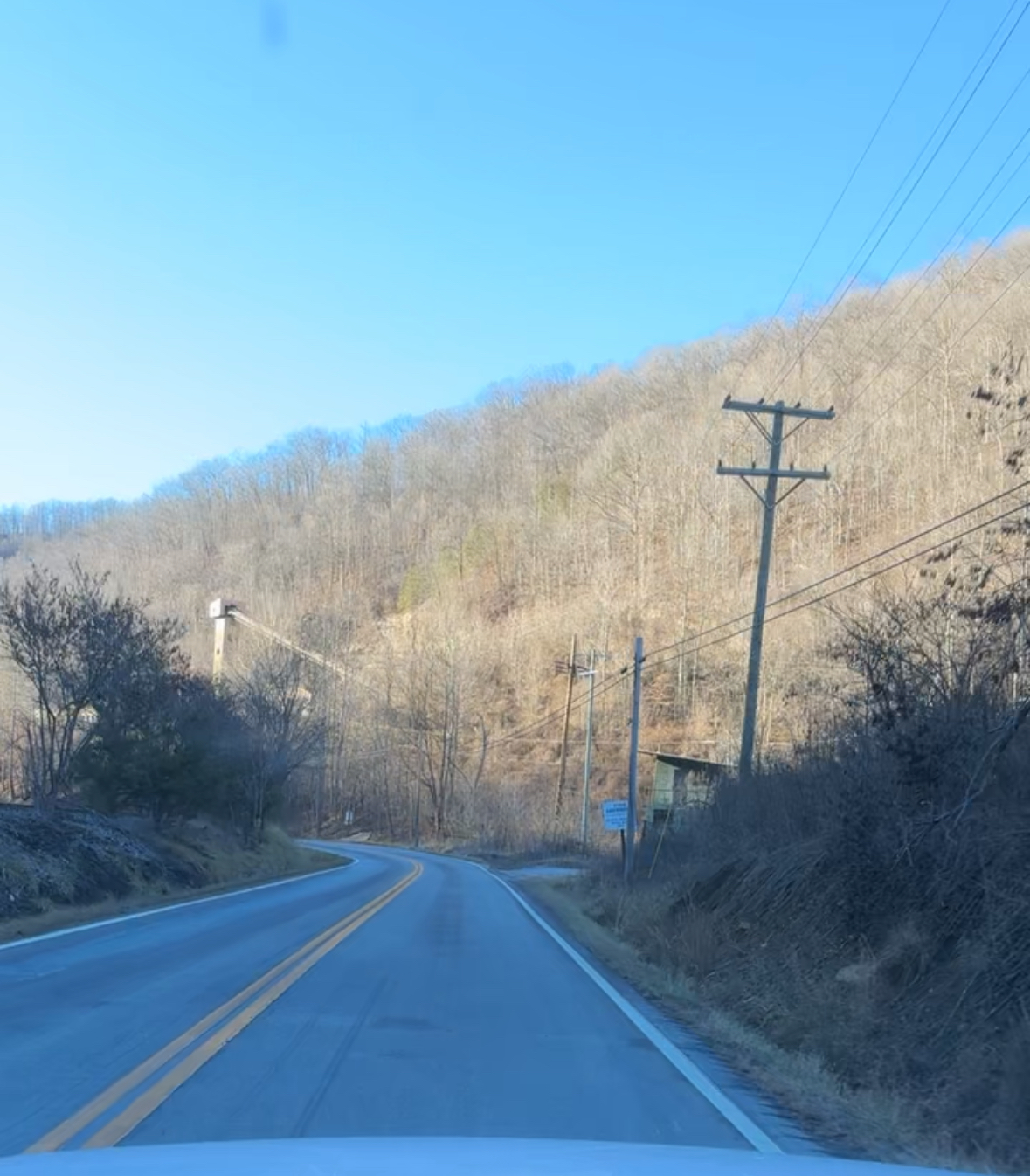
A coal tipple over KY 66 in Clay County

Kentucky Route 66 (KY 66) is a 46.59-mile-long (74.98 km) state highway in southeastern Kentucky. The route runs from Oneida in Clay County to Pineville in Bell County.

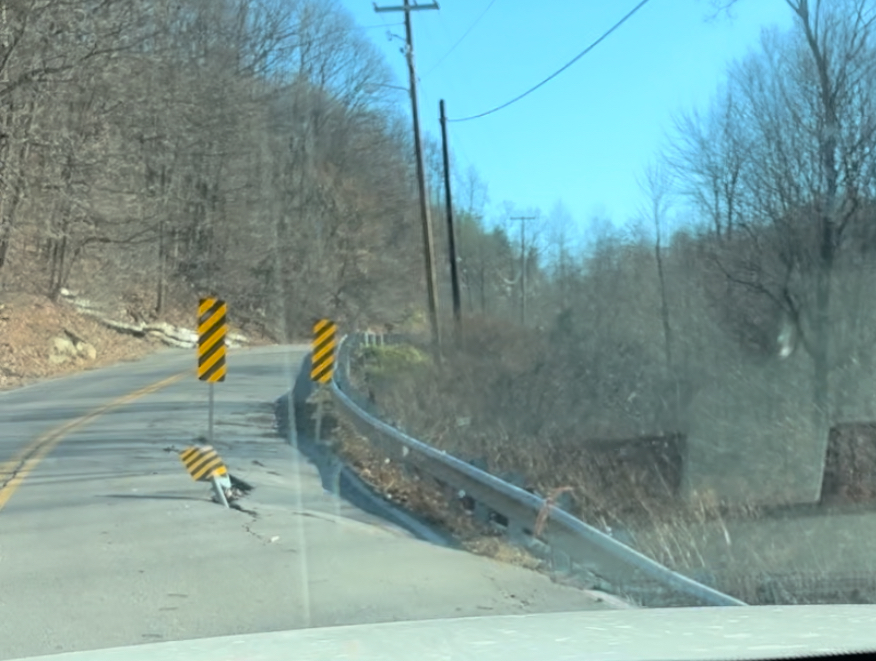
A partially collapsed section of KY 66, yet to be repaired

== History ==
A previous route numbered KY 66 ran from US 119 in Hyden to the Virginia border, which became part of US 421 in July 1949.

KY 66 was formed in July 1949, as a renumbering of a section of KY 21 which was separated due to US 421.

== Major intersections ==
County	Location	mi	km	Destinations	Notes
Bell	Pineville	0.000	0.000	US 25E (Bob Madon Bypass)	Southern terminus
Bell	Pineville	0.223	0.359	KY 2394 north (Dorton Branch Road)	Southern terminus of KY 2394
Bell		1.557	2.506	KY 221 east (Stoney Fork Road)	Western terminus of KY 221
Bell		4.985	8.023	KY 2133 west (White Mountain Road)	Eastern terminus of KY 2133
Bell		17.946	28.881	KY 2011 south	Northern terminus of KY 2011
Clay		22.265	35.832	KY 1524 west	Eastern terminus of KY 1524
Clay		23.359	37.593	KY 1850 east	Western terminus of KY 1850
Leslie		25.380	40.845	KY 406 north	Southern terminus of KY 406
Clay		31.161	50.149	KY 2000 west	Eastern terminus of KY 2000
Clay		39.695	63.883	US 421 north / KY 80 west	South end of US 421/KY 80 concurrency
Clay		40.470	65.130	US 421 south / KY 80 east – Hyden, Harlan	North end of US 421/KY 80 concurrency
Clay		41.119	66.175	KY 66 Conn. west to Hal Rogers Parkway	Short connector road between KY 66 and Hal Rogers Parkway
Clay		44.521	71.650	KY 149 west	Eastern terminus of KY 149
Clay	Oneida	54.467	87.656	KY 1482 north	Southern terminus of KY 1482
Clay	Oneida	54.726	88.073	2nd Street (KY 3014 south)	
Clay	Oneida	54.809	88.207	1st Street (KY 3136 south)	
Clay	Oneida	54.899	88.351	College Street (KY 3135 south)	
Clay	Oneida	55.171	88.789	KY 11 to Hal Rogers Parkway west – Manchester, Booneville	Northern terminus
1.000 mi = 1.609 km; 1.000 km = 0.621 mi: Concurrency terminus
