= John Carney (Kentucky politician) =

American politician (1969–2021)

Bam Carney

Majority Leader of the Kentucky House of Representatives
- In office January 8, 2019 – January 5, 2021
- Speaker: David Osborne
- Preceded by: Jonathan Shell
- Succeeded by: Steven Rudy

Member of the Kentucky House of Representatives from the 51st district
- In office January 1, 2009 – July 17, 2021
- Preceded by: Russ Mobley
- Succeeded by: Michael Pollock

Personal details
- Born: John Mitchel Owen Carney; September 30, 1969 Taylor County, Kentucky, U.S.
- Died: July 17, 2021 (aged 51) Lexington, Kentucky, U.S.
- Party: Republican
- Spouse: Jenifer Martin (divorced)
- Children: 2
- Education: Berea College (BA); Eastern Kentucky University (MA)

John Mitchel Owen "Bam" Carney (September 30, 1969 – July 17, 2021) was an American politician from the state of Kentucky. He served in the Kentucky House of Representatives from 2009 until his death in 2021 from complications of pancreatitis. Carney also served as the Republican house majority floor leader from 2019 to 2021. He was also an educator and high school coach, with degrees from Berea College and Eastern Kentucky University.

Kentucky House of Representatives
Preceded by Jonathan Shell	Majority Leader of the Kentucky House of Representatives; 2019–2021	Succeeded by Steven Rudy
