= Oneida, Kentucky =

Unincorporated community in Kentucky, United States

Oneida
- Census-designated place (CDP)
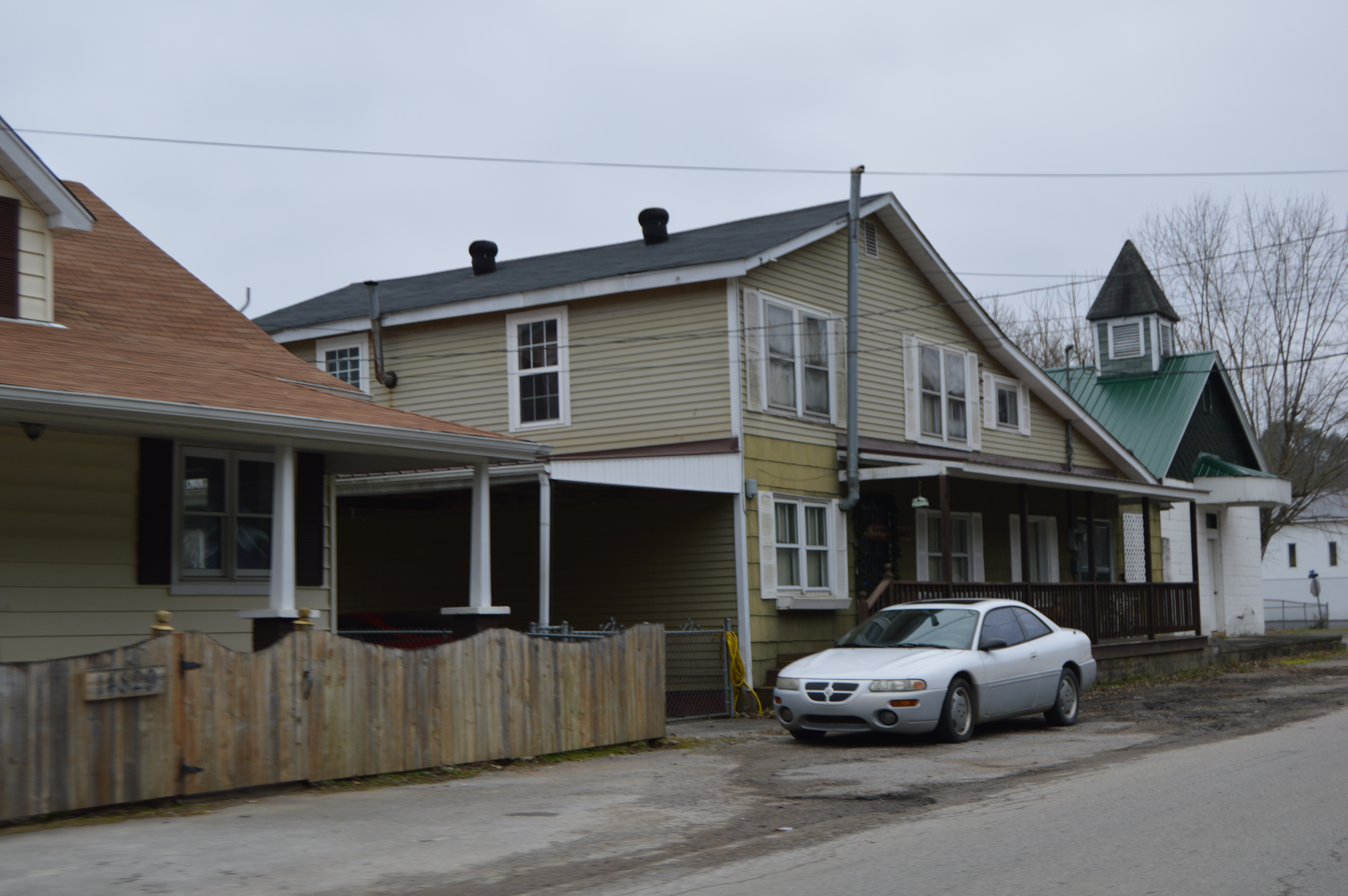
- Buildings along River Street

- Location within the state of Kentucky Oneida (the United States)
- Coordinates: 37°16′10″N 83°38′57″W
- Country: United States
- State: Kentucky
- County: Clay

Area
  - Total: 2.10 sq mi (5.43 km^{2})
  - Land: 2.04 sq mi (5.29 km^{2})
  - Water: 0.054 sq mi (0.14 km^{2})
- Elevation: 778 ft (237 m)

Population (2020)
  - Total: 370
  - Density: 181.1/sq mi (69.94/km^{2})
- Time zone: UTC-5 (Eastern Time Zone (EST))
  - Summer (DST): UTC-4 (EST)
- ZIP code: 40972
- Area code: 606
- FIPS code: 21-58062
- GNIS feature ID: 514357

Oneida (pronounced, oʊ ni: da:) is an unincorporated community and census-designated place (CDP) in Clay County, Kentucky, United States. Its population was 238 at the 2020 census. It is the home of Oneida Baptist Institute. Goose Creek, the Red Bird River, and Bullskin Creek confluence to form the South Fork of the Kentucky River a few hundred yards from the center of the town.

The major road that leads from the center of town to the Leslie County line is called "Bullskin".

== Demographics ==
Historical population
| Census | Pop. | Note | %± |
|---|---|---|---|
| 2010 | 410 | | — |
| 2020 | 238 | | −42.0% |
U.S. Decennial Census

== Notable people ==
- James Anderson Burns, founder and first president of Oneida Baptist Institute
- Bert Combs, lawyer, officer in the Army, judge, politician, 50th Governor of Kentucky
- Jensen Huang, co-founder and former CEO of Nvidia
- Anne Shelby, children's book writer

== Climate ==
The climate in this area is characterized by hot, humid summers and generally mild to cool winters. According to the Köppen Climate Classification system, Oneida has a humid subtropical climate, abbreviated "Cfa" on climate maps.

Climate data for Oneida, Kentucky (1991–2020)
| Month | Jan | Feb | Mar | Apr | May | Jun | Jul | Aug | Sep | Oct | Nov | Dec | Year |
|---|---|---|---|---|---|---|---|---|---|---|---|---|---|
| Mean daily maximum °F (°C) | 44.9 (7.2) | 50.0 (10.0) | 59.5 (15.3) | 69.6 (20.9) | 76.4 (24.7) | 82.7 (28.2) | 85.3 (29.6) | 85.8 (29.9) | 80.5 (26.9) | 70.8 (21.6) | 59.3 (15.2) | 48.4 (9.1) | 67.8 (19.9) |
| Daily mean °F (°C) | 34.8 (1.6) | 38.6 (3.7) | 46.4 (8.0) | 55.5 (13.1) | 64.4 (18.0) | 72.0 (22.2) | 75.3 (24.1) | 74.7 (23.7) | 68.9 (20.5) | 57.5 (14.2) | 46.2 (7.9) | 38.6 (3.7) | 56.1 (13.4) |
| Mean daily minimum °F (°C) | 24.7 (−4.1) | 27.1 (−2.7) | 33.3 (0.7) | 41.5 (5.3) | 52.5 (11.4) | 61.3 (16.3) | 65.4 (18.6) | 63.6 (17.6) | 57.4 (14.1) | 44.3 (6.8) | 33.0 (0.6) | 28.8 (−1.8) | 44.4 (6.9) |
| Average precipitation inches (mm) | 3.93 (100) | 4.05 (103) | 4.56 (116) | 4.29 (109) | 5.37 (136) | 5.11 (130) | 5.55 (141) | 3.91 (99) | 3.29 (84) | 3.05 (77) | 3.57 (91) | 4.82 (122) | 51.5 (1,308) |
| Average snowfall inches (cm) | 2.4 (6.1) | 2.7 (6.9) | 1.2 (3.0) | 0.0 (0.0) | 0.0 (0.0) | 0.0 (0.0) | 0.0 (0.0) | 0.0 (0.0) | 0.0 (0.0) | 0.0 (0.0) | 0.2 (0.51) | 2.1 (5.3) | 8.6 (21.81) |
Source: NOAA

== Education ==
There is one school district in the county, Clay County School District. Oneida Elementary School is in the town.

Oneida Baptist Institute is in Oneida.
