= Campbellsville, Kentucky =

- City
- Seal
- Motto: Urbs progrediens media in civitate (Latin: City in the middle of the commonwealth)
- Location of Campbellsville in Taylor County, Kentucky.
- Coordinates: 37°20′45″N 85°20′44″W
- Country: United States
- State: Kentucky
- County: Taylor

Government
  - Mayor: Dennis Benningfield (previous mayor Brenda Allen died September 7, 2024)

Area
  - Total: 7.67 sq mi (19.86 km^{2})
  - Land: 7.54 sq mi (19.52 km^{2})
  - Water: 0.13 sq mi (0.34 km^{2})
- Elevation: 814 ft (248 m)

Population (2020)
  - Total: 11,426
  - Estimate (2022): 11,599
  - Density: 1,516.4/sq mi (585.47/km^{2})
- Time zone: UTC-5 (Eastern (EST))
  - Summer (DST): UTC-4 (EDT)
- ZIP codes: 42718-42719
- Area codes: 270 & 364
- FIPS code: 21-12160
- GNIS feature ID: 0488742
- Website: www.campbellsville.us

Campbellsville is a city in central Kentucky, United States, founded in 1817 by Andrew Campbell. As of the 2020 United States Census, the population was 11,426. It is known for Campbellsville University, Taylor Regional Hospital health care system, its historic downtown, and the proximity to Green River Lake State Park. Campbellsville is the county seat of Taylor County which has a geographic boundary shaped like a heart. Campbellsville celebrated its bicentennial on July 4, 2017.

== History ==
=== Founding ===
The city was founded in 1817 and laid out by Andrew Campbell, who had moved from Augusta County, Virginia, along with his wife Rebecca Campbell and four of his brothers, James, Adam, Michael, and David Campbell. Campbell owned a gristmill and a tavern and began selling lots in Campbellsville in 1814. Campbellsville was designated by the state legislature as the county seat in 1848 after Taylor County was separated from Green County. The city agreed to sell the public square to the county for one dollar so that a courthouse could be built.

=== Historic sites ===
Campbellsville has several historic sites as listed under Taylor County in the National Register of Historic Places listings in Kentucky.

The Campbellsville Historic Commercial District includes several blocks of Main Street. The historic First Street Brewery one street over dates back to the prohibition and is due to open in 2021 for the first time since the 1930s.

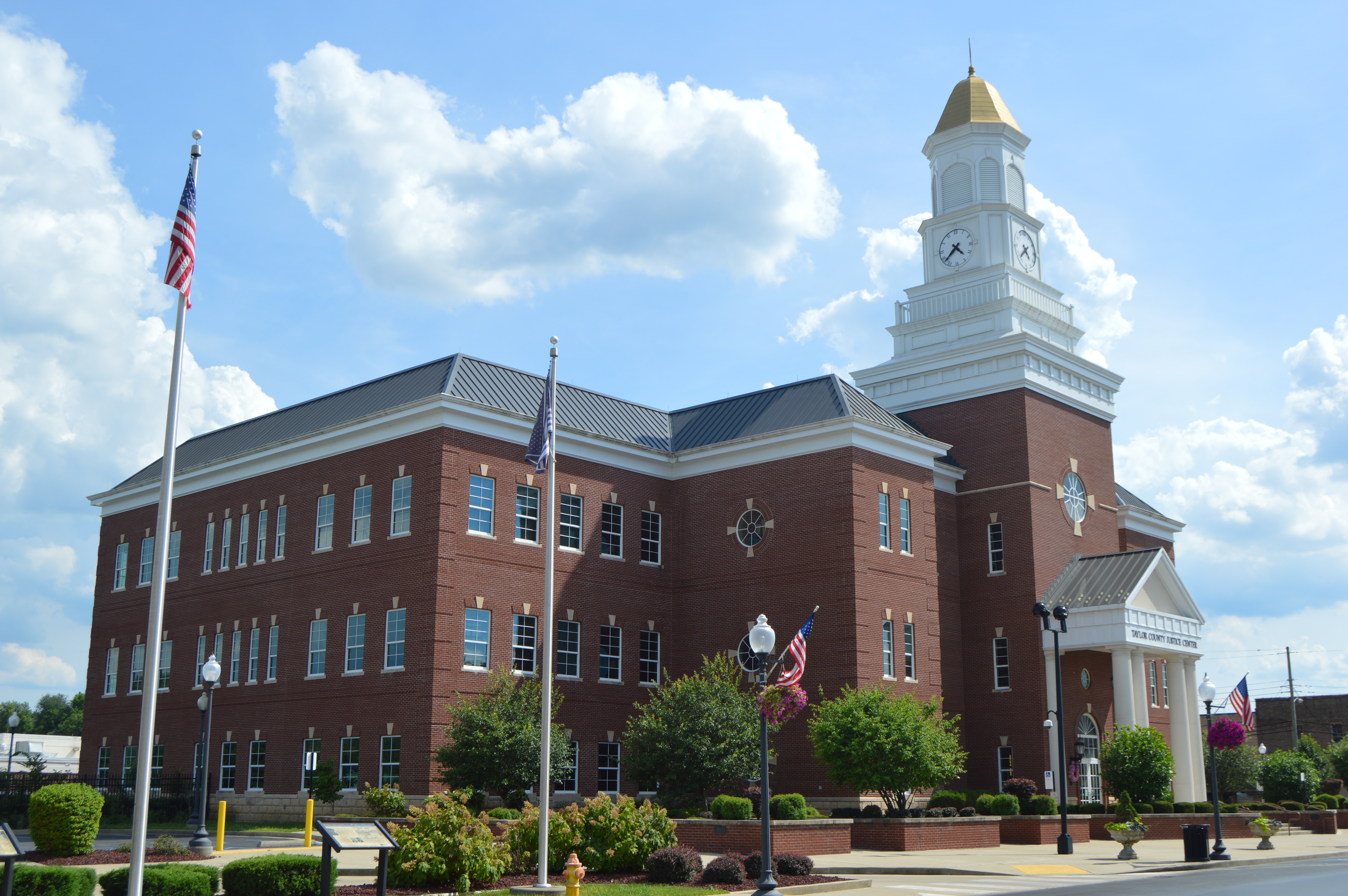
Justice Center, 2017

The city's first courthouse was burned by Confederate cavalry in 1864 because the Union Army was using it for barracks. After the war, a second courthouse was built on the same site. The third courthouse was built in 1965 on a property adjoining the "old courthouse" (on the aptly named Court Street). A fourth courthouse referred to as the Justice Center building was built on Main Street (along with a new adjoining county jail) in 2008. The project removed several old commercial buildings from the 300 block of East Main Street.

== Geography ==
According to the United States Census Bureau, the city has a total area of 6.1 square miles (16 km^{2}), of which 6.0 square miles (16 km^{2}) is land and 0.1 square miles (0.26 km^{2}) (1.65%) is covered by water.

US 68, KY 55, KY 210, and KY 70 pass through Campbellsville.

Taylor County has also claimed to contain the geographic center of Kentucky, in Campbellsville. In addition to the City of Campbellsville motto meaning "city in the middle of the commonwealth", the city contains a station marker placed by the United States Coast and Geodetic Survey circa 1916 which has since been regarded by citizens as the fabled center marker of Kentucky. It is located in front of the Montgomery Library on the campus of Campbellsville University.

=== Climate ===
The climate is characterized by hot, humid summers and generally mild to cool winters. According to the Köppen climate classification system, Campbellsville has a humid subtropical climate, Cfa on climate maps.

=== Parks ===
Miller Park is the main recreational park with softball fields, tennis courts, swimming pool (it is no longer there), playgrounds, walking track gardens, and open space. It surrounds the Pitman Creek that flows through the park. About one mile to the west, Osborne Park (named after former Mayor Paul E. Osborne) is mostly open space and soccer fields. These two recreation parks are joined by the nature trail, the Pitman Creek Trail (a Trail Town project).

== Demographics ==
Historical population
Census	Pop.	Note	%±
1860	446		—
1870	512		14.8%
1880	775		51.4%
1890	1,018		31.4%
1900	1,341		31.7%
1910	1,206		−10.1%
1920	1,535		27.3%
1930	1,923		25.3%
1940	2,488		29.4%
1950	3,477		39.8%
1960	6,966		100.3%
1970	7,598		9.1%
1980	8,715		14.7%
1990	9,577		9.9%
2000	10,498		9.6%
2010	9,108		−13.2%
2020	11,426		25.5%
2024 (est.)	11,820		3.4%
U.S. Decennial Census

=== 2020 census ===
As of the 2020 census, Campbellsville had a population of 11,426. The median age was 34.2 years. 21.2% of residents were under the age of 18 and 17.7% of residents were 65 years of age or older. For every 100 females there were 90.4 males, and for every 100 females age 18 and over there were 87.0 males age 18 and over.

98.9% of residents lived in urban areas, while 1.1% lived in rural areas.

There were 4,477 households in Campbellsville, of which 28.8% had children under the age of 18 living in them. Of all households, 34.4% were married-couple households, 19.7% were households with a male householder and no spouse or partner present, and 38.5% were households with a female householder and no spouse or partner present. About 37.0% of all households were made up of individuals and 16.0% had someone living alone who was 65 years of age or older.

There were 4,951 housing units, of which 9.6% were vacant. The homeowner vacancy rate was 2.1% and the rental vacancy rate was 6.0%.

Racial composition as of the 2020 census
Race	Number	Percent
White	9,355	81.9%
Black or African American	980	8.6%
American Indian and Alaska Native	17	0.1%
Asian	185	1.6%
Native Hawaiian and Other Pacific Islander	5	0.0%
Some other race	250	2.2%
Two or more races	634	5.5%
Hispanic or Latino (of any race)	394	3.4%

=== 2010 census ===
As of the 2010 census, 9,018 people, 3,764 households, and 2,160 families resided in the city. The population density was 1,760.9 inhabitants per square mile (679.9/km^{2}). The 4,114 housing units averaged 817.9 per square mile (315.9/km^{2}). The racial makeup of the city was 89.11% White, 8.74% African American, 0.14% Native American 0.30% Asian, 0.04% Pacific Islander, 0.61% from other races, and 1.06% from two or more races. Hispanics or Latinos of any race were 1.17% of the population.

Of the 4,114 households, 27.5% had children under the age of 18 living with them, 44.5% were married couples living together, 16.0% had a female householder with no husband present, and 36.5% were not families. About 33.4% of all households were made up of individuals, and 16.5% had someone living alone who was 65 years of age or older. The average household size was 2.22 and the average family size was 2.80.

In the city, the population was distributed as 21.8% under the age of 18, 14.0% from 18 to 24, 23.9% from 25 to 44, 21.8% from 45 to 64, and 18.5% who were 65 years of age or older. The median age was 38 years. For every 100 females, there were 83.4 males. For every 100 females age 18 and over, there were 78.2 males.

The median income for a household in the city was $22,922, and for a family was $30,643. Males had a median income of $26,672 versus $19,736 for females. The per capita income for the city was $15,996. About 18.7% of families and 21.6% of the population were below the poverty line, including 37.6% of those under age 18 and 17.5% of those age 65 or over.

== Economy ==
=== Present day ===
Campbellsville University (the local university), Taylor Regional Hospital (the regional health care system), and the Amazon fulfillment center are the top employers.

Campbellsville University (CU) published its 2016/2017 economic impact report showing an annual impact of $106,482,540. Of that, $42.9 million impact the local economy. The university's operations directly employ and support over 13.26% of all jobs in Taylor County, Kentucky.

Taylor Regional Hospital (TRH) - The expanding healthcare system serves the region of 110,000 people. TRH is one of the area's largest employers. In 2016, TRH served 98,900 patients.

Amazon's fulfillment center, known as SDF1, is located near the technology park.

Campbellsville is home to the Heartland Commerce and Technology Park (HCTP). The park's initial tenant is an automotive components manufacturer, the INFAC Corporation. In June 2017, HCTP received a "Build-Ready" certification to attract new companies.

Tourism is also part of the local economy because of nearby Green River Lake and Green River Lake State Park.

=== Historical ===
In the 20th century, Campbellsville was a regional center of industry (agriculture, lumber, textiles, milling, automotive, distribution, oil and gas, light manufacturing, education, healthcare, and tourism).

For decades, employment in the area was dominated by a large textile plant, formerly Union Underwear and since Fruit of the Loom. It closed in 1998 due to cost cutting measures, with production moving to Latin America. Shortly thereafter, another notable employer closed, the Indiana-based Batesville Casket Company.

In 1969, the booming petroleum business was shut down because of environmental concerns of excess salt water disposal. In 2008, attempts failed to revitalize oil reserves because of water infiltration.

==== Legacy ====
The area is home to wood-milling companies that produce interior trim products (Cox Interior, Wholesale Hardwoods).

Campbellsville Industries (CI), "The Steeple People," is the oldest and largest steeple and tower manufacturer in the United States. CI has more than 15,000 installations located throughout the United States and Canada. CI claims the record for the world's largest prefabricated church steeple at 229 ft at the First Baptist Church in Huntsville, Alabama.

Campbellsville is home to the last Druther's (Burger Queen) restaurant in operation.

==== Media ====
Local print, radio, and TV:

- The local weekly newspaper, Central Kentucky News-Journal, has been published since 1910.
- WVLC 99.9 FM country music, Campbellsville
- WCKQ 104.1 FM Adult contemporary music, Campbellsville
- WGRK 103.1 Country, Greensburg
- WTCO 1450 AM Rock, Campbellsville
- WLCU TV, Campbellsville University
- Green River Media, digital news website launched in August 2025

== Law and government ==
Campbellsville is a home rule-class city in and the county seat of Taylor County, Kentucky, United States.

The Campbellsville City Council is made up of twelve elected members. During city council meetings held monthly, the mayor presides and all thirteen members have voting rights.

== Education ==
Campbellsville is home to Campbellsville University, founded in 1906 as an academy.

School districts with portions of Campbellsville include:

- Campbellsville Independent School District
- Taylor County School District
- Kentucky Christian Academy-Private school Ages 3 through High School-Accredited through the Association of Christian Schools International.

Campbellsville has two local public schools, Campbellsville High School and Taylor County High School, for each district.

Campbellsville has a lending library, the Taylor County Public Library.

== Transportation ==
Public transportation is limited. RTEC provides public transit service that serves a 13-county area in southeast Kentucky.

=== Airports ===
Campbellsville does have a local airport, the Taylor County Airport (FAA Identifier: AAS). It is 2.5 miles from downtown Campbellsville.

=== Roadways ===
Campbellsville is accessible by two-lane roadways. The closest four-lane roadway is the Bluegrass Parkway.

== Notable people ==
- Sandra Blanton, former member of the Indiana House of Representatives; raised in Campbellsville
- Nancy Cox, 1990 Miss Kentucky; Lexington television reporter; born and raised in Campbellsville
- Zack Cox, former Arkansas Razorback baseball player, Current professional baseball player
- Clem Haskins, former college and professional basketball player and college basketball coach at University of Minnesota
- J. B. Holmes, professional golfer
- Russ Mobley, state representative from 2001 to 2009
- Max Wise (born 1975), former FBI agent, serving as a member of the Kentucky Senate
- Malachi Corley, NFL player, currently playing for the Cleveland Browns.

== Sister cities ==
Campbellsville is twinned with Buncrana in County Donegal, Ireland.
