= Campbellsville University =

Christian university in Campbellsville, Kentucky, US

- Former names: Russell Creek Academy (1906–1924); Campbellsville Junior College (1924–1959); Campbellsville College (1959–1996)
- Type: Private
- Established: 1906; 120 years ago
- Academic affiliations: Appalachian College Association, Association of Independent Kentucky Colleges and Universities
- President: Joseph Hopkins
- Provost: Jeanette Parker
- Faculty: 463
- Students: 12,209
- Undergraduates: 4,150
- Postgraduates: 7,667
- Location: Campbellsville, Kentucky, United States; 37°20′39″N 85°20′52″W
- Colors: Campbellsville main campus: Maroon & Gray; Campbellsville Harrodsburg campus: Maroon & Gray
- Nickname: Tigers
- Sporting affiliations: Campbellsville main campus: NAIA – Mid-South; NCCAA Division I – Mid-East; Campbellsville Harrodsburg campus: NCCAA Division II – Mid-East
- Website: campbellsville.edu

Campbellsville University (CU) is a private Christian university in Campbellsville, Kentucky, United States. It was founded as Russell Creek Academy and enrolls more than 12,000 students. The university offers associate, bachelor's, and master's degrees.

In 2014, the university trustees ended its covenant agreement with the Kentucky Baptist Convention (Southern Baptist Convention), but vowed to uphold the ideals.

In 2024, the university released a number of faculty and staff due to increasing financial struggles and decreasing enrollment.

== History ==
Campbellsville University traces its origins to the founding in 1906 of Russell Creek Academy by the Russell Creek Baptist Association. The academy gradually became a junior college in 1924, later developed its offerings and a four-year curriculum, becoming accredited as a college in 1959. With an expansion of graduate programs, in 1996, the college gained university status.

In 2014, the university began to disassociate with the Kentucky Baptist Convention (Southern Baptist Convention) so it could elect trustees independently. The following year, it entered into a mission partnership with the American Baptist Churches USA.

In February 2017, the CU field house was damaged in a fire. The university planned to raze the old structure and rebuild on the same spot. The new structure was expected to be available in time for the new football season in mid-August.

== Academics ==
=== School of Music ===
The Gosser Fine Arts Center is home to Campbellsville University's School of Music. Housed in this complex are classrooms, practice rooms, faculty studios, offices, a computer lab, a piano lab, an instrumental rehearsal hall, a choral rehearsal hall, and the Gheens Recital Hall.

=== School of Art ===
Next to the Gosser Fine Arts Center is the university's School of Art. Like Gosser, the School of Art main building also has classrooms, and is to have a computer lab for students who want to learn about art. The School also has a Gallery building and the Tesseneer complex (which has a printing press room and a classroom), that were once houses.

=== School of Education ===
When Campbellsville College gained university status in 1996, the re-organized governance included one college of Arts and Sciences and five schools, including the School of Education, which oversees the preparation of teachers. In the fall of 1996, the School of Education moved its offices into Carter Hall and in 2006 into the new School of Education building. The preparation of teachers has expanded to offering graduate education and online education in a wide variety of certifications and advanced roles. The university offers programs in Louisville, Somerset, Harrodsburg and Elizabethtown in addition to the main campus. The School of Education has been accredited by the National Council for the Accreditation of Teacher Education (NCATE) and the Kentucky Education Professional Standards Board (EPSB) in 2007 and 2012 and by the Council of Accreditation of Educator Preparation (CAEP) and EPSB in 2019.

=== School of Chiropractic ===
As part of the university's commitment to health sciences, the School of Chiropractic was added in 2022. The Doctor of Chiropractic program is designed to provide graduate students with a comprehensive education in spinal health, musculoskeletal care, and holistic patient management. Campbellsville University's School of Chiropractic stands out as one of the few chiropractic programs in the region.

=== Rankings ===
Campbellsville University was ranked #88 (tie) in the Regional Universities South category of the 2022–23 Best Colleges rankings by U.S. News & World Report. The institution was also ranked #84 in the Top Performers in Social Mobility category.

== Campuses and centers ==
The 80-acre (320,000 m^{2}) campus is situated in the center of Kentucky, about a half mile from downtown Campbellsville, population 9,000. Another portion of the campus, Clay Hill Memorial Forest, is seven miles (11 km) from campus. It is a 135-acre (0.55 km^{2}) educational and research woodland that is being developed by the Division of Natural Science as a regional center for environmental education and research. Also, Green River Lake, a 10,000-acre (40 km^{2}) recreational state park, is five miles (8 km) from campus.

=== Harrodsburg campus ===
Campbellsville University Harrodsburg is developing into a full second campus, not simply a satellite. It has dorms and sports teams.

=== Residence halls ===
Nearly half of the students enrolled at CU live on campus.

- The Residence Village (women)
- The Residence Village (men)
- Broadway
- North Hall
- South Hall East
- South Hall West
- Stapp Hall
- Campbellsville University Apartments

=== Gallery ===
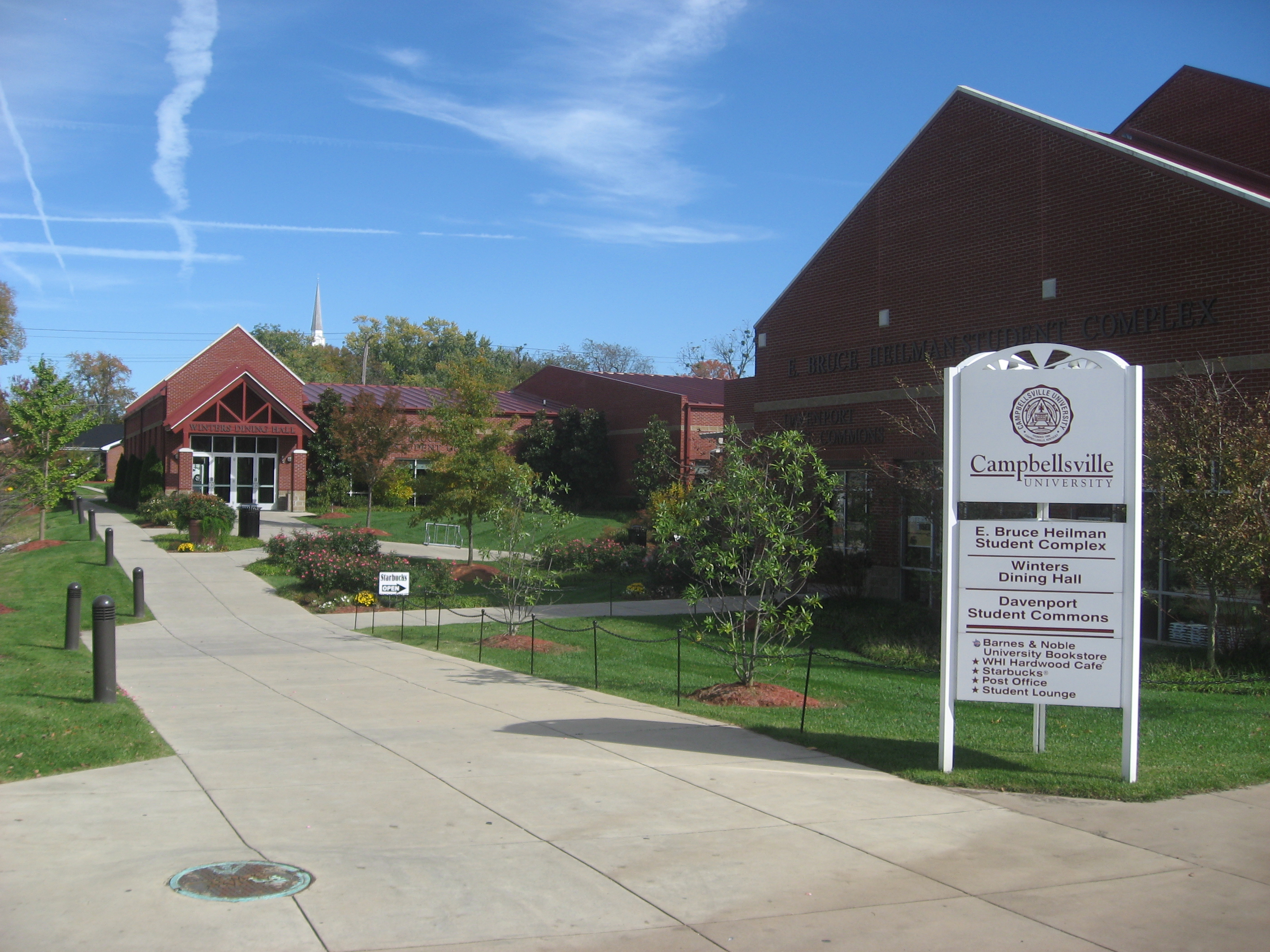
CU Campus

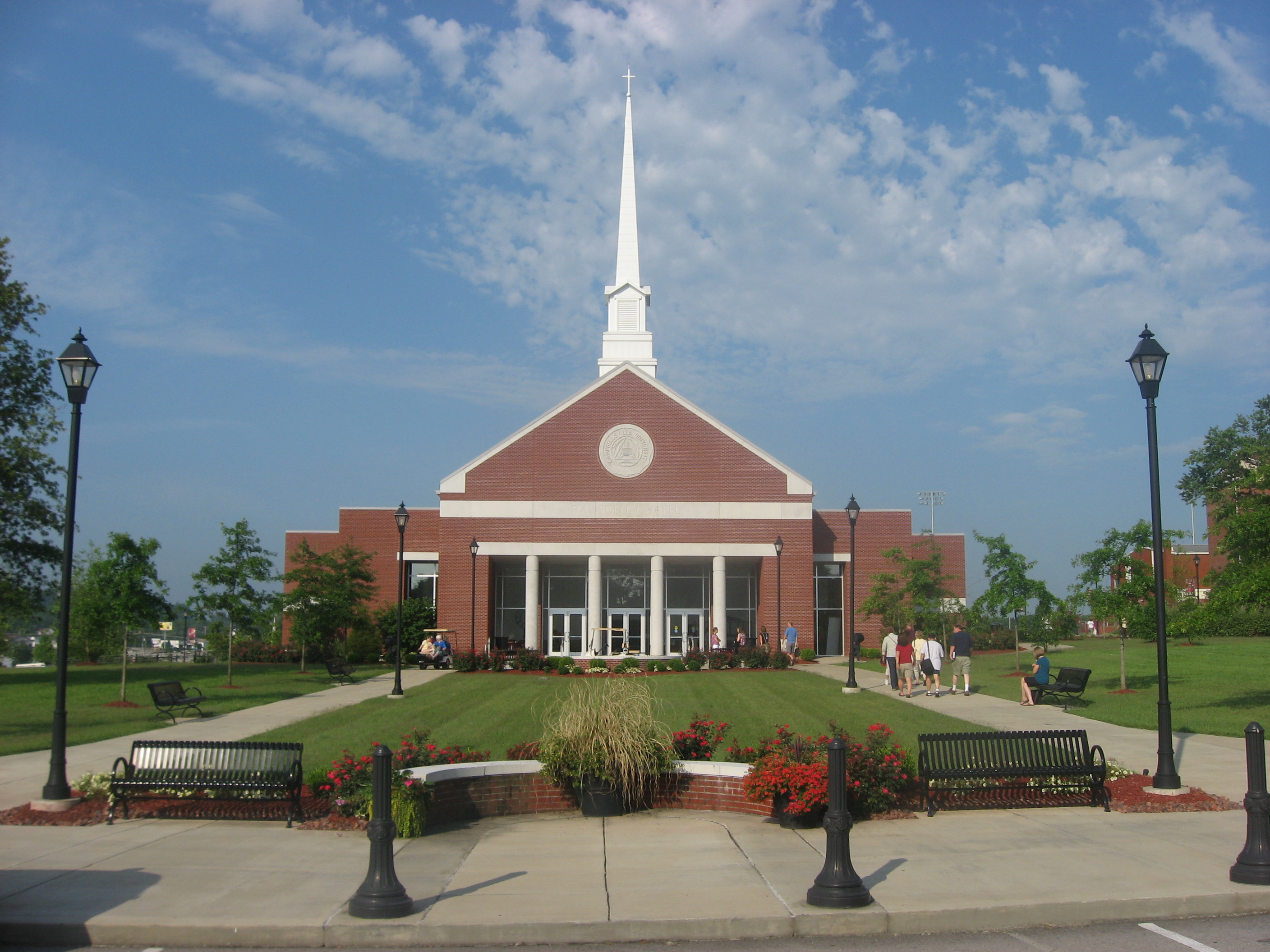
Ransdell Chapel

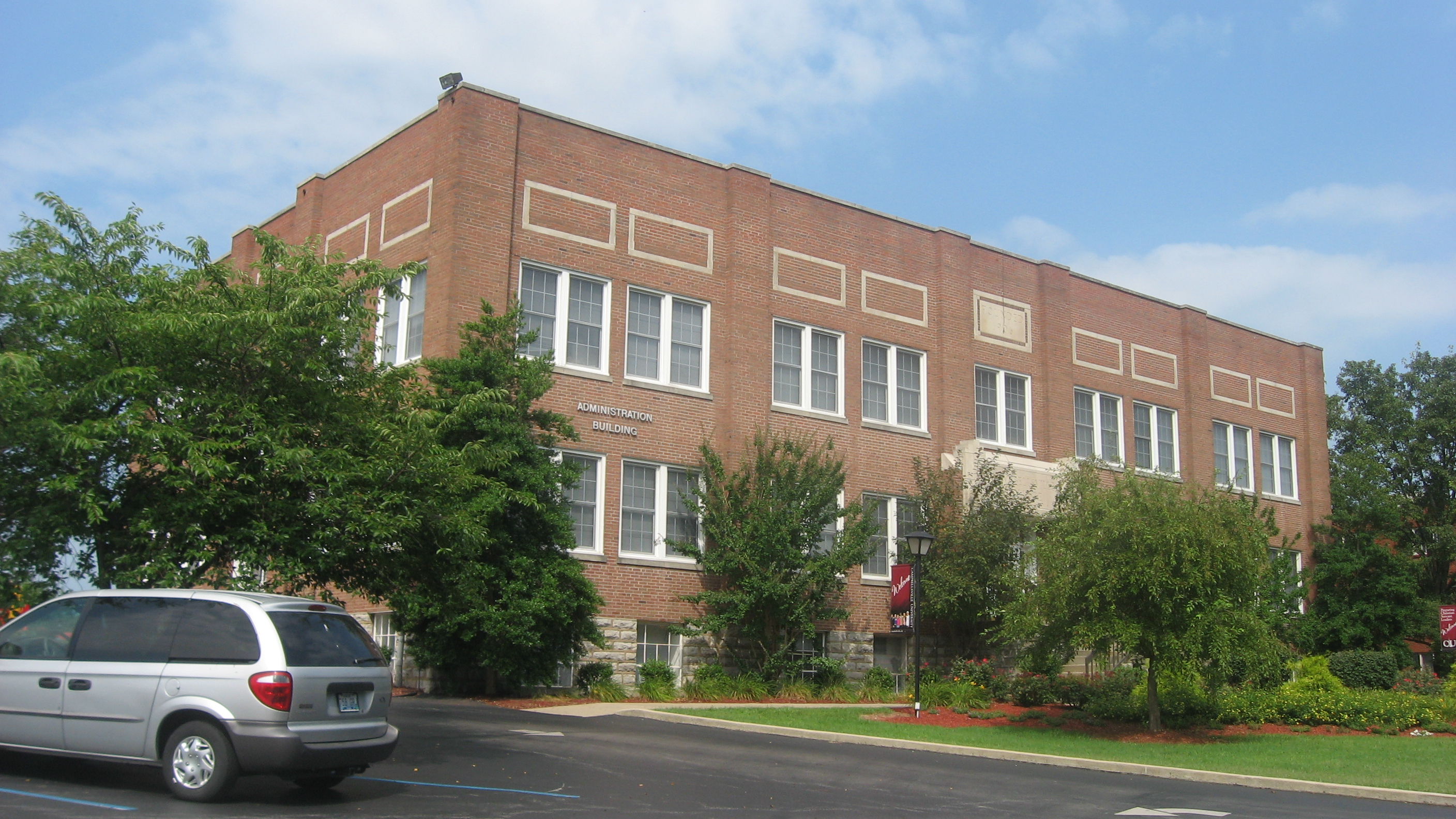
Administration Building

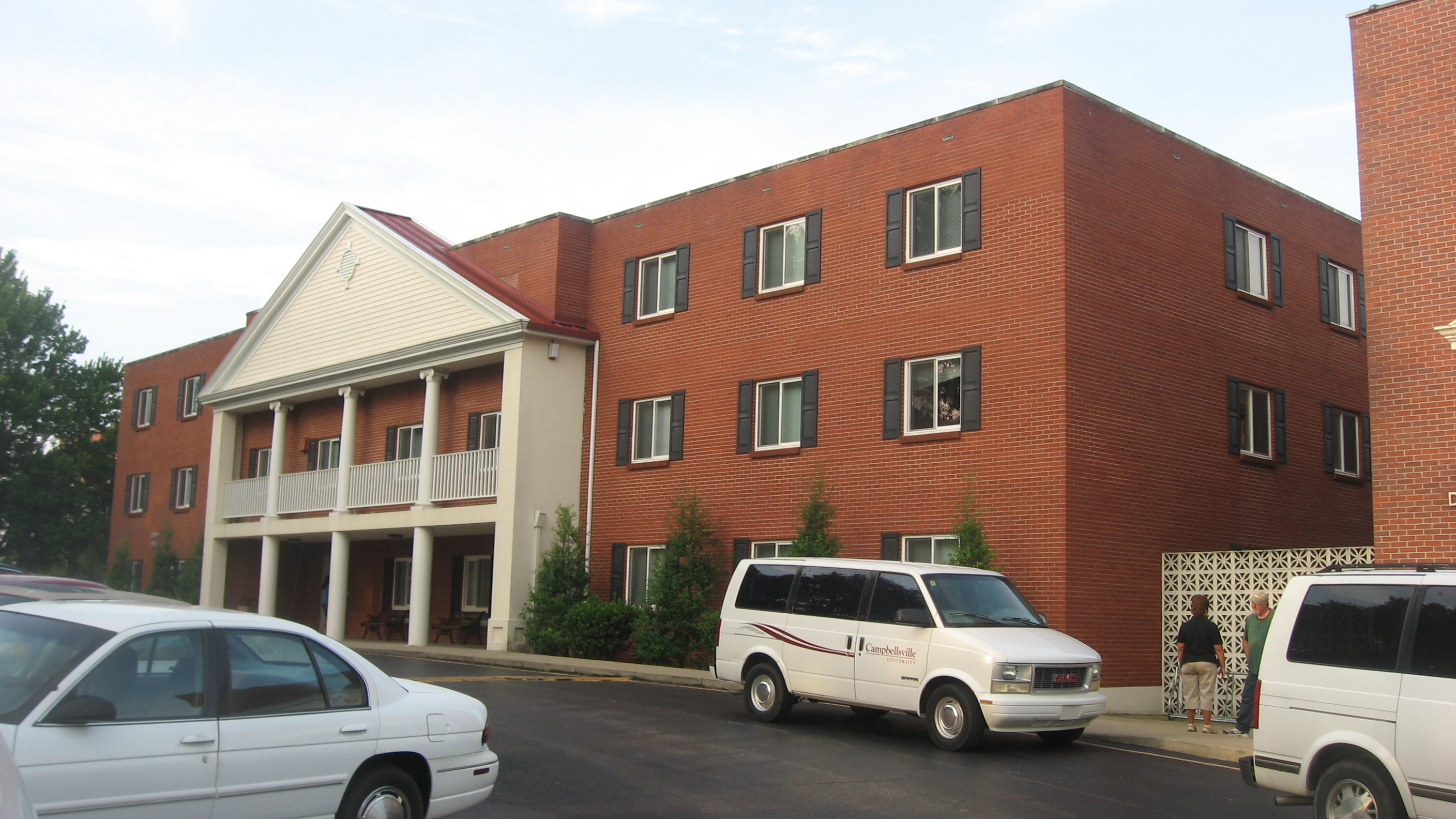
Stapp Hall

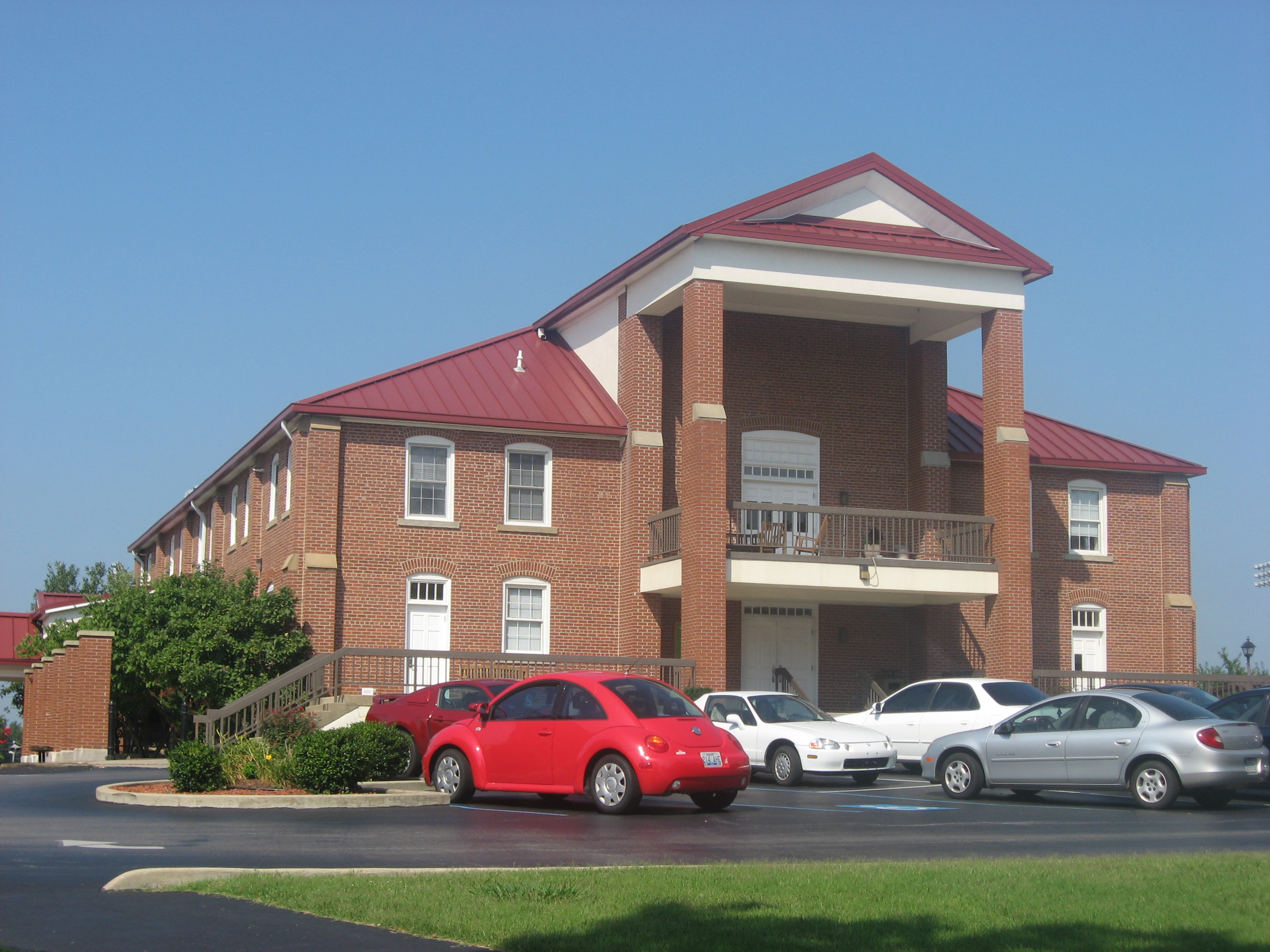
Student Activity Center

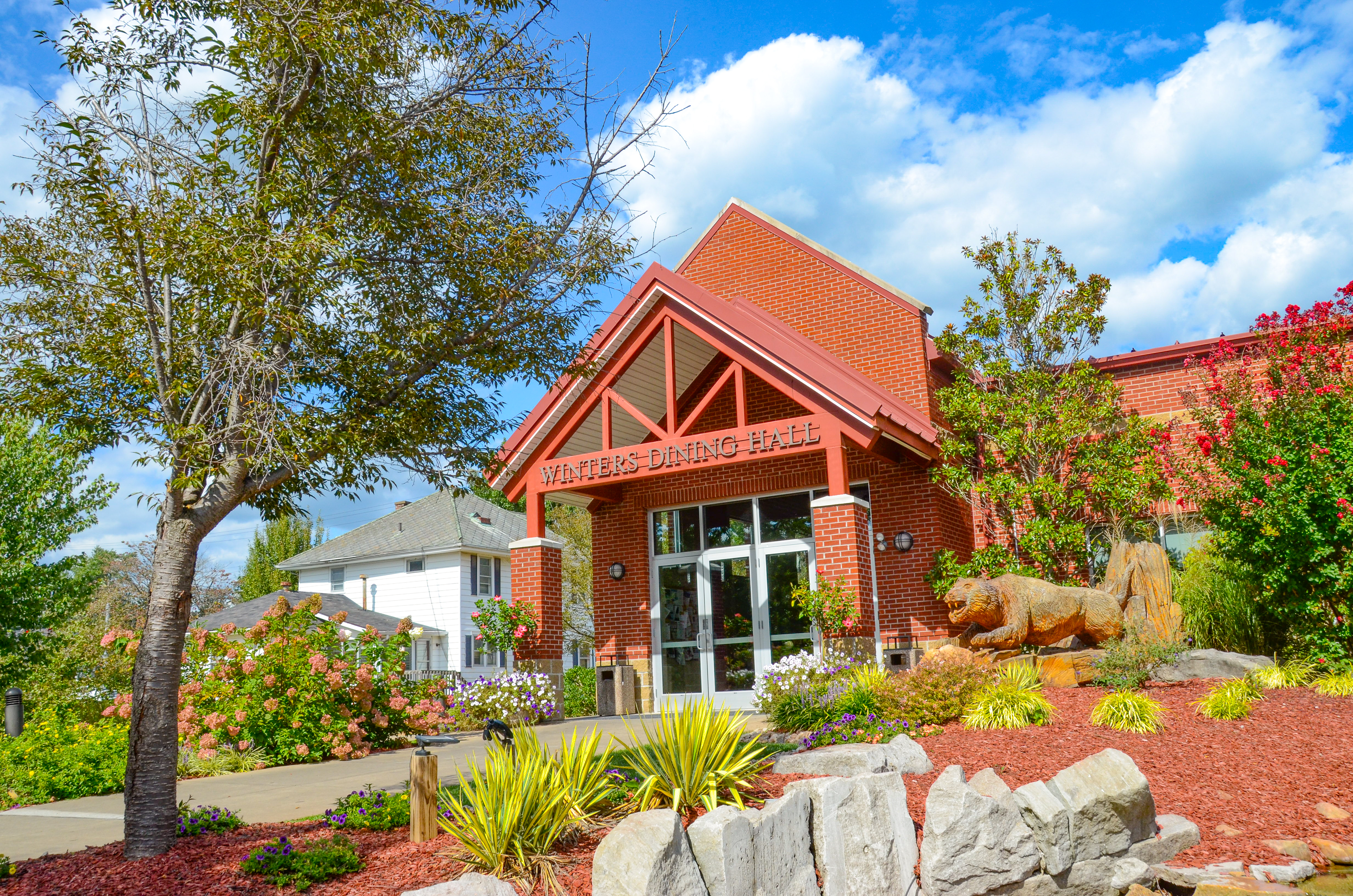
Winters Dining Hall

== Athletics ==
=== Campbellsville Tigers ===
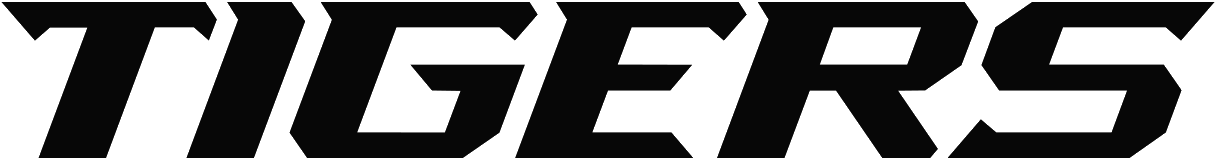
Campbellsville Tigers wordmark

The athletic teams of the Campbellsville main campus are called the Tigers. Their official colors are maroon and gray. The university is a member of the National Association of Intercollegiate Athletics (NAIA), primarily competing in the Mid-South Conference (MSC) since the 1995–96 academic year. They are also a member of the National Christian College Athletic Association (NCCAA), primarily competing as an independent in the Mid-East Region of the Division I level. The Tigers previously competed in the Kentucky Intercollegiate Athletic Conference (KIAC; known as the River States Conference (RSC) since the 2016–17 school year) from 1964–65 to 1994–95.

Campbellsville competes in 30 intercollegiate varsity sports: Men's sports include baseball, basketball, bowling, cross country, football, golf, soccer, swimming, tennis, track & field, volleyball and wrestling; while women's sports include basketball, bowling, cross country, dance, flag football, golf, soccer, softball, swimming, tennis, track & field, volleyball and wrestling; and co-ed sports include archery, bass fishing, kayak bass fishing, cheerleading and eSports.

==== Football ====
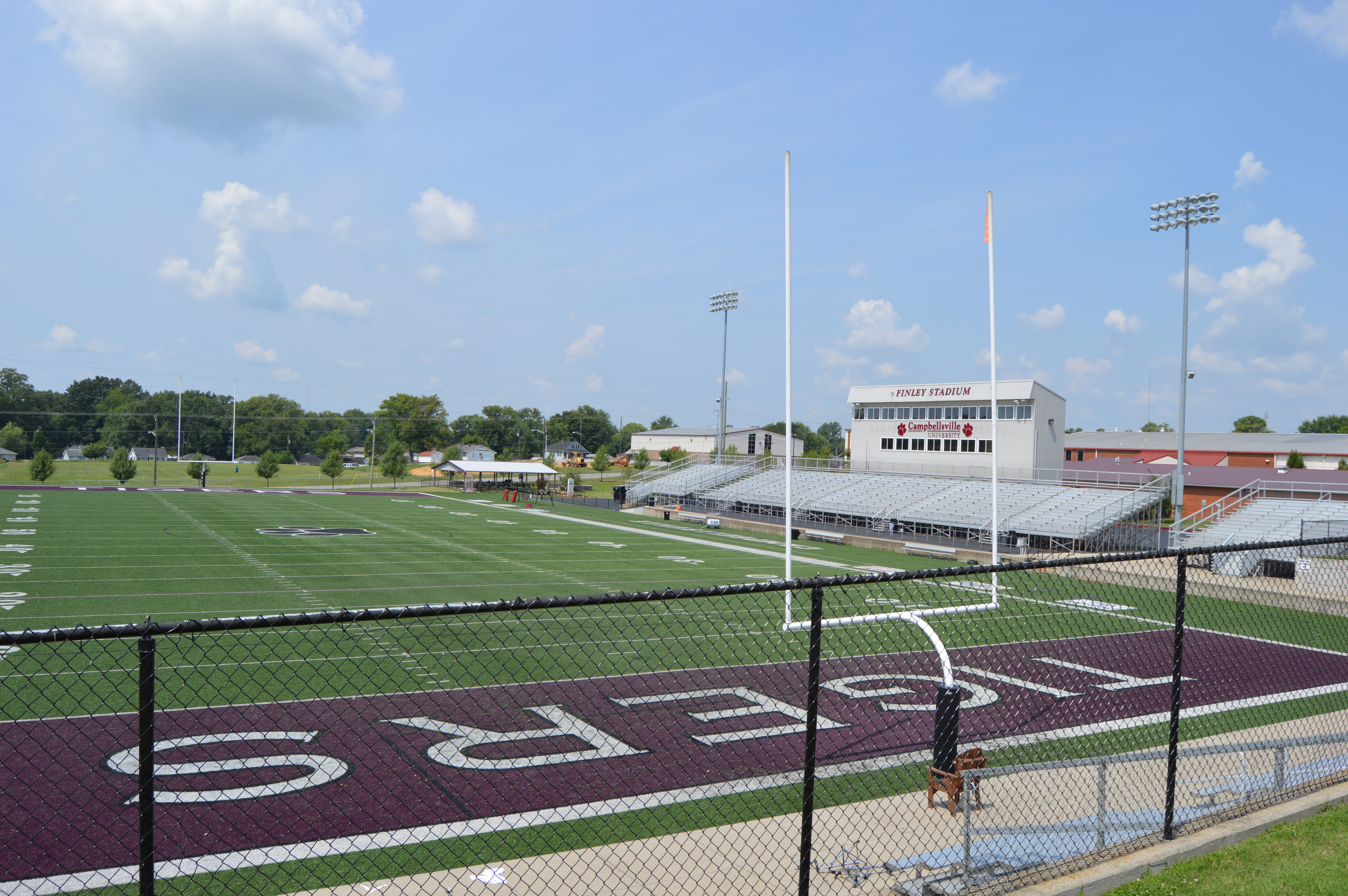
Ron Finley Stadium, football venue

The original football program was discontinued in 1937 during the Great Depression. The college revived the sport in 1987.

Shelby Osborne became the first female football player to play a non-kicking position at a four-year college after signing in summer 2014 to play cornerback at Campbellsville University.

The school's football team plays at Finley Stadium.

==== Wrestling ====
Several CU teams have received national recognition. Zack Flake, a sophomore from West Chester, Ohio, won Campbellsville's first individual national wrestling championship with his title in the 141-pound weight class in wrestling at the NAIA Wrestling National Championships in 2007.

==== Men's basketball ====
The men's basketball team has had three consecutive berths in the NAIA National Basketball tournament, reaching the National Semi-Final in 2008.

==== Women's basketball ====
The women's basketball team made their record setting 29th appearance in the NAIA National Basketball Tournament in 2018/19, after completing a sweep of the conference regular season title (undefeated), and winning the conference tournament. The Lady Tigers are coached by former Lady Tiger player and 300+ career coaching wins Ginger High Colvin.

==== Volleyball ====
In 2005, volleyball player Amy Eckenfels was recognized as the NAIA National Libero of the Year. In 2006, she set the all-time national record for career digs with 3,569. The volleyball program advanced to its first-ever NAIA National Volleyball tournament in 2007 by defeating rival Georgetown College in the finals of the Region XI qualifying tournament. Lady Tiger Volleyball advanced to the 2008 NCCAA Final Four but lost to Dallas Baptist to conclude the season with a record of 35–11. CU returned to the NCCAA Volleyball Tournament in 2009, sweeping through the field to win the school's first team national championship in Kissimmee, Florida.

==== Tennis ====
In addition, the Men's Tennis Team has won 3 NCCAA National Championships in 2012, 2015, and 2018

==== Men's basketball ====
The Pioneers men's basketball team won the 2022 NCCAA Division II National Championship by defeating Crown College.

== Notable alumni ==
- Sandra Blanton, Democratic member of the Indiana House of Representatives
- Nancy Cox, television personality in Lexington, Kentucky
- Phil Cunningham, Louisiana–Monroe head basketball coach
- E. Bruce Heilman, chancellor of the University of Richmond
- Kenneth Johnson, former WWE Manager known as “the Dr. of Style, Slick.”
- Vernie McGaha, Republican member of the Kentucky Senate
- Kayla Miracle, wrestler
- Dwane Morrison, former college basketball coach at the University of South Carolina, Mercer University and Georgia Tech
- Dallas Robinson, the state of Kentucky's sole Army Veteran and Olympian from the 2014 Olympics; Sochi Russia. Hall of fame athlete and coach.
- Rick Stansbury, basketball coach
- Simon Van Booy, author
- Randy Wayne, actor
- Wallace Wilkinson, former Governor of Kentucky
- Max Wise (born 1975), serving as a member of the Kentucky Senate
