= National Register of Historic Places listings in Taylor County, Kentucky =

Location of Taylor County in Kentucky

This is a list of the National Register of Historic Places listings in Taylor County, Kentucky.

This is intended to be a complete list of the properties and districts on the National Register of Historic Places in Taylor County, Kentucky, United States. The locations of National Register properties and districts for which the latitude and longitude coordinates are included below, may be seen in a map.

There are 14 properties and districts listed on the National Register in the county.

This National Park Service list is complete through NPS recent listings posted April 24, 2026.

== Current listings ==
	Name on the Register	Image	Date listed	Location	City or town	Description
1	Battle of Tebb's Bend Monument	Battle of Tebb's Bend Monument	July 17, 1997 (#97000668)	Romine Loop Rd., 0.5 miles north of its junction with Kentucky Route 55; 37°13′49″N 85°20′49″W	Campbellsville	
2	Battle of Tebbs Bend	Battle of Tebbs Bend	July 28, 1999 (#99000900)	Off Kentucky Route 55, Tebbs Bend Rd. 37°14′19″N 85°21′29″W	Campbellsville	
3	James Caldwell House	James Caldwell House	October 3, 2011 (#11000681)	105 Colonial Dr. 37°15′56″N 85°22′00″W	Campbellsville	
4	Campbellsville Historic Commercial District	Campbellsville Historic Commercial District	February 10, 1983 (#83002876)	Roughly bounded by Columbia Ave., Broadway, 1st, and Hotchkiss Sts., both sides of Central Ave., and railroad tracks 37°20′28″N 85°20′37″W	Campbellsville	
5	Campbellsville Residential Historic District	Campbellsville Residential Historic District	February 7, 2008 (#08000011)	Roughly bounded by Central Ave. and Duffy, Maple, and Jackson Sts. 37°20′50″N 85°20′43″W	Campbellsville	
6	Campbellsville School, Stadium and Athletic Field	Campbellsville School, Stadium and Athletic Field	January 4, 2007 (#06001195)	230 W. Main St. 37°20′15″N 85°20′55″W	Campbellsville	
7	John Chandler House	John Chandler House	January 8, 1987 (#87000184)	Off Kentucky Route 210; 37°21′52″N 85°24′03″W	Campbellsville	
8	Clay Hill	Clay Hill	October 10, 1975 (#75000835)	5 miles north of Campbellsville on Kentucky Route 55; 37°26′18″N 85°21′40″W	Campbellsville	
9	Jonathan Cowherd Jr. House	Jonathan Cowherd Jr. House	April 11, 1977 (#77000649)	West of Campbellsville off Kentucky Route 70; 37°20′20″N 85°25′22″W	Campbellsville	
10	Jacob Hiestand House	Jacob Hiestand House	February 10, 1983 (#83002877)	West of Campbellsville off Kentucky Route 210; 37°20′59″N 85°22′31″W	Campbellsville	Historic house museum in one of Kentucky's 12 German houses, built in 1823. Hit by Morgan's Raid in 1863.
11	Merchant's Hotel	Merchant's Hotel	November 25, 1980 (#80001669)	102 E. Main St. 37°20′26″N 85°20′41″W	Campbellsville	
12	Durham Sanders House	Durham Sanders House	July 31, 1996 (#96000792)	1251 Sanders Rd. 37°25′57″N 85°23′22″W	Campbellsville	No longer extant.
13	Isaac Tate Farm	Isaac Tate Farm	August 4, 2004 (#04000802)	5 miles south of Campbellsville on Kentucky Route 55; 37°15′13″N 85°21′58″W	Campbellsville	
14	Taylor County Clerk's Office	Taylor County Clerk's Office	December 20, 1977 (#77000650)	Courthouse Sq. 37°20′29″N 85°20′44″W	Campbellsville	

== See also ==
- List of National Historic Landmarks in Kentucky
- National Register of Historic Places listings in Kentucky
