= Chandler House =

Chandler House may refer to:

== Places ==
- Chandler House (Stevens Creek, Arkansas), listed on the National Register of Historic Places (NRHP) in White County
- Capt. Seth Chandler House, East Woodstock, Connecticut, NRHP-listed
- Joseph Chandler House, Centreville, Delaware, NRHP-listed
- Capt. Ebe Chandler House, Frankford, Delaware, NRHP-listed
- Asa Chandler House, Elberton, Georgia, listed on the NRHP in Elbert County
- Chandler-Linder House, Hartwell, Georgia, listed on the NRHP in Hart County
- John Chandler House, Campbellsville, Kentucky, listed on the NRHP in Taylor County
- Chandler House (Walton, Kentucky), listed on the NRHP in Boone County
- Chandler-Bigsby-Abbot House, Andover, Massachusetts, NRHP-listed
- Chandler-Hidden House, Andover, Massachusetts, NRHP-listed
- Gen. Samuel Chandler House, Lexington, Massachusetts, NRHP-listed
- Peter Chandler House, Mexico, New York, NRHP-listed
- Matthew Chandler House, Sharon Center, Ohio, listed on the NRHP in Medina County
- John W. Chandler House, Exmore, Virginia, NRHP-listed
- Walter S. Chandler House, Waukesha, Wisconsin, listed on the NRHP in Waukesha County

== Persons ==
- Chandler House (film editor) (1904–1982), editor of Las Vegas Shakedown and other films
