= List of Main Street Programs in the United States =

Main Street America's local Main Street programs aim to revitalize downtowns and commercial districts through preservation-based economic development and community revitalization. The "Main Street Project" was begun in 1977 by the National Trust for Historic Preservation with a pilot involving 3 towns: Galesburg, Illinois; Madison, Indiana; and Hot Springs, South Dakota. Based on the success in those three towns, a pilot project followed in six states: Texas, Colorado, Georgia, Massachusetts, North Carolina, and Pennsylvania.

Since then, Main Street America has expanded the program to many other towns. These may be statewide or regional "coordinating programs" or "local programs." Programs determined to be "Designated" follow best-practices established by the National Main Street Center and/or statewide or regional coordinating programs. One requirement of being a "Designated" program is to appoint a full-time staff member, often called a main street manager.

In 2020, there were 860 Nationally Accredited Main Street America programs and 44 Coordinating Programs.

== Programs ==
=== Alabama ===
- Alexander City, MainStreet Alexander City
- Anniston, Main Street Anniston
- Athens, Athens Main Street
- Birmingham, REV Birmingham
- Columbiana, Columbiana Main Street
- Decatur, Decatur Downtown Redevelopment Authority
- Dothan, Dothan Downtown Redevelopment Authority
- Elba, Main Street Elba
- Eufala, Main Street Eufaula
- Florence, Florence Main Street
- Foley, Visit Foley!
- Fort Payne, FPmainstreet
- Gadsden, Downtown Gadsden Inc.
- Heflin, Heflin Main Street
- Jasper, Jasper Main Street
- Marion, Main Street Marion
- Monroeville, Monroeville Main Street
- Montevallo, Montevallo Main Street
- Opelika, Opelika Main Street
- Oxford, Main Street Oxford
- Scottsboro, Main Street Scottsboro
- South Huntsville, South Huntsville Business Association
- Wetumpka, Main Street Wetumpka

=== Alaska ===
While there is no statewide coordinating program, there is at least one local program accredited by Main Street America.

Accredited Programs

- Juneau, Juneau Downtown Business Association. Program sought accreditation by the National Main Street Center in 2016.

=== Arizona ===
The Arizona Downtown Alliance was started in 1984 to encourage the redevelopment and improvement of downtowns in Arizona. Steven Griffin served as the President in 1984-1985. William E. Mosher, executive director of Tucson's Downtown Development Corporation was elected president in January 1987. The first ever statewide historic preservation conference, "A Sense of Place" was held June 2003 with support from the Arizona Main Street Program. Around 2008 the Main Street Program was housed under the Arizona Department of Commerce. Today Lani Lott is Coordinator of the Arizona Downtown Alliance, a program of the Arizona Preservation Foundation.

Designated programs

- Apache Junction, Apache Junction Main Street
- Buckeye, Buckeye Main Street Coalition
- Casa Grande, Casa Grande Main Street
- Florence, Florence Main Street Program
- Globe, Globe Downtown Association
- Lake Havasu City, Main Street Uptown Association
- Nogales, Nogales Community Development Corporation
- Payson, Payson Main Street Program
- Pinetop-Lakeside, Pinetop-Lakeside Main Street
- Prescott, Prescott Main Street
- Safford, Safford Downtown Association
- Sedona, Sedona Main Street Program
- Show Low, Show Low Main Street, Inc.
- Williams, Williams Main Street Association, Inc.
- Yuma, Yuma Main Street Program

Non-Designated Programs

- Douglas
- Glendale, Glendale Downtown Development Corp.
- Tucson, Tucson Downtown Development Corp.

=== Arkansas ===
- Batesville, Main Street Batesville
- Blytheville, Main Street Blytheville
- Dumas, Main Street Dumas
- El Dorado, Main Street El Dorado
- Eureka Springs, Main Street Eureka Springs
- Hardy, Main Street Hardy
- Harrison, Main Street Harrison
- Helena, Main Street Helena
- Little Rock, Southside Main Street Project
- North Little Rock, Main Street Argenta
- Osceola, Main Street Osceola
- Ozark, Main Street Ozark
- Paragould, Main Street Paragould
- Rogers, Main Street Rogers
- Russellville, Main Street Russellville
- Searcy, Main Street Searcy
- Texarkana, Main Street Texarkana
- West Memphis, Main Street West Memphis

=== California ===
California established a statewide coordinating program in 1986. From 1986 to 2002, the California Main Street Program was administered by the California Technology, Trade and Commerce Agency and supported by State General Funds. That agency was eliminated in 2002/03 due to a budget crisis. In 2004 the California Main Street Program was re-established within the Office of Historic Preservation.

Designated Programs

- Bellflower, City of Bellflower
- Benicia, Benicia Main Street
- Brentwood, Downtown Brentwood
- Cardiff-by-the-Sea, Cardiff 101 Main Street
- Carlsbad, Carlsbad Village Association
- Chico, Downtown Chico
- Coachella, City of Coachella
- Coronado, Coronado MainStreet Ltd.
- Encinitas, Encinitas 101
- Eureka, Eureka Main Street
- Fremont, City of Fremont
- Gilroy, Downtown Gilroy
- Grass Valley, Grass Valley Downtown Association
- Hanford, Main Street Hanford
- Hollister, Hollister Downtown Association
- Leucadia, Leucadia 101 Main Street
- Livermore, Livermore Downtown, Inc.
- Mariposa, Main Street Mariposa
- Martinez, Main Street Martinez, Inc.
- Oakland, Black Cultural Zone
- Ocean Beach, Ocean Beach MainStreet Association
- Oceanside, Main Street Oceanside
- Paso Robles, Paso Robles Main Street Association
- Pleasanton, Pleasanton Downtown Association
- Redding, Viva Downtown Redding
- Richmond, Richmond Main Street Initiative, Inc.
- San Luis Obispo, San Luis Obispo Downtown Association

Non-Designated Programs - may be active or inactive

- Arcata, Arcata Main Street
- Fairfield, Fairfield Downtown Association
- Lakeport, Lakeport Main Street
- Monterey, Old Monterey Business Association
- San Diego - North Park, North Park Main Street
- San Diego - Ocean Beach, Ocean Beach Main Street
- Ukiah, Ukiah Main Street Program, Inc.
- Vallejo, Vallejo Main Street
- Vista, Vista Village Business Association

=== Colorado ===
After the "Main Street Project" concluded in 1979, Colorado was one of the first six states selected for establishment of a statewide coordinating program. At the time of founding the Gates Foundation gave $100,000 to underwrite free design services in Main Street communities. Today the Colorado Department of Local Affairs serves the statewide coordinating program. In Colorado there are Designated, Candidate, Graduate, and Affiliate communities."Main Street Communities". Colorado Department of Local Affairs.

Designated Communities

- Elizabeth, Elizabeth
- Granby, Granby Area Chamber of Commerce
- Meeker, Meeker
- Montrose, Montrose
- Woodland Park, Woodland Park

Candidate Communities

- Central City, Central City
- Hugo
- La Junta
- Leadville, Leadville
- Lyons, Lyons
- Rangely
- Rifle, Rifle
- Trinidad, Trinidad

Graduate Communities

- Brush, Brush Area Chamber of Commerce
- Lake City, Lake City Downtown Improvement & Revitalization Team (DIRT)
- Lamar, Lamar
- Ridgway, Ridgway
- Steamboat Springs, Main Street Steamboat Springs
- Victor, Victor D.R.E.A.M
- Wellington, Wellington
- Windsor, Windsor

Affiliate Communities

- Aurora, Aurora Cultural Arts District
- Bennett
- Berthoud
- Buena Vista, Buena Vista
- Canon City
- Colorado Springs, Old Colorado City
- Craig
- Creede
- Eaton
- Florence
- Georgetown
- Hotchkiss
- Idaho Springs
- Mead
- Naturita
- Nederland
- Nucla
- Georgetown
- Larkspur
- Monument
- Ouray
- Sterling
- Silverton
- Walsenburg
- Westcliffe and Silver Cliff, The 'Cliffs (Westcliffe and Silver Cliff)
- Wray

=== Connecticut ===
Lisa Bumbera was coordinator for the State Program in 1995 when it was established under Connecticut Light and Power Company (CL&P). Connecticut was the first state to have its program sponsored by a private corporation rather than by the state government. The Connecticut Main Street Center was established as an independent non-profit in December 1999. The Connecticut Department of Economic Development became a Founding Partner of the program, along with CL&P. John Simone became the first full-time executive director of Connecticut Main Street in January 2000. When NU merged with Boston-based NStar in April 2012 the future of the program was cast into question. In August 2017, Patrick McMahon became Chief Executive Officer for the Connecticut Main Street Center, Inc.

- Darien, Darien Revitalization, Inc.
- Hartford - Upper Albany, Upper Albany Main Street
- New Haven, Westville Village Renaissance Alliance
- New London, New London Main Street Program
- Norwich, Rose City Renaissance
- Rockville, Rockville Downtown Association
- Simsbury, Simsbury Main Street Partnership, Inc., selected to participate in state program in 1995. Anzie O. Glover, a Simsbury resident, was selected to be the director of the Simsbury Main Street Partnership in 1996.
- Waterbury, Main Street Waterbury
- Winsted, Friends of Main Street, Common Council authorized application to Connecticut Main Street Program in 1995. The town was accepted into the program in 2001.

Non-participating Communities

- East Hartford, Town Council authorized application to Connecticut Main Street Program in 1995. Selected in 1995.
- Meriden, Bob Cooper was Meriden's downtown manager in 1996.
- New London, Selected in 1995.
- Torrington, Torrington Main Street Action Team, Selected in 1995. Shortly after being designated a public forum was held about whether to continue in the program, as they could not secure a full time director as required to participate.
- Windsor, John Simone was the first and only executive director of First Town Downtown. After three years he left to become the first full-time executive director of Connecticut Main Street in January 2000.
- Vernon, Rockville Downtown Association, Cliff Edwards was hired as manager in 2010.

=== Delaware ===
DelBiz on Main is the state Coordinating Program for Delaware, located within the Department of State, Division of Small Business.

Accredited Programs

- Dover, Downtown Dover Partnership, the Central Dover Business Association looked into the Main Street program in June 1992, at which time the City gave $20,000 towards the program.
- Milford, Downtown Milford, Inc.
- Rehoboth Beach, Rehoboth Beach Main Street, started in the mid-1990s. Won the Great American Main Street Award in 2009.
- Wilmington, Main Street Wilmington

Other Programs

- Delaware City, Main Street Delaware City, Inc.
- Middletown, Main Street Middletown
- Newark, Downtown Newark Partnership
- Wilmington - Brandywine Village, Greater Brandywine Village

=== District of Columbia ===
DC Main Streets was established in 2002 and provides services and funding to the 24 Main Street programs in the District of Columbia.

- Washington - Barracks Row, Barracks Row Main Street
- Washington - Bladensburg Road Main Street
- Washington - Chevy Chase Main Street
- Washington - Cleveland Park Main Street
- Washington - Columbia Heights/Mount Pleasant Main Streets
- Washington - Destination Congress Heights
- Washington - District Bridges Main Street
- Washington - Eastern Market Main Street
- Washington - Georgetown Main Street
- Washington - Glover Park Main Street
- Washington - Dupont Circle, Historic Dupont Circle Main Streets]
- Washington - H Street, NE H Street Main Street]
- Washington - Logan Circle Main Street
- Washington - Lower Georgia Avenue Main Street
- Washington - Minnesota Avenue Main Street
- Washington - North Capitol Main Street
- Washington - Rhode Island Avenue Main Street
- Washington - Shaw, Shaw Main Streets
- Washington - Tenleytown Main Street
- Washington - The Parks Main Street
- Washington - Uptown Main Street
- Washington - Upper Georgia Avenue Main Street
- Washington - U Street Main Street
- Washington - Van Ness Main Street
- Washington - Ward 7 Business Partnership
- Washington - Woodley Park Main Street

Non-Designated Programs

- Washington - Deanwood Heights Main Street

=== Florida ===
- Arcadia, Arcadia Main Street Program
- Auburndale, Auburndale Chamber Main Street
- Avon Park, Avon Park Main Street
- Bartow, Downtown Bartow, Inc.
- Brooksville, Florida, Brooksville Main Street
- Blountstown, Blountstown Chamber of Comm
- Clearwater, Clearwater Main Street
- Cocoa, Cocoa Main Street
- Crestview, Main Street Crestview Association
- Crystal River Main Street
- Dade City, Downtown Dade City Main Street, Inc.
- Daytona Beach, Daytona Beach Partnership
- DeLand, MainStreet DeLand Association
- East Stuart, East Stuart Main Street
- Eau Gallie Arts District
- Eustis, Eustis Main Street, Inc.
- Fernandina Beach, Florida Fernandina Beach Main Street
- Fort Myers, Downtown Management Corporation
- Fort Pierce, Fort Pierce Main Street, Inc.
- Fort Pierce - Lincoln Park, Lincoln Park Main Street
- Haines City, Haines City Main Street
- High Springs, High Springs Community Development Corporation
- Homestead, Homestead Main Street
- Jasper, Main Street Hamilton County
- Kissimmee, Kissimmee Main Street Program
- Lake Wales, Lake Wales Main Street
- Leesburg, Leesburg Partnership, Inc.
- Marianna, Marianna Main Street
- Melbourne, Downtown Melbourne Association
- Milton, Main Street Milton
- Monticello, Jefferson County Main Street
- Moore Haven, Glades County Economic
- Naples, Fifth Avenue South
- New Port Richey, Greater New Port Richey Main Street, Inc.
- Newberry, Newberry Main Street
- Okeechobee, Okeechobee Main Street, Inc.
- Orlando (Orlando Main Street Program) - Audubon Park, Audubon Park Garden District
- Orlando - College Park, Downtown College Park Partnership
- Orlando - Downtown South, Downtown South Main Street
- Orlando - Ivanhoe Village, Ivanhoe Village Main Street
- Orlando - Mills 50, Mills 50 Main Street
- Orlando - Milk District
- Ocala - Ocala Main Street
- Ormond Beach, Ormond Beach Main Street, Inc.
- Palatka, Palatka Main Street
- Palm Harbor, Old Palm Harbor Main Street
- Panama City, Panama City Main Street
- Perry, MainStreet Perry, Inc.
- Punta Gorda, Main Street Punta Gorda
- Quincy, Historic Quincy Main Street
- St. Augustine, Vilano Beach Main Street
- St. Cloud, St. Cloud Main Street Program
- St. Petersburg - 22nd Street, 22nd Street South
- St. Petersburg - Grand Central District, Grand Central District Association, Inc.
- Starke, Main Street Starke, Inc.
- Stuart, Stuart Main Street, Inc.
- Venice, Venice Main Street, Inc.
- Vero Beach, Main Street Vero Beach
- Wauchula, Main Street Wauchula, Inc.
- Winter Haven, Main Street Winter Haven, Inc.
- Zephyrhills, Main Street Zephyrhills

=== Georgia ===
After the "Main Street Project" concluded in 1979, Georgia was one of the first six states selected for establishment of a statewide coordinating program. At the time of founding the Georgia Trust for Historic Preservation raised $100,000 to provide design assistance to Main Street Communities. Today the Georgia Main Street program serves over 100 communities.

- Acworth, City of Acworth - Main Street
- Americus, Americus Downtown Development Authority - Main Street
- Athens, Athens Downtown Development Authority
- Bainbridge, City of Bainbridge Main Street
- Baxley, City of Baxley Better Hometown
- Blackshear, Blackshear BHT
- Blairsville, Blairsville Better Hometown
- Bremen, City of Bremen - Better Hometown
- Brunswick, Brunswick Main Street
- Buchanan, City of Buchanan - Better Hometown
- Byron, Byron Better Hometown
- Calhoun, Calhoun Main Street
- Carrollton, Carrollton Main Street
- Cartersville, Cartersville Main Street
- Cedartown, Downtown Cedartown Association
- Cleveland, Cleveland Better Hometown
- Cochran, Cochran Better Hometown
- College Park, City of College Park - Main Street
- Columbus, Uptown Columbus, Inc.
- Commerce, Commerce Main Street
- Conyers, Conyers Main Street Foundation
- Cordele, Cordele Main Street
- Cornelia, City of Cornelia Better Hometown
- Covington, Main Street Covington
- Dahlonega, Dahlonega Better Hometown
- Dalton, Dalton Downtown Development Authority - Main Street
- Darien, City of Darien Better Hometown
- Donalsonville, Donalsonville Better Hometown
- Douglas, Douglas Main Street Program
- Douglasville, The City of Douglasville - Main Street
- Dublin, Main Street Dublin
- Duluth, City of Duluth Main Street
- East Point, City of East Point
- Eatonton, Better Hometown - Eatonton
- Elberton, Main Street Elberton
- Ellijay, Better Hometown of Ellijay
- Fayetteville, City of Fayetteville - Main Street
- Flowery Branch, Flowery Branch Better Hometown
- Forsyth, City of Forsyth Better Hometown
- Fort Valley, Fort Valley Main Street/DDA
- Gainesville, Main Street Gainesville
- Gordon, Gordon Better Hometown
- Gray - Gray Station, Gray Station Better Hometown
- Greensboro, Greensboro Better Hometown
- Greenville, Greenville Better Hometown
- Griffin, Main Street Griffin
- Hampton, Hampton Main Street
- Hapeville, Hapeville Main Street
- Hartwell, Hartwell Downtown Development Authority - Main Street
- Hawkinsville, Hawkinsville Better Hometown
- Hazlehurst, Hazlehurst Better Hometown
- Hogansville, Hogansville Downtown Development Authority - Better Hometown
- Homerville, Homerville Better Hometown
- Jefferson, Jefferson Main Street
- LaFayette, LaFayette Main Street
- LaGrange, LaGrange Downtown Development Authority
- Lavonia, Lavonia Better Hometown
- Locust Grove, City of Locust Grove Better Hometown
- Lyons, Lyons Main Street
- Madison, Main Street - City of Madison
- Manchester, Manchester Better Hometown
- McDonough, Main Street McDonough
- Metter, Metter Better Hometown
- Milledgeville, Milledgeville Main Street
- Millen, Millen Better Hometown
- Monroe, Downtown Monroe Main Street
- Monticello, City of Monticello - Better Hometown
- Moultrie, Moultrie Main Street
- Nashville, Nashville Better Hometown, Inc.
- Newnan, Main Street Newnan
- Oglethorpe, Oglethorpe Better Hometown
- Pelham, Pelham Better Hometown
- Pembroke, City of Pembroke - Better Hometown
- Plains, Plains Better Hometown Program
- Richland, Richland Better Hometown, Inc.
- Rome, Main Street Rome
- Royston, Royston Better Hometown
- Sandersville, Main Street Sandersville
- Social Circle, Social Circle Better Hometown
- St. Marys, City of St. Marys Main Street - Downtown Development Authority
- Statesboro, Statesboro Main Street
- Stone Mountain, Main Street Stone Mountain
- Summerville, Summerville Better Hometown
- Suwanee, City of Suwanee
- Sylvania, Sylvania Better Hometown - DDA
- Tallapoosa, Tallapoosa Better Hometown
- Thomaston, Thomaston Main Street
- Thomasville, Downtown Thomasville - Main Street
- Tifton, Tifton-Tift County Main Street
- Toccoa, Main Street Toccoa
- Trenton, Trenton Better Hometown
- Union Point, Union Point Better Hometown
- Valdosta, Valdosta Main Street Program
- Vidalia, Downtown Vidalia Association - Main Street
- Vienna, Vienna Better Hometown
- Villa Rica, Villa Rica Main Street
- Warrenton, Better Hometown Warrenton, Inc.
- Washington, Washington Main Street
- Waycross, Waycross Downtown Development Authority
- Waynesboro, City of Waynesboro
- West Point, West Point Better Hometown
- Winder, Main Street Winder
- Woodbine, Woodbine Better Hometown
- Woodstock, Main Street Woodstock
- Wrens, Wrens Better Hometown
- Wrightsville, Wrightsville Better Hometown

=== Hawaii ===
No designated programs

=== Idaho ===
The statewide Main Street coordinating program was launched in June 2012 under the Idaho Department of Commerce. Jerry Miller is the state coordinator for Idaho.

Designated Programs

- Nampa, Downtown Nampa

Affiliate Programs

- Coeur d Alene, Coeur d' Alene Downtown Association
- Driggs, City of Driggs
- Lewiston, Beautiful Downtown Lewiston
- Mountain Home, City of Mountain Home

=== Illinois ===
Originally field staff with the National Trust for Historic Preservation in Chicago were instrumental in starting the "Main Street Project." One of the three original "Main Street Project" communities was in Galesburg, Illinois, from 1977-1979. Donna Ann Harris was the State Coordinator of the Illinois Main Street Program between 2000 and 2002. Presently Kelly Humrichouser is state coordinator for the Illinois Main Street program that has 19 active programs across the state.

Designated Programs

- Alton, Alton Main Street, Inc.
- Batavia, Batavia MainStreet
- Bloomington, Downtown Bloomington Association
- Carbondale, Carbondale Main Street
- Chicago - Endeleo Institute (Chicago)
- Chicago - Portage Park, Six Corners Main Street
- Columbia, Historic Main Street Columbia Association
- Crystal Lake, MainStreet Crystal Lake
- Dixon, Dixon Main Street
- Jacksonville, Jacksonville Main Street
- Libertyville, Main Street Libertyville, Inc.
- Momence, Main Street Momence
- Monticello, Monticello Main Street
- Pontiac, Pontiac PROUD
- Quincy, Historic Quincy Business District
- Silvis, Silvis Main Street
- Springfield, Downtown Springfield, Inc.
- Sterling, Sterling Main Street
- Waukegan, Waukegan Main Street

Non-designated Programs - Some may be active, others not

- Aledo, Aledo Main Street, Inc.
- Beardstown, Beardstown
- Belleville, Main Street Belleville, Inc.
- Benton, Downtown Benton, Inc.
- Berwyn, Cermak Road Revitalization Board
- Blue Island, Main Street Blue Island
- Cambridge, Cambridge Main Street
- Canton, Spoon River Partnership for Economic Development
- Champaign, Champaign Downtown Association
- Chicago - Clearing, United Business Association of Midway
- Collinsville, Downtown Collinsville
- Danville, Downtown Danville, Inc.
- Decatur, City Centre Decatur
- Du Quoin, DuQuoin Main Street
- Swight, Dwight Main Street
- Eldorado, Main Street Eldorado, Inc.
- Elgin, Downtown Neighborhood
- Galesburg, Galesburg Downtown Council. The Galesburg Downtown Council was formed in the fall of 1972 after plans were announced for a new shopping center, the Sandburg Mall. A few years later when Galesburg was selected for the "Main Street Project" in 1977 it made front page news just below the Galesburg Register-Mail masthead. In the article, Robert Carter with the National Trust for Historic Preservation commented "One of the problems we face in this type of work has never been done before."
- Genoa, Genoa Main Street, Inc.
- Golconda, Main Street Golconda
- Hardin County, Hardin County Main Street
- Harvard, Harvard Main Street
- Hoopeston, Visioning for the Future
- Jacksonville, Jacksonville Main Street
- Libertyville, Main Street Libertyville, Inc.
- Lincoln, Main Street Lincoln
- Lombard, Lombard Town Centre
- Macomb, Macomb Downtown Development Corporation
- Marengo, Marengo Main Street
- Marion, Marion Main Street
- Marshall, Main Street Marshall
- Mascoutah, Main Street Mascoutah
- Mendota, Mendota
- Momence, Main Street Momence
- Monticello, Monticello Main Street
- Mt. Vernon, Downtown Mt. Vernon Development Corporation
- Mundelein, Mundelein Main Street
- Murphysboro, Murphysboro Main Street
- O'Fallon, Main Street O`Fallon
- Orion, Main Street Orion
- Paris, Main Street Paris
- Paxton, P.R.I.D.E. in Paxton, Inc.
- Pekin, Pekin Main Street
- Pittsfield, Pittsfield Main Street
- Plainfield, MainStreet Plainfield, Inc.
- Pontiac, Pontiac PROUD
- Princeton, Main Street Princeton
- Prophetstown, Prophetstown Main Street Program
- Quincy, Historic Quincy Business District
- Rock Island, Downtown Rock Island Arts & Entertainment
- Rockford, River District Association
- Rushville, Rushville Main Street
- St. Charles, Downtown St. Charles Partnership
- Taylorville, Taylorville Main Street, Inc.
- Vandalia, Vandalia Main Street Program
- Winfield, Main Street Winfield, Inc.
- Woodstock, Woodstock Downtown Business Association

=== Indiana ===
- Alexandria, Alexandria Community Vision, ACV
- Anderson, Anderson Indiana Main Street
- Arcadia, Arcadia Merchants & Associates dba Arcadia Communi
- Atlanta, Town of Atlanta
- Attica, Attica Main Street
- Aurora, Main Street Aurora
- Bedford, Bedford Revitalization, Inc.
- Berne, Berne Community Development Corporation
- Bloomington, Downtown Bloomington, Inc.
- Bremen, Bremen Revitalization
- Brookville, Brookville Main Street, Inc.
- Cloverdale, Cloverdale Main Street
- Corydon, Main Street Corydon
- Crawfordsville, Crawfordsville Main Street
- Delphi, Delphi Main Street Association
- Elkhart, Downtown Elkhart, Inc.
- Ellettsville, Ellettsville Main Street, Inc.
- Evansville, Growth Alliance for Greater Evansville
- Farmland, Historic Farmland USA
- Ferdinand, Ferdinand Merchants/Ferdinand Tourism
- Frankfort, Frankfort Main Street
- Franklin, Discover Downtown Franklin
- Greenfield, Greenfield/Hancock County Chamber of Commerce
- Greensburg, Heart of the Tree City
- Greentown, Greentown Main Street Association, Inc.
- Greenwood, Restore Old Town Greenwood INC.
- Indianapolis, Indianapolis Downtown, Inc.
- Jasper, Jasper Chamber of Commerce
- Jeffersonville, Jeffersonville Main Street, Inc.
- Kokomo, Kokomo Downtown Association
- Lafayette, Greater Lafayette Commerce
- Lawrenceburg, Lawrenceburg Main Street, Inc.
- Lebanon, Lebanon Vitalization, Inc.
- Logansport, Logan's Landing Association
- Madison, Madison Main Street Program, First hosted a visit of Lockwood Martling from the U.S. Department of Housing and Urban Development in 1970. Later became one of three original "Main Street Project" communities in the US, run by Historic Madison, Inc. first founded in 1960. Madison was one of 10 semifinalists for the "Main Street Project" in 1977 and ultimately selected. Tom Moriarity, director of Historic Madison, Inc. worked for the National Trust for Historic Preservation between 1977 and 1979 as part of the "Main Street Project."
- Marion, Main Street Marion
- Martinsville, Rediscover Historic Martinsville
- Michigan City, Michigan City Main Street Association
- Mitchell, Mitchell on the Move
- Morocco, Morocco Main Street, Inc.
- Morristown, Morristown Visionary Committee, Inc.
- Muncie, Muncie Downtown Development Partnership
- Nappanee, Nappanee Main & Market
- New Albany, Develop New Albany, Inc.
- New Harmony, New Harmony Business Associates
- Newburgh, Historic Newburgh, Inc.
- Noblesville, Noblesville Main Street, Inc.
- Peru, Miami County Chamber of Commerce
- Plainfield, Town of Plainfield
- Plymouth, Plymouth Main Street
- Remington and Wolcott, Remington Wolcott Community Development Corp
- Rensselaer, Main Street Rensselaer
- Richmond, Main Street Richmond
- Rising Sun, Historic Downtown
- Rushville, The Heart of Rushville, Inc.
- Seymour, Seymour Main Street
- Shelbyville, Mainstreet Shelbyville, Inc.
- Sheridan, Sheridan Main Street
- Terre Haute, Downtown Terre Haute, Inc.
- Upland, Our Town Upland, Inc.
- Valparaiso, Valparaiso Community
- Vevay, Vevay Main Street, Inc.
- Wabash, Wabash Marketplace, Inc.
- Wakarusa, Town of Wakarusa
- Walton, Walton Main Street Organization Corp.
- Warsaw, Warsaw Community Development
- Winchester, Winchester Main Street

=== Iowa ===
- Ames, Ames Main Street
- Avoca, Avoca Main Street
- Belle Plaine, Belle Plaine Community Development Corp
- Bloomfield, Bloomfield Main Street
- Burlington, Downtown Partners, Inc.
- Cedar Falls, Cedar Falls Community Main Street
- Cedar Rapids, Czech Village-New Bohemia
- Centerville, Main street Centerville
- Central City, Central City Main street
- Chariton, Chariton Area Chamber of Commerce/ Main Street
- Charles City, Charles City Community Revitalization
- Clarence, Clarence Main Street
- Colfax, Colfax Main Street
- Conrad, Conrad Chamber-Main Street
- Coon Rapids, Main Street Coon Rapids
- Corning, Main Street Corning
- Davenport, Hilltop Campus Village Main Street
- Des Moines, 6th Avenue Corridor
- Dubuque, Dubuque Main Street
- Dunlap, Dunlap Community Development Corporation
- Elkader, Main Street Elkader
- Fort Dodge, Fort Dodge Main Street
- Greenfield, Greenfield Chamber-Main Street
- Grundy Center, Main Street Grundy Center
- Guthrie Center, Main Street Guthrie Center
- Hampton, Main Street Hampton
- Iowa Falls, Iowa Falls Chamber Main Street
- Jefferson, Jefferson Matters: A Main Street & Chamber Community
- Jewell, Jewell Main Street
- Keokuk, Main Street Keokuk, Inc.
- Lansing, Main Street Lansing
- Le Mars, Main Street Le Mars
- Marcus, Marcus Main Street
- Marshalltown, Marshalltown CBD/Main Street
- Mason City, Mason City Downtown Association
- Mount Pleasant, Main Street Mount Pleasant
- Mount Vernon, Mount Vernon Community Development
- Nevada, Main Street Nevada
- Newton, Newton Main Street
- New Hampton, New Hampton Main Street
- Osceola, Osceola Chamber-Main Street
- Oskaloosa, Main Street Oskaloosa
- Ottumwa, Ottumwa Progress/Main Street Ottumwa
- Sac City, Sac City Chamber-Main Street
- Spencer, Spencer Main Street Company
- State Center, State Center Development Association
- Story City, Story City Greater Chamber Connection
- Washington, Main Street Washington
- Waterloo, Main Street Waterloo
- Waverly, Waverly Area Development Group
- West Branch, Main Street West Branch
- West Des Moines, Historic Valley Junction Foundation
- West Union, Main Street West Union
- Woodbine, Woodbine Main Street

=== Kansas ===
- Augusta, Downtown Augusta, Inc.
- Belleville, Belleville Main Street
- Chanute, Main Street Chanute, Inc.
- Coffeyville, Downtown Coffeyville, Inc.
- El Dorado, El Dorado Main Street
- Emporia, Emporia Main Street
- Garden City, Garden City Downtown Vision
- Hoisington, Hoisington Main Street, Inc.
- Holton, Holton Main Street
- Hutchinson, The Downtown Hutchinson Revitalization Partnership
- Independence, Independence Main Street
- Leavenworth, Leavenworth Main Street Program, Inc.
- Manhattan, Downtown Manhattan, Inc.
- Marysville, Marysville Main Street
- McPherson, McPherson Main Street
- Ottawa, Ottawa Main Street
- Parsons, Downtown Parsons, Inc., a team from the Kansas Department of Economic Development Main Street Program visited in May 1986. They met with "Mainstreet PRIDE" Board of Directors.
- Peabody, Peabody Main Street Association
- Phillipsburg, Discover Phillipsburg Main Street
- Russell, Russell Main Street
- Seneca, Seneca Downtown Impact, Inc.
- Stafford, Stafford Main Street
- Sterling, Main Street Sterling
- Wamego, Wamego Main Street
- Winfield, Winfield Main Street

=== Kentucky ===
- Barbourville, Barbourville Main Street
- Bardstown, Bardstown Main Street Program
- Bellevue, City of Bellevue
- Cadiz, Cadiz Main Street
- Campbellsville, Main Street Program
- Carrollton, Carrollton Main Street
- Covington, Renaissance Covington
- Cumberland, Tri-Cities Heritage Development Corporation
- Cynthiana, Cynthiana Main Street
- Danville, Heart of Danville, Inc.
- Dawson Springs, Dawson Springs Main
- Dayton, Dayton Main Street
- Frankfort, Downtown Frankfort, Inc.
- Georgetown, Georgetown Main Street
- Guthrie, Kentucky Guthrie, Guthrie Main Street
- Harrodsburg, Harrodsburg First, Inc.
- Henderson, Downtown Henderson Project
- La Grange, Discover Downtown La Grange
- Lebanon, Lebanon/Marion Main Street
- London, London Downtown
- Marion, Marion Main Street
- Maysville, Maysville Main Street
- Middlesboro, Discover Downtown Middlesboro, Inc.
- Morehead, Downtown Morehead Inc
- Mt. Washington, Kentucky Mt. Washington Mt. Washington Main Street
- Murray, Murray Main Street
- New Castle, New Castle Main Street
- Nicholasville, Nicholasville Now
- Paducah, Paducah Main Street
- Paintsville, Paintsville Main Street
- Paris, Paris Main Street
- Perryville, Perryville Main Street
- Pikeville, Pikeville Main Street
- Pineville, Pineville Main Street
- Princeton, Princeton Main Street
- Russellville, Main Street Russellville, Inc.
- Salyersville, Salyersville Main Street
- Scottsville, Heart of Scottsville
- Shelbyville, Shelby Main Street
- Springfield, Springfield Main Street
- Taylorsville, Taylorsville Main Street
- Wayland, Kentucky Wayland, Wayland Main Street
- Williamsburg, Williamsburg Main Street
- Winchester, Winchester Main Street

=== Louisiana ===
The Louisiana Main Street Program is within the Office of Cultural Development and the Division of Historic Preservation. Established in 1984, there are presently 24 designated Main Street Programs in Louisiana.

Designated Programs

- Abbeville, Abbeville Main Street
- Bastrop, Bastrop Main Street
- Columbia, Main Street Columbia
- Crowley, Crowley Main Street
- Denham Springs, Denham Springs Main Street
- DeRidder, DeRidder Main Street
- Donaldsonville, Donaldsonville Downtown Development District
- Eunice, Eunice Main Street
- Franklin, Franklin Main Street
- Hammond, Hammond Downtown Dev District
- Homer, Main Street Homer
- Houma, Houma Downtown Development Corporation
- Kenner, Rivertown Main Street
- Leesville, Leesville Main Street
- Minden, Minden Main Street
- Monroe, Downtown Monroe Alliance
- Morgan City, Morgan City Main Street
- Natchitoches, Natchitoches Main Street
- New Iberia, New Iberia Main Street
- New Orleans - Broad Street, Broad Community Connections
- New Orleans - North Rampart Street, North Rampart Main Street, Inc.
- New Orleans - O.C. Haley Boulevard, O.C. Haley Main Street
- New Orleans - Old Algiers, Old Algiers Main Street Corporation
- New Roads, New Roads Main Street
- Opelousas, Main Street Opelousas
- Plaquemine, Plaquemine Main Street
- Ponchatoula, Ponchatoula Main Street
- Ruston, City of Ruston Main Street
- Slidell, St. Tammany Chamber of Commerce, Olde Towne Slidell Main Street
- Springhill, Springhill Main Street Program
- St. Francisville, St. Francisville Main Street
- St. Martinville, St. Martinville Main Street
- Thibodaux, Thibodaux Main Street
- Winnsboro, Winnsboro Main Street

Non-Designated Programs

- Bogalusa, Bogalusa Downtown Development
- Clinton, Clinton Main Street Association
- New Orleans - Oak Street, Oak Street Association
- New Orleans - St. Claude Avenue, St. Claude Main Street

=== Maine ===
The Maine Development Foundation serves as the coordinating program for Maine. In August 2018, Main Street Maine communities launched a website to share authentic Maine downtown experiences, featuring businesses and attractions in each city and town with the National Main Street designation.

Main Street Maine Communities

- Augusta, Augusta Downtown Alliance
- Bath, Main Street Bath
- Belfast, Our Town Belfast
- Biddeford, Heart of Biddeford
- Brunswick, Brunswick Downtown Association
- Gardiner, Gardiner Main Street
- Rockland, Rockland Main Street
- Saco, Saco Main Street
- Skowhegan, Main Street Skowhegan
- Westbrook, Discover Downtown Westbrook

Maine Downtown Affiliates

- Eastport, Eastport for Pride
- Norway, Norway Downtown Revitalization

=== Maryland ===
- Aberdeen, City of Aberdeen
- Annapolis, City of Annapolis
- Baltimore - Belair-Edison, Belair-Edison Main Street
- Baltimore - Brooklyn, Brooklyn Main Street
- Baltimore - Federal Hill, Federal Hill Main Street
- Baltimore - Fells Point, Fells Point Development Corporation
- Baltimore - Govanstowne, Govanstowne Business Association
- Baltimore - Hamilton-Lauraville, Hamilton-Lauraville Main Street
- Baltimore - Highlandtown, Highlandtown Main Street Program
- Baltimore - East Monument Street, Historic East Monument Street
- Baltimore - Pennsylvania Avenue, Pennsylvania Avenue
- Baltimore - Washington Village, Pigtown Main Street
- Baltimore - Waverly, Waverly Main Street
- Bel Air, Bel Air Downtown Alliance
- Berlin, Town of Berlin
- Brunswick, Brunswick Main Street, Inc.
- Cambridge, Cambridge Main Street
- Chestertown, Downtown Chestertown Association
- Cumberland, Cumberland Downtown
- Denton, Town of Denton
- Dundalk, Dundalk Renaissance Corporation
- Easton, Easton Main Street
- Elkton, Elkton Chamber and Alliance
- Frederick, Downtown Frederick Partnership
- Frostburg, Frostburg Main Street
- Havre de Grace, Havre de Grace Main Street, Inc.
- Middletown, Town of Middletown
- Mount Airy, Mount Airy Main Street Association
- Oakland, Oakland Main Street
- Princess Anne, Downtown Princess Anne Partnership
- Sykesville, Downtown Sykesville Connection
- Salisbury, Urban Salisbury, Inc.
- Takoma Park, Old Takoma Business Association
- Taneytown, Taneytown Main Street Program
- Thurmont, Thurmont Main Street
- Westminster, The City of Westminster

=== Massachusetts ===
After the "Main Street Project" concluded in 1979, Massachusetts was one of the first six states selected for establishment of a statewide coordinating program. At the time of founding banking industry leaders held two conferences to discuss innovative financing programs. Under the leadership of then Boston Mayor Thomas Menino, a citywide coordinating program was established in Boston. This has since grown to include 22 designated Main Street programs in Boston.

- Allston, Allston Village Main Streets
- Boston - Chinatown, Chinatown Main Street
- Boston - Mission Hill, Mission Hill Main Streets
- Boston - Washington Gateway, Washington Gateway Main Street
- Brighton, Brighton Main Streets
- Dorchester - Bowdoin/Geneva Main Streets
- Dorchester - Fields Corner Main Street
- Dorchester - Greater Ashmont Main Street
- Dorchester - Four Corners Main Street
- Dorchester - Grove Hall Main Street
- Dorchester - St. Mark's, St. Mark's Area Main Street
- Dorchester - Uphams Corner/Dorchester Bay, Upham's Corner Main Street
- East Boston, East Boston Gateway, Inc.
- Hyde Park, Hyde Park Main Street, Inc.
- Jamaica Plain - Centre/South, Centre/South Main Streets
- Jamaica Plain - Hyde/Jackson Square, Hyde/Jackson Square Main Streets
- Roslindale, Roslindale Village Main Street
- Roxbury - Nubian Square (formerly Dudley Square), Dudley Square Main Street
- Roxbury - Egleston Square, Egleston Square Main Street
- West Roxbury, West Roxbury Main Streets
- Somerville, East Somerville Main Streets
- Somerville, Union Square Main Streets

=== Michigan ===
- Boyne City, Boyne City Main Street Program
- Calumet, Main Street Calumet
- Clare, City of Clare
- Detroit - Corktown's Michigan Avenue Business District, Greater Corktown Development Corporation
- Detroit - East Warren Businesses United U-SNAP-BAC, Inc.
- Detroit - Grandmont Rosedale Business District, Grandmont/Rosedale Development Corporation
- Detroit - Jefferson East Business District, Jefferson East Business Association
- Detroit - Mexicantown, Mexicantown Hubbard
- Detroit - Seven Mile, Arab-American & Chaldean Council
- Detroit - Southeast Gratiot Avenue Business District, Gratiot McDougall United CDC
- Detroit - University Commons Business District, University Commons District
- Farmington, Farmington DDA
- Ferndale, Ferndale DDA
- Franklin, Village of Franklin
- Grand Haven, Grand Haven Main Street
- Hart, Hart Main Street
- Highland Township - Highland Station, Highland Township DDA
- Holly, Village of Holly DDA
- Howell, Howell Main Street Project
- Iron Mountain, Iron Mountain Main Street
- Ishpeming, Ishpeming Main Street Program
- Keego Harbor, City of Keego Harbor
- Lake Orion, Village of Lake Orion DDA
- Lansing, Downtown Lansing
- Lansing, Old Town Lansing
- Manistee, Manistee Main Street/DDA
- Marshall, Marshall Main Street. When the National Trust for Historic Preservation was developing a program for downtown revitalization in the 1970s, Marshall is one of three towns frequently cited as a success story.
- Midland, Midland Downtown Development
- Muskegon, Muskegon Main Street
- Niles, Niles DDA Main Street Program
- Ortonville, Ortonville DDA
- Oxford, Oxford DDA
- Pontiac, City of Pontiac DDA
- Portland, Main Street Portland
- Rochester, Rochester DDA
- Scottville, Scottville Main Street
- Walled Lake, Walled Lake DDA

=== Minnesota ===
A unique approach has been taken in Minnesota to rebrand the Preservation Alliance of Minnesota as "Rethos" - a 501c3 non-profit that works with Main Street communities but also neighborhood groups, developers, and homeowners.

Designated Communities

- Albert Lea
- Faribault, Faribault Main Street, since 2013
- Mankato, City Center Mankato, eighth designated community in November 2017
- Northfield
- Olivia
- Owatonna
- Red Wing, Red Wing Downtown Main Street
- Shakopee
- Wabasha
- Willmar, Willmar Design Center
- Winona, in June 1974 a workshop "Heritage is a Verb: a Public Workshop on Historic Preservation" featured Mary Means, field staff, National Trust for Historic Preservation. Following the workshop a tour of the Latsch Building with the committee to Save Historic Winona occurred.

Network Communities

- Bird Island
- Braham
- Jackson
- Lanesboro
- Litchfield
- Luverne
- Sauk Centre
- Sleepy Eye, Sleepy Eye Economic Development Authority

Other Communities

- Brainerd, Brainerd Main Street
- New Ulm

=== Mississippi ===
The Mississippi Main Street Association was established in 1984 as a 501(c)(3) non-profit organization headquartered in Jackson, Mississippi. Mississippi Main Street serves as the coordinating program for 48 designated Main Street programs in Mississippi. Thomas Gregory currently serves as the executive director and state coordinator for the Mississippi Main Street Association. Previous state coordinators include Bob Wilson, Beverly Meng, Stacy Pair and Scott Barksdale. Below is a list of Mississippi's designated Main Street programs.

- Aberdeen, Aberdeen Main Street
- Amory, Amory Main Street, Inc.
- Baldwyn, Baldwyn Main Street Association
- Batesville, Batesville Main Street Program
- Biloxi, Biloxi Main Street
- Booneville, Booneville Main Street Association
- Byhalia, Byhalia Area Chamber Main Street
- Cleveland, Team Cleveland Main Street
- Clinton, Main Street Clinton
- Columbia, Columbia Main Street, Inc.
- Columbus, Columbus Main Street, Inc.
- Corinth, Main Street Corinth
- Crystal Springs, Main Street Crystal Springs
- Greenville, Main Street Greenville
- Greenwood, Main Street Greenwood, Inc.
- Gulfport, Gulfport Main Street Association
- Hattiesburg, Downtown Hattiesburg Association
- Hernando, Hernando Main Street Chamber
- Holly Springs, Holly Springs Main Street
- Indianola, Indianola Main Street Chamber
- Itawamba County, Itawamba County Main Street
- Kosciusko, Kosciusko Main Street
- Laurel, Laurel Main Street
- Leake County, Leake County Main Street Chamber
- Louisville, Louisville Main Street
- Meridian, Meridian Main Street
- Moss Point, Moss Point Main Street Association
- Natchez, Downtown Natchez Alliance
- Nettleton, Nettleton Main Street
- New Albany, New Albany Main Street
- Ocean Springs, Ocean Springs Main Street
- Okolona, Okolona Main Street Chamber
- Pascagoula, Main Street Pascagoula
- Pearl, Main Street Pearl
- Philadelphia, Philadelphia Main Street Association
- Picayune, Picayune Main Street
- Pontotoc County, Pontotoc County Main Street
- Ripley, Ripley Main Street Association
- Saltillo, Saltillo Main Street
- Senatobia, Senatobia Main Street Partnership
- Starkville, Starkville Main Street
- Sumrall, Sumrall Main Street
- Tunica, Tunica Main Street, Inc.
- Tupelo, Downtown Tupelo Main Street Association
- Vicksburg, Vicksburg Main Street
- Water Valley, Water Valley Main Street
- West Point, West Point Main Street
- Woodville, Woodville/Wilkinson County Main Street

=== Missouri ===
Missouri has over 160 commercial districts participating in Missouri Main Street. A state-wide non-profit organization was formed in 2004 and recognizes communities in the following categories: Accredited, Associate, Affiliate, and Aspiring. There are 7 accredited communities with the highest level of designation. Gayla Roten has been State Director since November 2007. She is assisted in that role by a staff of six.

Accredited Communities

- Cape Girardeau, Old Town Cape, Inc.
- Chillicothe, Main Street Chillicothe
- Excelsior Springs, Downtown Excelsior Partnership, Inc.
- Lee's Summit, Downtown Lee's Summit, Inc.
- Liberty, Historic Downtown Liberty
- Warrensburg, Warrensburg Main Street
- Washington, Downtown Washington, Inc.

Associate Communities

- Blue Springs
- Clinton, Clinton Main Street, Inc.
- Independence
- Joplin

Affiliate Communities

- Albany
- Ashland
- Belton
- Brookfield
- Brunswick
- Butler
- Cameron
- Campbell
- Canton
- Carthage
- Concordia
- Dutchtown
- Fayette
- Festus
- Glasgow, Glasgow Main Street
- Grandview
- Harrisonville
- Jackson
- Kearney
- Kirksville
- Knob Noster
- Lebanon
- Marceline
- Maryville
- Moberly
- Monroe City
- Nixa
- Odessa
- Ozark, Ozark Main Street Program
- Pacific
- Parkville
- Pleasant Hill
- Sikeston, Historic Midtown Development Group Inc
- Smithville
- Sparta
- St. Joseph. In 1974 Mary Means then serving as field services for the National Trust for Historic Preservation spoke to a group at the Chamber of Commerce in St. Joseph. This was among the earliest times a suggestion was made to revitalize a commercial area using preservation as a tool. The warehouse area on 4th Street, Francis to Jule St, was recommended "as a possible historical shopping area ripe for development."
- Trenton
- Warrenton
- Willow Springs

Other Communities

- Louisiana, Louisiana Economic Development Committee
- Nevada, Main Street Nevada
- Warsaw, Warsaw Main Street, Inc.
- West Plains, Downtown West Plains

=== Montana ===
Montana Main Street Program was established in 2005 as a collaborative effort between the Community Development Division and the Montana Office of Tourism at the Department of Commerce. Three pilot projects for the program were selected in 2006: Anaconda, Polson, and Red Lodge. Joining them a few years later were Libby, STevensville, Butte, and Livingston to bring the total up to seven. In 2013 Governor Steve Bullock brought together the Community Development Division of the Montana Office of Tourism and the Montana Department of Commerce in a new effort to help revitalize historic downtowns in Montana, after the Montana Main Street Program had been cut in the 2013 Legislative Session. At the time twenty-one communities were participating in the program.

Certified Programs

- Butte, Mainstreet Uptown Butte, Inc., member since 2008
- Stevensville, Stevensville Main Street Association, member since 2008

Affiliate Programs

- Anaconda, Anaconda Main Street Program, selected as one of three pilot projects for the Montana Main Street Program on April 6, 2006.
- Baker, member since 2020
- Billings, member since 2010
- Boulder, member since 2011
- Deer Lodge, member since 2012
- Ekalaka, member since 2020
- Ennis, member since 2018
- Glasgow, member since 2008
- Glendive, member since 2010
- Hamilton, member since 2014
- Hardin, member since 2009
- Havre, member since 2020
- Helena, member since 2013
- Libby, Libby Revitalization, Inc., member since 2010
- Lincoln, member since 2020
- Livingston, Vision Livingston Downtown Partnership, member since 2019
- Miles City, member since 2013
- Polson, Polson CDA - Main Street Project, selected as one of three pilot projects for the Montana Main Street Program on April 6, 2006.
- Red Lodge, Red Lodge Economic Development Corporation. Revitalization plan was created in 1986. Selected as one of three pilot projects for the Montana Main Street Program on April 6, 2006.
- Terry, member since 2012
- Thompson Falls, member since 2014
- Townsend, member since 2008
- Twin Bridges, member since 2015
- Whitehall, member since 2010

=== Nebraska ===
- Alliance, Historic Alliance Main Street
- Beatrice, Main Street Beatrice, Inc.
- Elkhorn - Elkhorn Station, Elkhorn Station Main Street
- Falls City - Falls City Main Street
- Fremont, MainStreet of Fremont, Inc.
- Geneva, Revitalize Geneva
- Grand Island, Downtown Grand Island Main Street
- Kearney, Downtown Kearney: The Bricks
- Nebraska City, Nebraska City Main Street
- Plattsmouth, Plattsmouth Main Street
- Sidney, Historic Downtown Sidney
- Wayne, Main Street Wayne
- York, York Towne Centre Main Street

=== Nevada ===
No designated programs

=== New Hampshire ===
- Berlin, Berlin Main Street
- Colebrook, Colebrook Downtown Development Association
- Concord, Main Street Concord, Inc.
- Dover, Dover Main Street
- Enfield, Enfield Village Association
- Goffstown, Goffstown Main Street Program, Inc.
- Hillsborough, Hillsborough Pride
- Jaffrey, T.E.A.M. Jaffrey
- Laconia, Main Street Laconia
- Lisbon, Lisbon Main Street, Inc.
- Littleton, Littleton Main Street
- Meredith, Greater Meredith Program, Inc.
- Nashua, Great American Downtown, Inc.
- Ossipee, Ossipee Revitalization Group, Inc.
- Plymouth, Main Street Plymouth, Inc.
- Rochester, Rochester Main Street
- Somersworth, Somersworth Main Street
- Tilton, Tilton Main Street
- Wilton, Wilton Main Street Association

=== New Jersey ===
New Jersey has two Great American Main Street Award winners: Westfield (2004) and Montclair (2015). Today the Main Street New Jersey coordinating program is operated by the New Jersey Department of Community Affairs in Trenton, New Jersey.

- Atlantic City - Atlantic Avenue, Main Street Atlantic City
- Boonton, Boonton Main Street
- Bridgeton, Bridgeton Main Street Association
- Burlington, Main Street Burlington
- Caldwell, Caldwell Downtown Alliance
- Camden - Broadway, Broadway Main Street
- Camden - Fairview, Fairview Main Street
- Englewood, Englewood Main Street Program
- Glassboro, Borough of Glassboro
- Hammonton, Main Street Hammonton
- Highland Park, Main Street Highland Park
- Jersey City - Monticello Avenue, Monticello Community
- Lawrenceville, Lawrenceville Main Street
- Maple Shade, Main Street Maple Shade
- Merchantville, Main Street Merchantville
- Metuchen, Metuchen Downtown Alliance
- Millville, Main Street Millville
- Montclair, Montclair Center Improvement District
- Mount Holly, Main Street Mount Holly
- New Egypt, Main Street New Egypt
- Newton, Main Street Newton, Inc.
- Ocean City, Main Street Ocean City
- Orange, Orange Main Street/City of Orange
- Red Bank, Red Bank RiverCenter
- Salem, Salem Main Street/Stand Up for Salem
- Somerville, Somerville District Management Corporation
- South Amboy, City of South Amboy
- South Orange, Main Street South Orange, Inc.
- Trenton - Capitol South, Capital South Main Street
- Vineland, Main Street Vineland - VDID
- West Orange, Downtown West Orange Alliance
- Westfield, Downtown Westfield Corporation
- Wildwood, Main Street Wildwood, Inc.
- Woodbury, Main Street Woodbury

=== New Mexico ===
- Alamogordo Alamogordo MainStreet
- Albuquerque - Albuquerque Downtown, Downtown Action Team, Nob Hill MainStreet
- Artesia, Artesia MainStreet, Inc.
- Bernalillo, Bernalillo Main Street Association
- Belen Belen MainStreet
- Carlsbad, Carlsbad MainStreet Project
- Clayton, Clayton MainStreet
- Clovis, Clovis MainStreet
- Corrales, Corrales Main Street, Inc.
- Deming, Deming Main Street
- Farmington, Farmington Downtown Association
- Gallup Gallup MainStreet
- Grants, Grants MainStreet Project
- Harding County, New Mexico Harding County MainStreet
- Hobbs, MainStreet Hobbs, Inc.
- Las Cruces, Downtown Las Cruces Partnership
- Las Vegas, MainStreet Las Vegas
- Los Alamos, Los Alamos MainStreet Future
- Lovington, Lovington Main Street
- Portales, Portales Main Street Program
- Raton, Raton Main Street
- Roswell, MainStreet Roswell
- Santa Rosa - Downtown, Santa Rosa Main Street
- Silver City, Silver City MainStreet Project
- Tucumcari, Tucumcari MainStreet
- Truth or Consequences MainStreet Truth or Consequences
- Zuni Pueblo

=== New York ===
New York is one of the few states in the US that does not have a state coordinating program officially recognized by Main Street America. That has not prevented a number of communities from pursuing downtown revitalization, with several that have faithfully followed the Main Street Approach.

Non-Designated Programs

- Albion, Albion Main Street Alliance
- Castleton-on-Hudson, Castleton-on-Hudson Main Street Association
- Cazenovia, When the National Trust for Historic Preservation was developing a program for downtown revitalization in the 1970s, Cazenovia is one of three towns frequently cited as a success story.
- Corning, Gaffer District. Home of Corning Glass Works and the prototype in the 1970s for downtown revitalizations programs that followed nationwide. Cited as an early success story for efforts to revitalize the downtown following a major flood.
- Ithaca, Downtown Ithaca. Mary Means, field staff member of the National Trust for Historic Preservation visited and gave a talk on "Conservation of Townscape" on April 10, 1976.
- Lockport, Lockport Downtown, Inc.
- Lyons, Lyons Main Street
- Oyster Bay, Oyster Bay Main Street Association

=== North Carolina ===
- Albemarle, Albemarle Downtown Development Corporation
- Belmont, Downtown Belmont, Inc.
- Boone, Downtown Boone Development Association
- Brevard, Heart of Brevard, Inc.
- Burlington, Burlington Downtown Development Corporation
- Clayton, Clayton Downtown Development Assoc.
- Clinton, City of Clinton
- Concord, Concord Downtown Development Corporation
- Cullowhee, CuRvE (Cullowhee Revitalization Endeavor)
- Davidson
- Eden, City of Eden
- Edenton, Destination Downtown Edenton
- Elizabeth City, Elizabeth City Downtown, Inc.
- Elkin, Town of Elkin
- Farmville, Farmville Downtown Partnership
- Forest City, Town of Forest City
- Franklin, Franklin Main Street
- Fuquay-Varina, Fuquay-Varina Revitalization Association
- Garner, Garner Revitalization Association
- Goldsboro, Downtown Goldsboro
- Henderson, City of Henderson
- Hendersonville, Downtown Hendersonville, Inc.
- Hertford, Historic Hertford, Inc.
- Hickory, Hickory Downtown Development Association
- Kings Mountain
- Kinston, Pride of Kinston, Inc.
- Lenoir, City of Lenoir
- Lexington, Uptown Lexington, Inc.
- Lincolnton, City of Lincolnton
- Lumberton, Lumberton Main Street Program
- Marion, Marion Downtown Business Association
- Mocksville, Davie County Community Development Corporation
- Monroe, Downtown Monroe, Inc.
- Mooresville, Mooresville Downtown Commission
- Morehead City, Downtown Morehead City
- Morganton, City of Morganton
- New Bern, Swiss Bear, Inc.
- Newton, City of Newton Main Street Program
- North Wilkesboro, Historic Downtown North Wilkesboro
- Oxford, City of Oxford
- Reidsville, Reidsville Downtown
- Roanoke Rapids, Roanoke Avenue Business Alliance
- Rocky Mount, City of Rocky Mount Main Street Program
- Roxboro, Roxboro Uptown Development Corporation
- Rutherford, Rutherford Town Revitalization
- Salisbury, Downtown Salisbury, Inc.
- Sanford, Downtown Sanford
- Shelby, Uptown Shelby Association, Inc.
- Smithfield, Downtown Smithfield Development Corporation
- Southport, Southport 2000
- Sparta, Sparta Revitalization Committee
- Spruce Pine, Spruce Pine Main Street Program
- Statesville, Downtown Statesville
- Sylva, Sylva Partners in Renewal, Inc.
- Tarboro, Town of Tarboro
- Wadesboro, Uptown Wadesboro, Inc.
- Wake Forest, Wake Forest Downtown Revitalization Association
- Washington, City of Washington
- Waynesville, Downtown Waynesville Association
- Wilson, Wilson Downtown

=== North Dakota ===
No designated programs

=== Ohio ===
- Cambridge, Cambridge Main Street
- Cleveland - Historic Gateway, Historic Gateway Neighborhood Corporation
- Cleveland - Warehouse District, Historic Warehouse District Development Corporation
- Defiance, Defiance Development & Visitors Bureau
- Delaware, Main Street Delaware, Inc.
- Greenville, Main Street Greenville
- Kent, Main Street Kent
- Lakewood, Main Street Lakewood
- Lorain, Main Street Lorain
- Medina, Main Street Medina. When the National Trust for Historic Preservation was developing a program for downtown revitalization in the 1970s, Medina is one of three towns frequently cited as a success story.
- Middletown, Downtown Middletown
- Millersburg, Historic Millersburg
- Mount Vernon, Main Street Mount Vernon
- Norwalk, Main Street Norwalk
- Piqua, Main Street Piqua, Inc.
- Portsmouth, Main Street Portsmouth
- Sandusky, Sandusky Main Street Association
- Tiffin, Main Street Tiffin - SIEDC
- Troy, Troy Main Street
- Van Wert, Main Street Van Wert
- Vermilion, Main Street Vermilion
- Wadsworth, Main Street Wadsworth
- Wooster, Main Street Wooster, Inc.

=== Oklahoma ===
- Ada, Ada Main Street, Inc.
- Altus, Main Street Altus
- Ardmore, Ardmore Main Street Authority
- Cherokee, Cherokee Main Street
- Claremore, Claremore Main Street
- Collinsville, Collinsville Downtown, Inc.
- Duncan, Main Street Duncan, Inc.
- Durant, Durant Main Street
- El Reno, El Reno Main Street
- Enid, Main Street Enid
- Guymon, Main Street Guymon
- Hobart, Hobart Main Street
- Muskogee, Main Street Muskogee
- Newkirk, Newkirk Main Street Authority
- Oklahoma City - Stockyards City, Stockyards City Main Street
- Okmulgee, Okmulgee Main Street
- Perry, Perry Main Street
- Ponca City, Ponca City Main Street
- Poteau, Historic Downtown Poteau
- Pryor, Pryor Main Street
- Sapulpa, Sapulpa Main Street
- Stillwater, Downtown Stillwater Association
- Tahlequah, Tahlequah Main Street Association
- Tulsa, East Tulsa Main Street
- Tulsa, Historic Greenwood District Main Street
- Tulsa - Tulsa Route 66 Main Street
- Tulsa - Kendall Whittier, Kendall Whittier Main Street
- Wilburton, Wilburton Main Street, Inc.
- Woodward, Woodward Main Street
- Yukon, Yukon 66 Main Street

=== Oregon ===
There are three levels of designation in Oregon: Performing Main Street, Transforming Downtown, and Exploring Downtown. Today they are 64 Main Street programs in Oregon.

Performing Main Street

- Albany, Albany Downtown Association
- Astoria, Astoria Downtown Historic District Association
- Portland, Alberta Main Street
- Corvallis, Downtown Corvallis Association
- Estacada, Estacada Development Association & Downtown Estacada Commission
- La Grande, La Grande Main Street Downtown
- McMinnville, McMinnville Downtown Association
- Oregon City, Main Street Oregon City
- Roseburg, Roseburg Town Center

Transforming Downtown

- Bandon, Greater Bandon Association
- Beaverton, Beaverton Downtown Association
- Carlton, Carlton Business Association
- Coos Bay, Coos Bay Downtown Association
- Cottage Grove, Main Street Cottage Grove
- Dallas, Dallas Downtown Association
- Dayton, Dayton Community Development Association
- Hillsboro, Hillsboro Downtown Partnership
- Klamath Falls, Klamath Falls Downtown Association
- Lebanon, Lebanon Downtown Association
- Milton-Freewater, Milton-Freewater Downtown Alliance
- Newberg, Newberg Downtown Coalition
- Pendleton, Pendleton Downtown Association
- Port Orford, Port Orford Main Street Revitalization Association
- Tillamook, Tillamook Chamber of Commerce

Not Designated - May be Active or Inactive

- Baker City, Historic Baker City, Inc.
- Newberg, Newberg Downtown Coalition
- The Dalles, The Dalles Main Street Program

=== Pennsylvania ===
After the "Main Street Project" concluded in 1979, Pennsylvania was one of the first six states selected for establishment of a statewide coordinating program. Today the Pennsylvania Downtown Center, founded in 1987, is the state coordinating program for Pennsylvania.

- Ambler, Pennsylvania, Ambler Main Street
- Ardmore - Lower Merion, The Ardmore Initiative
- Ashland, Ashland Downtown Inc.
- Bedford, Downtown Bedford, Inc.
- Blairsville, Blairsville Downtown
- Blossburg, Blossburg VIBE
- Boyertown, Building a Better Boyertown
- Bradford, Downtown Bradford
- Bristol, D&L Landmark Towns
- Canonsburg, Canonsburg Renaissance Committee
- Carlisle, Downtown Carlisle Association
- Chambersburg, Downtown Chambersburg, Inc.
- Cheltenham - Cheltenham Township, Cheltenham Township Main Street
- Clarion, Clarion County Economic Development Corporation
- Clearfield, Pennsylvania, Clearfield Revitalization Corporation.
- Collegeville, Collegeville Economic Development Corp.
- Danville, Danville Business Alliance
- DuBois, Downtown DuBois Revitalization Group
- East Stroudsburg, Eastburg Community Alliance
- Easton, Easton Main Street Initiative
- Ebensburg, Ebensburg Area Business Comm.
- Elizabethtown, Elizabethtown Main Street
- Elkins Park - Cheltenham, Cheltenham Township Main Street
- Emmaus, Emmaus Main Street
- Ephrata, Downtown Ephrata, Inc.
- Etna, Etna Economic Development Corp
- Gettysburg, Main Street Gettysburg, Inc.
- Greensburg, Greensburg Community Development Corp
- Grove City, Olde Town Grove City
- Hamburg, Our Town Foundation
- Hollidaysburg, Borough of Hollidaysburg
- Indiana, Downtown Indiana, Inc.
- Irwin, The Irwin Project
- Jenkintown, Jenkintown Community Alliance
- Johnstown, Johnstown Main Street
- Kennett Square, Historic Kennett Square
- Kutztown, Kutztown Community Partnership
- Lansdowne, Lansdowne Economic Development Corporation
- Latrobe, Latrobe Community Revitalization Program
- Lehigh County-Northampton, County of Lehigh
- Lewisburg, Lewisburg Downtown Partnership
- Lewistown, Lewistown Main Street
- Lititz, Venture Lititz, Inc.
- Lock Haven, Downtown Lock Haven, Inc.
- Lycoming County, Our Towns 2010
- Manheim, Manheim Downtown Development Group
- Meyersdale, Meyersdale Renaissance, Inc.
- Middletown, Greater Middletown Economic Development Corporation
- Mifflinburg, Mifflinburg Heritage Revitalization
- Millvale, Millvale Main Street
- Milton, The Improved Milton Experience
- Montrose, Montrose Restoration Committee
- Mount Joy, Main Street Mount Joy
- Mt. Lebanon - Washington Road, Mt. Lebanon Municipality
- Newtown, Joint Downtown Newtown Corporation
- Northern Dauphin County, Northern Dauphin Revitalization Project
- Oxford, Oxford Main Street
- Penbrook, Penbrook Revitalization, Inc.
- Philadelphia - Allegheny West, Allegheny West Foundation
- Philadelphia - East Passyunk, East Passyunk Avenue Business Improvement District
- Philadelphia - Frankford, Frankford CDC
- Philadelphia - H.A.C.E., HACE-Hispanic Association of Contractors & Enterprises
- Philadelphia - Lancaster Avenue, Peoples Emergency Center
- Philadelphia - Mount Airy, Mt. Airy USA
- Philadelphia - Roxborough-Ridge Avenue, Roxborough Development Corporation
- Philipsburg, Philipsburg Main Street Program
- Phoenixville, Phoenixville Main Street
- Pittsburgh - Bloomfield, Bloomfield Business Association
- Pittsburgh - East Carson, Main Street on East Carson
- Pittsburgh - Friendship, Friendship Development Associates, Inc
- Pittsburgh - Lawrenceville, Lawrenceville Corporation
- Pittsburgh - Mount Washington, Mt. Washington Community Development Corporation
- Pittsburgh - North Side, Northside Leadership Conference
- Pittsburgh - Strip District, Neighbors In The Strip
- Pottstown, Pottstown Downtown Improvement
- Pottsville, Pottsville Area Development Corporation
- Quakertown, Quakertown Alive!
- Ridgway, Ridgway Heritage Council
- Saxonburg, John Roebling's Historic Saxonburg
- Selinsgrove, Selinsgrove Projects, Inc.
- Shenandoah, Downtown Shenandoah, Inc.
- Somerset, Somerset, Inc.
- Souderton-Telford, Souderton-Telford Main Streets
- State College, Downtown Improvement District
- Susquehanna Depot, The Trehab Center
- Tamaqua, Downtown Tamaqua
- Telford-Souderton, Mr. D. Bradley Price
- Uniontown, Uniontown Downtown Business
- Upper Schuylkill, Upper Schuylkill Downtowns
- Vandergrift, Vandergrift Improvement Program
- Warren, Warren Co.-Forest EOC Main Street Program
- Warren, Warren Main Street
- Washington, Washington Business District
- Waynesboro, Main Street Waynesboro
- Waynesburg, Waynesburg Prosperous & Beautiful
- West Chester, West Chester BID
- West Newton, Downtown West Newton Inc.
- West Reading, West Reading Main Street
- Williamsport, Our Towns 2010
- York, Main Street York, Inc.

=== Rhode Island ===
No designated programs

=== South Carolina ===
The South Carolina Downtown Development Association was formed as a private, nonprofit organization in 1984. Five of the original towns in the South Carolina Main Street Program named in 1984 were Sumter, Chester, Union, Lancaster, and Georgetown. In 1985 they were joined by five more towns: Clinton, Beaufort, Gaffney, Greer, and Seneca. Another five cities were named to the program in 1986: Anderson, Bennettsville, Camden, Conway, and Darlington. A call went out in 1999 for "1,000 Friends of South Carolina" to support the ongoing work of the South Carolina Downtown Development Association. That call for supporters reflected on the effectiveness of a grassroots approach to achieve community revitalization over the past 16 years.

Designated Communities

- Beaufort, Main Street Beaufort, USA
- Bennettsville, Main Street Bennettsville
- Florence, Florence Downtown Development Corporation
- Great Falls, Great Falls Hometown Association
- Hartsville, Hartsville Downtown Development Association
- Lancaster, Lancaster - See Lancaster
- Laurens, Main Street Laurens, USA
- Manning, Main Street Manning, selected in January 2008 to participate in South Carolina Main Street program
- Marion, Historic Marion Revitalization
- Orangeburg, Downtown Orangeburg
- Summerville, Summerville D.R.E.A.M.

Non-Designated Communities - may be active or inactive

- Anderson
- Camden
- Chester
- Conway
- Darlington
- Georgetown
- Seneca, Michael Young was selected as the downtown director in January 1985 by the Seneca United Revitalization Efforts (SURE) committee.
- Sumter
- Union

=== South Dakota ===
One of the three original "Main Street Project" communities was in Hot Springs, South Dakota, from 1977-1979. As of 2021, however, there are no Main Street America designated programs in South Dakota, nor is there an active state coordinating program. Of the downtowns in South Dakota some follow the Main Street Approach, while others are a downtown association or chamber of commerce format.

Non-Designated Communities

- Aberdeen, Aberdeen Downtown Association
- Brookings, Downtown Brookings
- Dell Rapids, Dell Rapids Chamber of Commerce
- Deadwood, Deadwood Chamber of Commerce. Deadwood was one of the earliest communities to receive funding from the National Trust Historic Preservation in support of commercial district revitalization. As a precursor to the Main Street Program, in April 1974 architect Steven Stoltz, of the firm Steffan and Stoltz in Iowa, presented architectural drawings of buildings on Main Street with directions of what would be needed to restore each one. The state provided $15,250 and National Trust another $1,000.
- Hot Springs, Hot Springs Chamber of Commerce.
- Huron, Huron Downtown Beautification Committee
- Lead, Lead Downtown Revitalization Project
- Mitchell, Mitchell Main Street and Beyond
- Pierre, Historic Downtown Pierre Association
- Rapid City, Downtown Rapid City. It is here that noted preservation expert Donovan Rypkema was an appraiser and owner of the Buell Building at 632 St. Joseph St. Rypkema would go on to have a distinctive career in historic preservation working extensively in the US and Internationally through his PlaceEconomics and Heritage Strategies International consulting firms.
- Sioux Falls, Downtown Sioux Falls
- Spearfish, Downtown Spearfish
- Vermillion, Downtown Vermillion
- Watertown, Watertown Urban Renewal District
- Yankton, Historic Downtown Yankton

=== Tennessee ===
- Bristol, Believe in Bristol/Bristol Main Street
- Cleveland, Main Street Cleveland
- Collierville, Main Street Collierville
- Columbia, Columbia Main Street
- Cookeville, Operation CityScape
- Dandridge, Town of Dandridge
- Dayton, Dayton Main Street Program
- Dyersburg, Downtown Dyersburg
- Fayetteville, Fayetteville Main Street
- Franklin, Downtown Franklin Association
- Gallatin, Greater Gallatin, Inc.
- Greeneville, Main Street Greeneville, Inc
- Jackson, Jackson Downtown Development Corporation
- Johnson City, Johnson City
- Kingsport, Downtown Kingsport Assoc.
- Lawrenceburg, Main Street Lawrenceburg
- McMinnville, Main Street McMinnville
- Murfreesboro, Main Street: Murfreesboro
- Rogersville, Rogersville Hawkins County
- Savannah, Savannah Main Street Program
- Tiptonville, Tiptonville Main Street
- Union City, Main Street Union City

=== Texas ===
After the "Main Street Project" concluded in 1979, Texas one was one of the first six states selected for establishment of a statewide coordinating program. Texas Main Street was established under the Texas Historical Commission and based in Austin, Texas. In 1981, Seguin received a "Resource Team" that spent a week with business and civic leaders, bankers, elected officials, and the newly appointed Main Street Manager. Over the next 3 years plans to rehab several building were aided by a low-interest loan pool established by local banks. Anice Read led the program from the start until she retired in 1996. As of 2021, Debra Drescher leads a 9-person staff serving 88 communities.

- Amarillo, Center City of Amarillo, Inc.
- Bastrop, Bastrop Main Street Program
- Bay City, Bay City Main Street
- Beaumont, Beaumont Main Street, A Project of BUILD, Inc.
- Beeville, Beeville Main Street Program
- Brenham, City of Brenham
- Bridgeport, Bridgeport Main Street Program
- Brownsville, Brownsville Main Street Program
- Buda, Buda Main Street Program
- Caldwell, Caldwell Main Street Program
- Canton, Canton Main Street Program
- Canyon, Canyon Main Street
- Carthage, Carthage Main Street
- Celina, Celina Main Street Program
- Childress, Childress Main Street Program
- Clarksville, Clarksville Main Street
- Clifton, Clifton Main Street
- Colorado City, Colorado City Main Street Program
- Corpus Christi, Corpus Christi Downtown Management District
- Corsicana, Corsicana Main Street
- Cotulla, Cotulla Main Street Program
- Cuero, Cuero Main Street Program
- Decatur, Decatur Main Street
- Del Rio, City of Del Rio
- Denison, Denison Main Street
- Denton, City of Denton Downtown Development Program
- Eagle Pass, Eagle Pass Main Street Program
- Elgin, Elgin Main Street
- Ennis, Ennis Main Street
- Farmersville, Farmersville Main Street Program
- Georgetown, Georgetown Main Street
- Gladewater, Gladewater Main Street
- Goliad, Goliad Main Street Project
- Gonzales, Gonzales Main Street
- Grand Saline, Grand Saline Main Street Program
- Grapevine, Grapevine Main Street
- Greenville, Greenville Main Street
- Harlingen, Harlingen Downtown Improvement District
- Henderson, Henderson Main Street Project
- Hillsboro, Hillsboro Main Street Program
- Houston Emancipation Avenue
- Huntsville, Huntsville Main Street Program
- Kerrville, Kerrville Main Street
- Kilgore, Kilgore Main Street Program
- Kingsville, Kingsville Main Street Program
- La Grange, Main Street LaGrange
- Laredo, Streets of Laredo Urban Mall
- Levelland, Main Street Levelland
- Linden, Linden Main Street
- Livingston, Livingston Main Street Program
- Llano, Llano Main Street Program
- Longview, Longview Partnership
- Lufkin, Main Street Lufkin
- Luling, Luling Main Street
- Marshall, Marshall Main Street Program
- McKinney, McKinney Main Street
- Mineola, Mineola Main Street
- Mount Pleasant, Mount Pleasant Main Street
- Mount Vernon, Mount Vernon Main Street
- Nacogdoches, Main Street Nacogdoches
- New Braunfels, New Braunfels Main Street
- Palestine, Palestine Main Street Program
- Paris, Paris Main Street Project
- Pearsall, Pearsall Main Street Program
- Pharr, City of Pharr
- Pilot Point, Pilot Point Main Street
- Pittsburg, Main Street Pittsburg
- Plainview, City of Plainview
- Rio Grande City, Rio Grande City Main Street
- Rockwall, Rockwall Main Street
- Rosenberg, Rosenberg Main Street
- Royse City, Royse City Main Street
- San Angelo, San Angelo Main Street Program
- San Augustine, Sane Augustine Main Street
- San Marcos, Main Street San Marcos
- Sealy, Sealy Main Street
- Seguin, Seguin Main Street Program
- Sherman, Sherman Main Street
- Taylor, Taylor Main Street
- Temple, Temple Main Street
- Texarkana, Texarkana Main Street Program
- Tyler, Heart of Tyler
- Uvalde, Uvalde Main Street
- Vernon, Vernon Main Street
- Victoria, Victoria Main Street
- Waco, City Center Waco
- Waxahachie, Main Street Program, City of Waxahachie
- Weatherford, Weatherford Main Street
- Winnsboro, Main Street Winnsboro

=== Utah ===
No designated programs

=== Vermont ===
- Barre, Barre Main Street Program
- Bellows Falls, Village of Bellows Falls
- Bennington, Better Bennington Corporation
- Bradford, Bradford Community Development Corporation
- Brandon, Brandon Village Partnership
- Brattleboro, Building a Better Brattleboro
- Bristol, Bristol Downtown Community Partnership
- Burlington, Church Street Marketplace
- Middlebury, Middlebury Business Association
- Montpelier, Montpelier Downtown Community Association
- Morristown, Town of Morristown
- Newport, Newport City Downtown
- Poultney, Poultney Downtown Revitalization
- Randolph, Randolph Area Community
- Rutland, Rutland Partnership
- Springfield, Springfield on the Move
- St. Albans, St. Albans for the Future
- St. Johnsbury, St. Johnsbury Economic Development Office
- Stowe, www.gostowe.com, Stowe Area Association
- Vergennes, Vergennes Partnership, Inc.
- Waterbury, Downtown Waterbury Partnership
- White River Junction/Hartford, White River Junction/Hartford
- Windsor, Windsor Mount Ascutney
- Winooski, Downtown Winooski Inc.

=== Virginia ===
- Altavista, Altavista On Track
- Bedford, Bedford Main Street, Inc.
- Berryville, Berryville Main Street
- Blackstone, Downtown Blackstone, Inc.
- Culpeper, Culpeper Renaissance, Inc.
- Danville, River District Association
- Franklin, Downtown Franklin Association
- Harrisonburg, Harrisonburg Downtown Renaissance
- Luray, Luray Downtown Initiative, Inc.
- Lynchburg, Lynch's Landing
- Manassas, Historic Manassas, Inc.
- Marion, Marion Downtown Revitalization Association
- Orange, Orange Downtown Alliance
- Phoebus, Phoebus Partnership
- Radford, Main Street Radford, Inc.
- Rocky Mount, Community Partnership
- South Boston, Destination Downtown
- Staunton, Staunton Downtown Development Association
- Warrenton, The Partnership for Warrenton Foundation
- Waynesboro, Waynesboro Downtown Development, Inc.
- Winchester, Old Town Development Board

=== Washington ===
- Auburn, Auburn Downtown Association
- Bainbridge Island, Bainbridge Island Downtown Association
- Chehalis, Experience Chehalis (previously the Chehalis Community Renaissance Team)
- Chelan, Historic Downtown Chelan Association
- Ellensburg, Ellensburg Downtown Association
- Kennewick, Historic Downtown Kennewick Partnership
- Langley, Langley Main Street Association
- Mount Vernon, Mount Vernon Downtown Association
- Olympia, Olympia Downtown Association
- Port Angeles, Port Angeles Waterfront District
- Port Townsend, Port Townsend Main Street Program
- Pullman, Downtown Pullman Association
- Puyallup, Puyallup Main Street Association
- Selah, Selah Downtown Association
- Walla Walla, Downtown Walla Walla Foundation
- Wenatchee, Wenatchee Downtown Association

Affiliated Programs

- Centralia, Centralia Downtown Association
- Renton, Renton Downtown Partnership

=== West Virginia ===
- Charleston - East End, Charleston East End Main Street
- Charleston - Charleston West Side, Charleston West Side Main Street
- Fairmont, Main Street Fairmont, Inc.
- Kingwood, Main Street Kingwood
- Mannington, Mannington Main Street
- Martinsburg, Main Street Martinsburg, Inc
- Morgantown, Main Street Morgantown, Inc.
- Philippi, Main Street Philippi
- Point Pleasant, Main Street Point Pleasant
- Ripley, Main Street Ripley
- Ronceverte, Ronceverte Main Street
- St. Albans, Saint Albans Renaissance Group
- White Sulphur Springs, White Sulphur Springs

=== Wisconsin ===
Today the state coordinating program is housed within the Wisconsin Economic Development Corporation with Errin Welty as the state coordinator.

Designated Communities

- Ashland, Ashland Main Street, designated 2020
- Beloit, Downtown Beloit, Inc., designated 1988
- Chippewa Falls, Chippewa Falls Main Street, designated 1989
- Darlington, Darlington Main Street, designated 1996
- De Pere, Main Street De Pere, Inc., designated 1990
- Eagle River, Eagle River Main Street Program, designated 1999
- Fond du Lac, Downtown FDL Partnership, designated 2004
- Green Bay, On Broadway, Inc., designated 1995
- Kenosha, Downtown Kenosha, Inc., designated 2014
- La Crosse, Downtown Main Street, Inc., designated 2013. In 1976 the National Trust for Historic Preservation was involved in advocacy for preservation of the old post office in downtown La Crosse and incorporating this into downtown revitalization plans, though these efforts were ultimately unsuccessful.
- Ladysmith, Ladysmith Main Street, designated 2013
- Lake Mills, Lake Mills Main Street, designated, 2006
- Marshfield, Main Street Marshfield, designated 1990
- Mayville, Main Street Mayville, designated 2018
- Menomonie, Main Street of Menomonie, Inc., designated 2015
- Milwaukee, Historic King Drive, designated 2017
- Monroe, Monroe Main Street, designated 2005
- Omro, Future Omro Chamber-Main Street, designated 2011
- Osceola, Osceola Main Street, designated 1997
- Platteville, Platteville Main Street Program, designated 1990
- Port Washington, Port Main Street, Inc., designated 2008
- Prairie du Chien, Prairie du Chien Main Street, designated 2005
- Racine, designated 2018
- Rice Lake, Rice Lake Main Street Association, designated 1991
- Ripon, Ripon Main Street, designated 1988
- Sheboygan Falls, Sheboygan Falls Main Street. On April 9, 1975, Mary Means, field staff for the National Trust for Historic Preservation spoke on "Preservation is Good Business" to the Sheboygan Falls Downtown Preservation committee., Main Street program designated 1988.
- Shullsburg, Advance Shullsburg, designated 2016
- Sturgeon Bay, Sturgeon Bay Visitor & Commercial Development, designated 1994
- Tigerton, Tigerton Main Street, Inc., designated 1993
- Tomahawk, Tomahawk Main Street, Inc., designated 2008
- Two Rivers, Two Rivers Main Street Program, designated 1996
- Viroqua, Viroqua Chamber Main Street, designated 1989
- Watertown, Watertown Main Street Program, designated 2000
- Wausau, Main Street Wausau, designated 2002
- West Allis, Downtown West Allis BID, designated 2001

Other Communities

- Algoma, Community Improvement
- Columbus, CDDC/Main Street
- Gillett, Revitalize Gillett, Inc.
- Manitowoc, Mainly Manitowoc, Inc.
- Milwaukee, Lincoln Village Business Association
- Milwaukee, Mosaic on Burleigh, Burleigh Street CDC
- Milwaukee, North Avenue Gateway, North Avenue Community Development Corporation
- Milwaukee, Silver City, Layton Boulevard West Neighbors, Inc.
- Milwaukee, Sohi, West End Development Corporation
- Pewaukee, Positively Pewaukee
- Portage, Main Street Portage, Inc.
- Rhinelander, Downtown Rhinelander, Inc.
- Richland Center, Richland Main Street Association/Chamber
- Sharon, Sharon Main Street Project
- Stevens Point, Stevens Point Main Street Program
- West Bend, West Bend Main Street Program
- Whitewater, Downtown Whitewater, Inc.

=== Wyoming ===
- Evanston, Evanston Urban Renewal Agency
- Green River, Green River Main Street
- Laramie, Laramie Main Street
- Rawlins, Rawlins Main Street
- Rock Springs, Rock Springs Main Street
