= Merchant Tower =

- Merchant's Hotel
- U.S. National Register of Historic Places
- U.S. Historic district – Contributing property
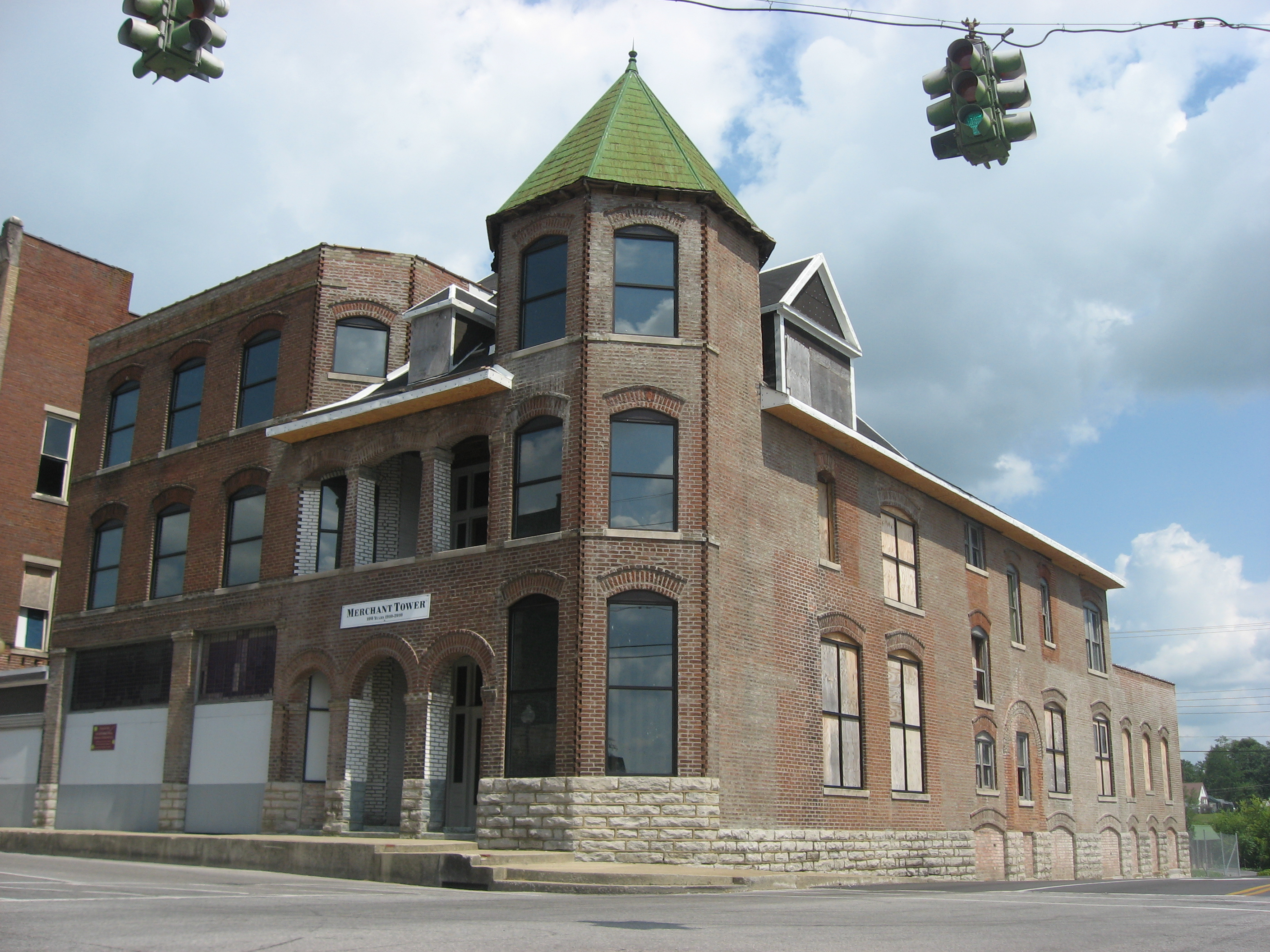
- Front and western side of the building

- Location within Kentucky Location within the United States
- Location: 102 E. Main St., Campbellsville, Kentucky
- Coordinates: 37°20′26″N 85°20′41″W
- Area: 0.2 acres (0.081 ha)
- Built: 1910
- Part of: Campbellsville Historic Commercial District (ID83002876)
- NRHP reference No.: 80001669

Significant dates
- Added to NRHP: November 25, 1980
- Designated CP: February 10, 1983

Merchant Tower (formerly known as Merchant's Hotel) is a historic structure in Campbellsville, Kentucky, United States. Built in 1910, it is listed as Merchant's Hotel on the National Register of Historic Places and is a part of the Campbellsville Historic Commercial District.

It is a three-story building built as a hotel, which later served as a rooming house.
