= Chandler House (Walton, Kentucky) =

- U.S. National Register of Historic Places
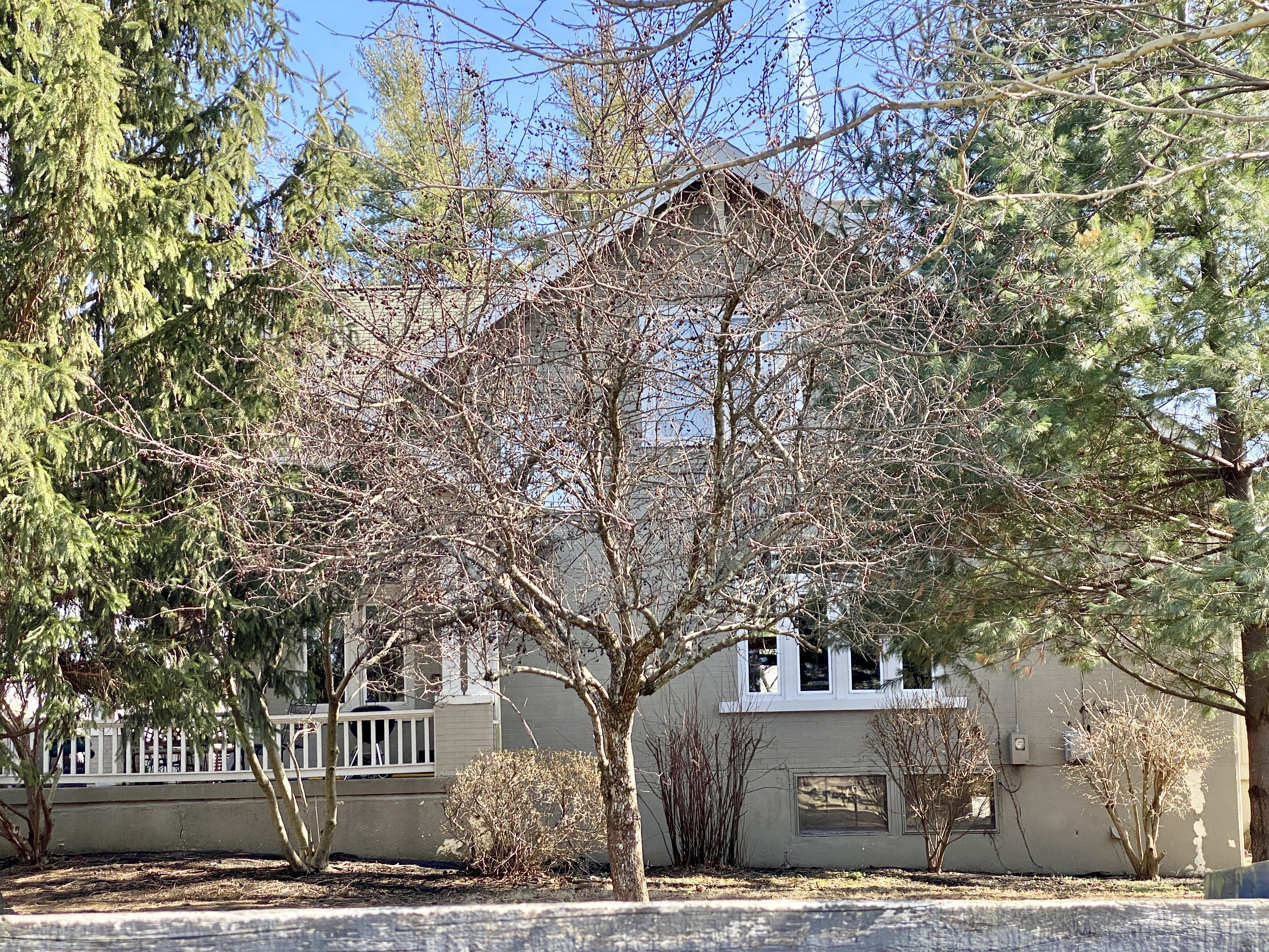

- Location within Kentucky
- Location: 167 S. Main St., Walton, Kentucky
- Coordinates: 38°51′19″N 84°36′20″W
- Area: less than one acre
- Built: c.1920s
- Architectural style: Bungalow/craftsman
- MPS: Boone County MRA
- NRHP reference No.: 88003305
- Added to NRHP: February 6, 1989

The Chandler House at 167 S. Main St. in Walton, Kentucky was built in the 1920s. It was listed on the National Register of Historic Places in 1989.

It is a 1 1/2-story house. It has a contemporary single-car hipped roof garage.
