= Orlando Main Street Program =

Human settlement in Orlando, Florida, United States of America

The Orlando Main Street Program is an organization of the city of Orlando, Florida, responsible for developing neighborhoods through a competitive selection process.

The Main Street program is part of the Main Street Initiative of the National Trust for Historic Preservation. Participating districts operate as nonprofit organizations, each one devoted to small scale economic development in their respective geographic locations. Each has a full-time, salaried executive director, but they otherwise rely on volunteers.

The Orlando Main Street Program was created in 2008 to develop new neighborhoods throughout Orlando. As of 2016, it had developed 10 new communities, including, College Park Main Street, Curry Ford West, Ivanhoe Village, Audubon Park Garden District, and Sodo (originally named Downtown South). In 2016, Audubon Park Garden District was one of three recipients of the Great American Main Street Award.

External links

- Audubon Park Garden District
- Great American Main Street Award.
