= Campbellsville Historic Commercial District =

Historic district in Kentucky, United States

- U.S. National Register of Historic Places
- U.S. Historic district
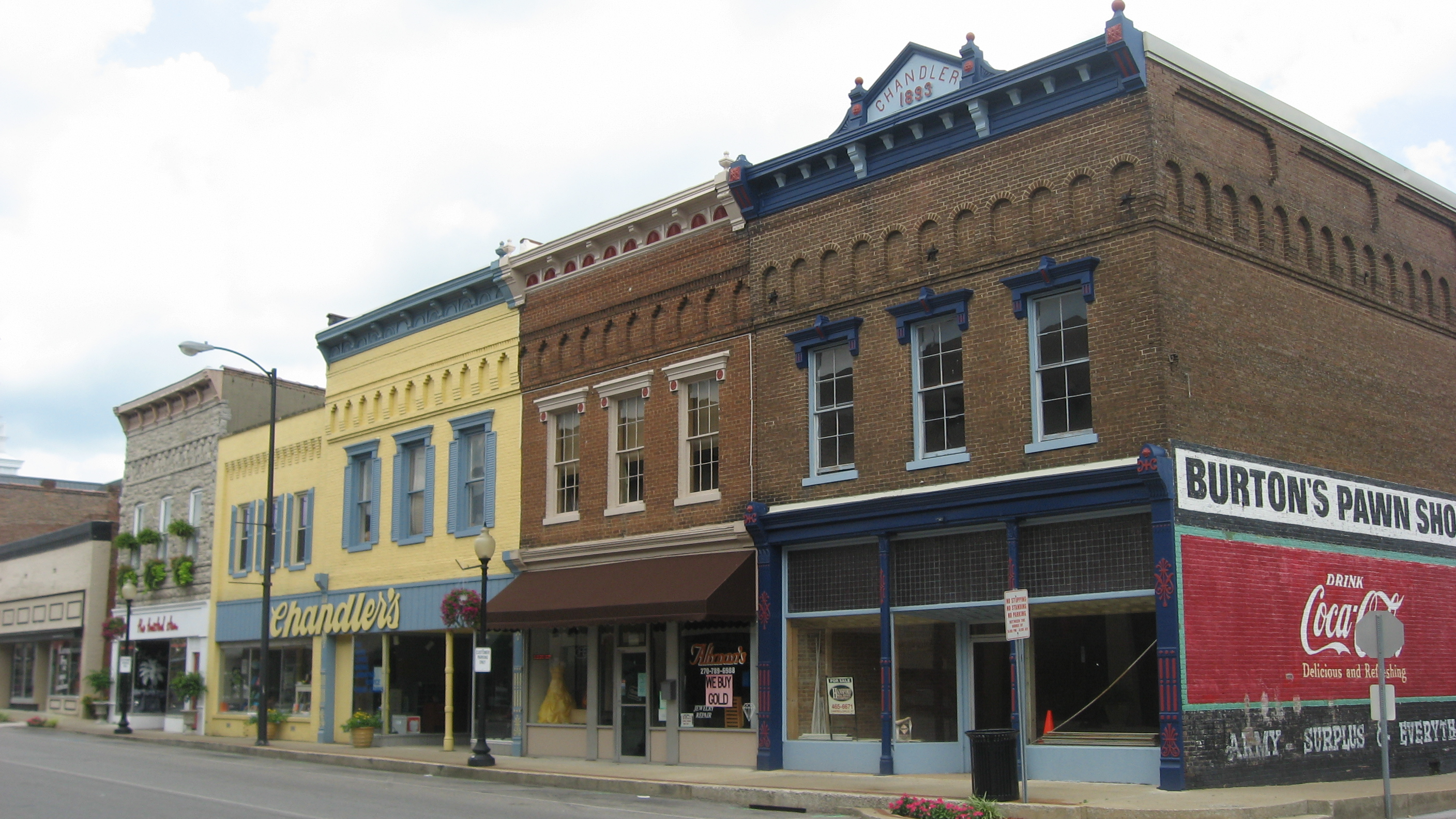
- Main Street in the district

- Location within Kentucky Location within the United States
- Location: Roughly bounded by Columbia Ave., Broadway, 1st, Hotchkiss Sts., Central Ave. (both sides), and RR tracks, Campbellsville, Kentucky
- Coordinates: 37°20′28″N 85°20′37″W
- Area: 14 acres (5.7 ha)
- Architectural style: Italianate, Romanesque
- NRHP reference No.: 83002876
- Added to NRHP: February 10, 1983

The Campbellsville Historic Commercial District comprises a collection of about 20 buildings in downtown Campbellsville, Kentucky, a 200-year-old city. The district is listed on the National Register of Historic Places.

== Location ==
The district is roughly bounded by Columbia Ave., Broadway, 1st, Hotchkiss Sts., Central Ave. (both sides), and railroad tracks.

37°20′28″N 85°20′37″W

== Buildings ==
There are about 20 buildings in downtown Campbellsville that are on the National Register of Historic Places. Including the Old Taylor County Clerks Office, the new Turner Block, the Willock Building, the Chandler Building, the Stults Building, the Ingram House and more.

== Architecture ==
The 100 and 200 block of Main Street are lined with century old brick, stone, and iron buildings with Italianate architecture facades.

== Revitalization ==
In Campbellsville's historic district, the Main Street Manager oversees preservation and revitalization. The Kentucky Heritage Council (Kentucky State Historic Preservation Office) is a valued source of information.
