= Main street manager =

A main street manager is a United States professional who helps small cities and towns maintain and improve their main street typically through a government program or public–private partnership. Objectives may include economic, preservation, restoration, marketing, and relations between business, consumers and the government.

== Objective ==
The primary objective is to develop and administer the main street program. The National Trust for Historic Preservation describes ten standards of performance for administering a main street program.

== Role ==
- Develops and administers a city's main street program
- Assists and approves applications for grants, tax credits
- Design plans for preservation and/or restoration
- Develops marketing collateral and campaigns
- Advises city planners on parking
- Determines resources needed to maintain cleanliness, appearance,
- Schedules events and festivals. Advises planners.
