= Chandler House (Stevens Creek, Arkansas) =

Historic house in Arkansas, United States

- U.S. National Register of Historic Places
- Location within Arkansas Location within the United States
- Nearest city: Stevens Creek, Arkansas
- Coordinates: 35°22′41″N 91°37′19″W
- Area: less than one acre
- Built: 1885
- Architectural style: Plain traditional gable entry
- MPS: White County MPS
- NRHP reference No.: 91001310
- Added to NRHP: July 10, 1992

The Chandler House is a historic house in rural northern White County, Arkansas. It is located just north of the junction of Stanley and Honeysuckle Roads, northwest of Bald Knob. It is a two-story wood-frame structure, with weatherboard siding and a gable roof. A hip-roofed porch extends around its front to the side, supported by square posts, and a shed-roof addition extends to the rear. The front is symmetrically arranged, three bays wide, with sash windows on either side of the entrance, and a third window in the gable above. The house was built about 1885, and is probably one of the first gable-entry houses to be built in White County, and one of a very few to survive from the 19th century.

The house was listed on the National Register of Historic Places in 1992.

== See also ==
- National Register of Historic Places listings in White County, Arkansas
