= John Chandler House =

- U.S. National Register of Historic Places
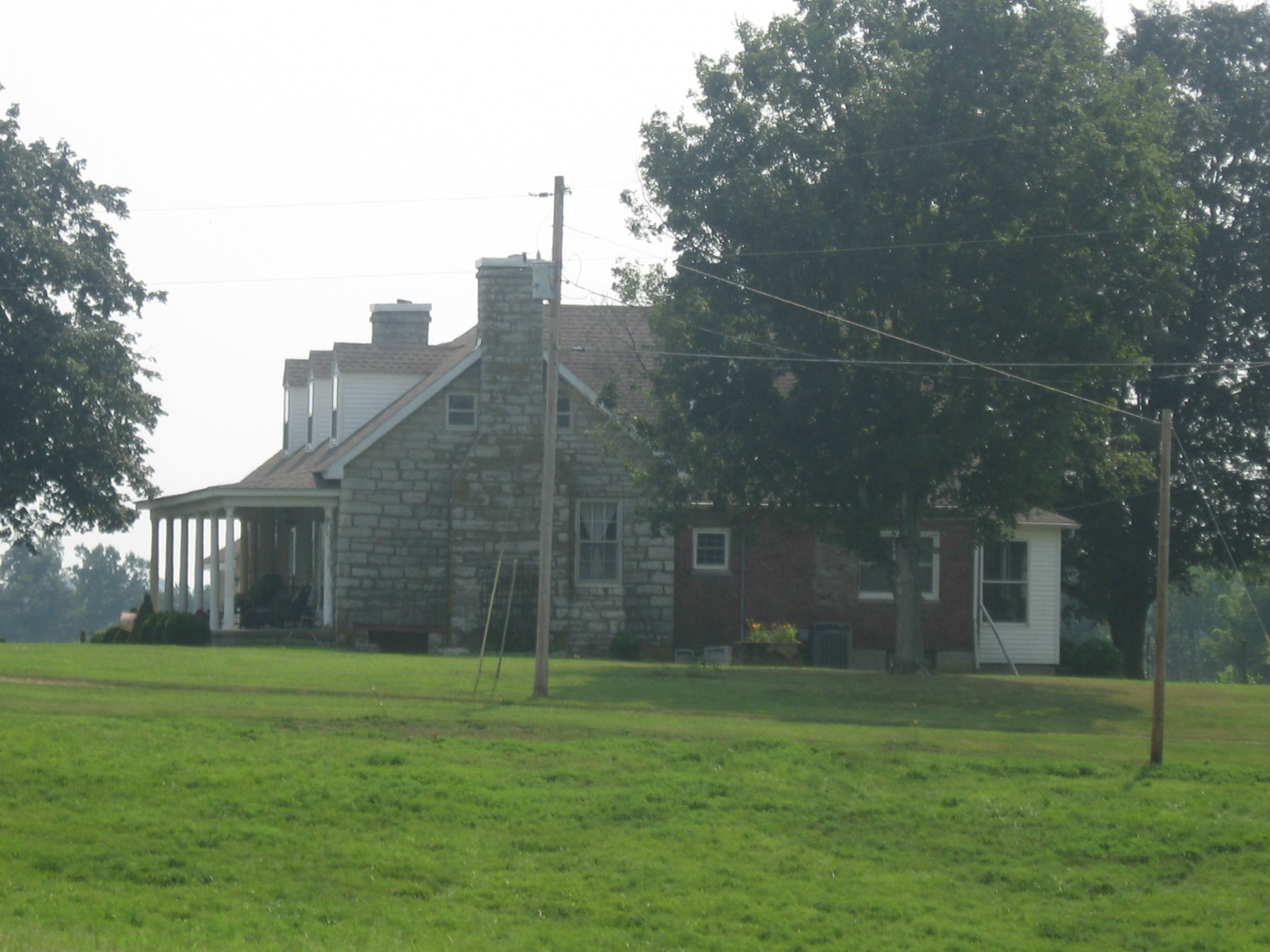

- Location within Kentucky Location within the United States
- Location: near Campbellsville, Kentucky; Off KY 210
- Coordinates: 37.36443°N 85.40084°W
- Area: 29.5 acres (11.9 ha)
- Architectural style: Federal
- MPS: Early Stone Buildings of Kentucky Outer Bluegrass and Pennyrile TR
- NRHP reference No.: 87000184
- Added to NRHP: January 8, 1987

The John Chandler House, 1/4 mile southwest of Kentucky 210, one-half mile northwest of Kentucky 883, near Campbellsville, Kentucky, was built in the early 19th century. It was listed on the National Register of Historic Places in 1987.

Built by John Chandler, pioneer Baptist Minister.
