= National Register of Historic Places listings in Bath County, Kentucky =

Location of Bath County in Kentucky

This is a list of the National Register of Historic Places listings in Bath County, Kentucky.

It is intended to be a complete list of the properties on the National Register of Historic Places in Bath County, Kentucky, United States. The locations of National Register properties for which the latitude and longitude coordinates are included below, may be seen in a map.

There are 10 properties listed on the National Register in the county.

This National Park Service list is complete through NPS recent listings posted March 21, 2025.

== Current listings ==
	Name on the Register	Image	Date listed	Location	City or town	Description
1	Bourbon Iron Works	Bourbon Iron Works	September 1, 1976 (#76000844)	2.6 miles (4.2 km) south of Owingsville on Kentucky Route 36; 38°06′51″N 83°44′53″W	Owingsville	
2	Confederate Monument in Owingsville	Confederate Monument in Owingsville	July 17, 1997 (#97000718)	East of Owingsville, 1.5 miles (2.4 km) south of U.S. Route 60; 38°08′32″N 83°45′34″W	Owingsville	
3	Myrtle Hill		October 29, 1982 (#82001550)	South of Owingsville off U.S. Route 64; 38°07′21″N 83°47′03″W	Owingsville	
4	J.J. Nesbitt House	J.J. Nesbitt House	August 5, 2010 (#10000532)	233 W. Main St. 38°08′39″N 83°46′04″W	Owingsville	
5	Col. Thomas Deye Owings House	Col. Thomas Deye Owings House	January 9, 1978 (#78001297)	Main St. and Courthouse Sq. 38°08′40″N 83°45′54″W	Owingsville	
6	Owingsville Commercial District and Courthouse Square	Owingsville Commercial District and Courthouse Square	November 20, 1978 (#78001298)	Main and Court Sts.; also 122 E. Main St. 38°08′41″N 83°45′52″W	Owingsville	122 E. Main represents a boundary increase of August 1, 1985
7	Ramey Mound		February 12, 1998 (#98000089)	0.5 miles (0.80 km) north of Sharpsburg; 38°12′27″N 83°55′51″W	Sharpsburg	
8	Sharpsburg Historic District		July 31, 2024 (#100009521)	Main Street, Back Street, Public Street, Camp Street, West Tunnel Hill Road, Forest Avenue; 38°12′05″N 83°55′44″W	Sharpsburg	
9	"Raccoon" John Smith House	"Raccoon" John Smith House	August 6, 2012 (#12000445)	250 W. Main St. 38°08′39″N 83°46′07″W	Owingsville	
10	Springfield Presbyterian Church		April 26, 1979 (#79000959)	South of Sharpsburg on Springfield Rd. 38°08′56″N 83°54′13″W	Sharpsburg	

== See also ==
- List of National Historic Landmarks in Kentucky
- National Register of Historic Places listings in Kentucky
