= Owingsville & Olympia Railroad =

Short-lived narrow-gauge line from Owingsville to Olympia, Kentucky (c. 1915–1918)

Overview
- Headquarters: Owingsville, Kentucky
- Reporting mark: O&O
- Locale: Bath County, Kentucky
- Dates of operation: 1915–1918 (abandoned)

Technical
- Length: 6 miles (9.7 km)

The Owingsville & Olympia Railroad (O&O) was a short, narrow-gauge railroad of about 6 miles (9.7 km) that linked Owingsville with the Chesapeake & Ohio (C&O) at Olympia in Bath County, Kentucky, US. The company was chartered in 1913; the line opened in 1915 as a narrow gauge common carrier intended to connect Owingsville with the regional rail network at Olympia. Service quickly faltered after an early 1915 derailment, and by 1916 there was no traffic; the railroad was listed as abandoned by 1918.

== History ==
=== Conception and construction ===
Local interests in Bath County pursued a direct outlet from Owingsville to the C&O main line (Lexington Subdivision) at Olympia, a C&O station established in the early 1880s. The O&O was chartered in 1913 and built as a narrow-gauge line; trains began running in early 1915.

=== Operations and decline (1915–1918) ===
Soon after opening, a derailment "in which a train jumped the track" undermined public confidence; by 1916 the line effectively had no traffic. Contemporary and later accounts describe the O&O as roughly 6 miles (9.7 km) long and operating only a short time (about 1915–1918). Local histories further note that the line was nicknamed the "Little Dinky," that it used a small geared locomotive, and that the rails were removed about 1918; these details remain chiefly in community sources.

== Route ==
The O&O ran from a small depot at Owingsville southward to connect with the C&O at Olympia, providing access to C&O passenger and freight services. Olympia also served the nearby Olympian Springs resort, which used hacks and omnibuses to meet trains at the station.

== Corporate notes ==
The line appears in federal style manuals as the Olympia & Owingsville Railway Co.—a corporate styling attested in the early 1920s—reflecting alternative naming used in official lists, though service on the line had ended by then.

== Legacy ==
The O&O is frequently cited as among Kentucky's shortest-lived railroads; portions of the former grade remain visible on private property near Owingsville and along the approach to Olympia in Bath County.

== See also ==
- Chesapeake & Ohio Railway
- C&O Lexington Subdivision
- Bath County, Kentucky
