= Elizabethtown, Lexington and Big Sandy Railroad =

19th-century Kentucky railroad; predecessor of the C&O Lexington Subdivision

Overview
- Headquarters: Lexington, Kentucky
- Locale: Fayette, Clark, Montgomery, Bath, Rowan, Carter, and Boyd counties, Kentucky
- Dates of operation: 1869–1892
- Predecessor: Lexington and Big Sandy Railroad
- Successor: Chesapeake and Ohio Railway (Lexington Subdivision)

The Elizabethtown, Lexington and Big Sandy Railroad (EL&BS) was a standard-gauge railroad in Kentucky that, in stages between 1871 and 1881, completed a through route from Lexington to Ashland. Much of the line became the Chesapeake & Ohio Railway's Lexington Subdivision after the C&O leased and then purchased the route by 1892. The EL&BS was the first railroad to reach Rowan County, completed there in 1881.

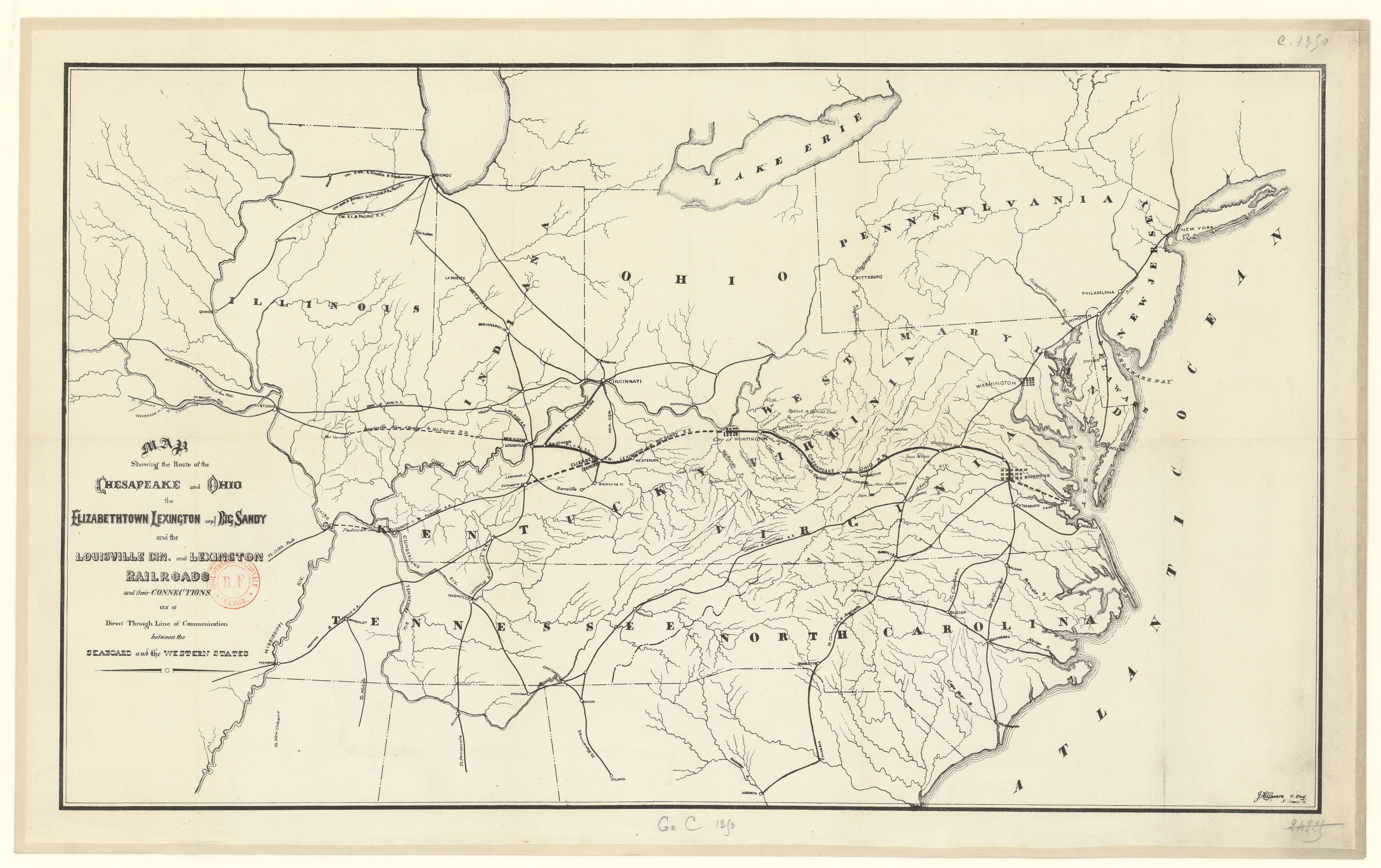
19th-century map highlighting the C&O, EL&BS, and connecting lines.

== History ==
=== Origins and early construction ===
The EL&BS traced its roots to the Lexington and Big Sandy Railroad (L&BS), chartered in 1852 to link Lexington with the Big Sandy River; local subscriptions supported initial surveying and limited grading in the 1850s. After the Civil War, the EL&BS was organized in 1869 to carry the project forward. By 1872 the line ran east from Lexington to Mt. Sterling and was under lease to the Louisville, Cincinnati & Lexington Railroad, according to Poor’s Manual of Railroads (1874/75). Poor’s lists the segment “in operation — Lexington to Mt. Sterling, 33.5 miles,” with surveys progressing toward the Big Sandy and an intended junction with the C&O.

Although styled “Elizabethtown–Lexington–Big Sandy,” the company never built west of Lexington toward Elizabethtown; contemporary studies note the western portion remained unfulfilled.

=== Completion to Ashland and C&O control ===
In 1879–81, Collis P. Huntington's Newport News & Mississippi Valley interests took control and pushed construction east from Mt. Sterling toward the coal fields. The last spike for the through Lexington–Ashland route was driven near Denton in December 1881, opening what became a 109-mile corridor. The C&O leased and subsequently absorbed the property (consolidation completed in 1892), after which the line was operated as the Lexington Subdivision with trackage rights westward over the L&N to Louisville.

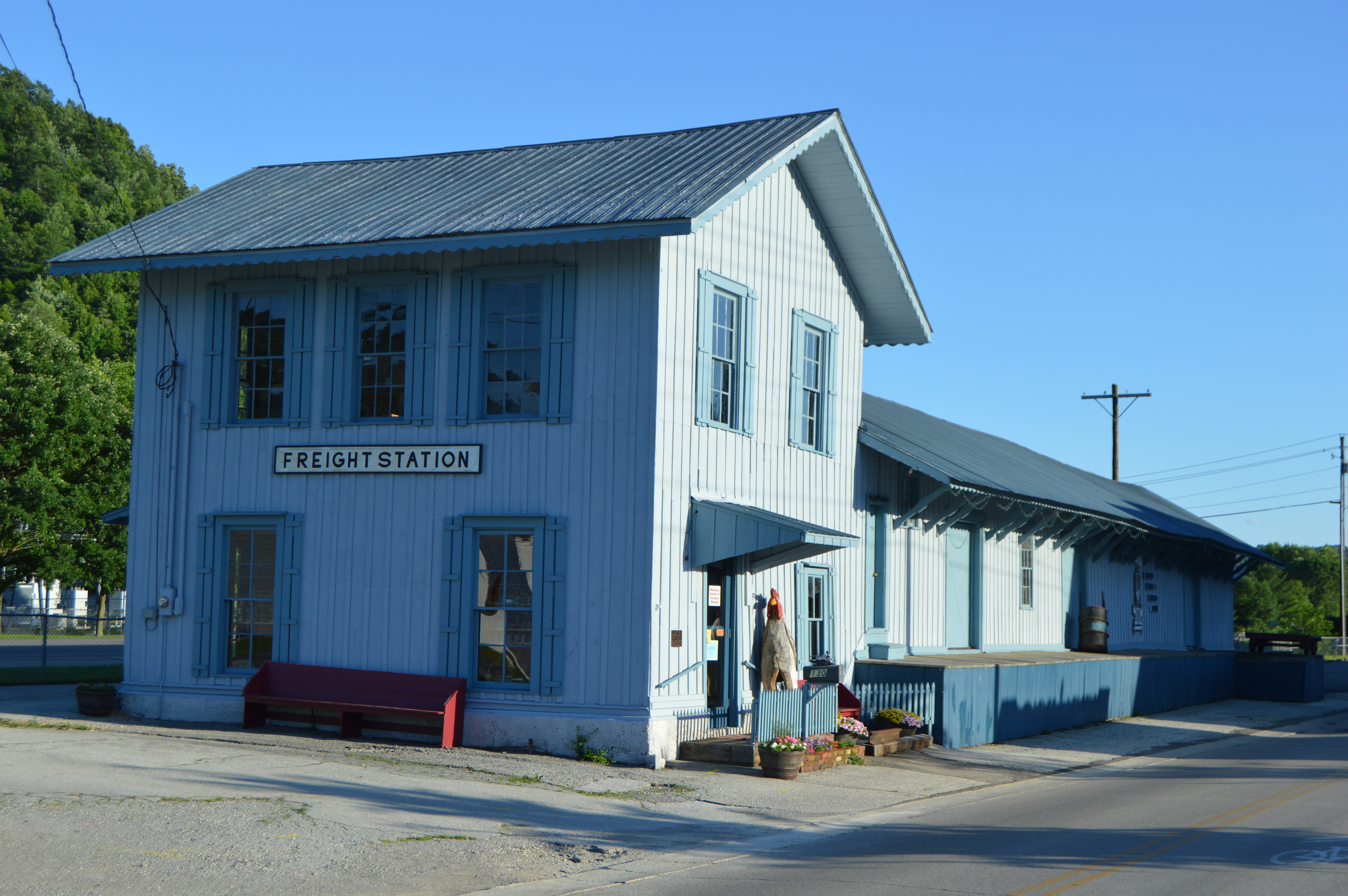
The former EL&BS freight/passenger depot at Morehead (built 1881; now NRHP-listed).

=== Facilities and passenger era ===
In communities along the route the company erected combined freight/passenger depots, notably at Morehead in 1881; later C&O improvements included brick passenger stations at Mt. Sterling and other points in the 1908–1914 period. Regular passenger service survived into the Amtrak era and ended on May 1, 1971, when Amtrak declined to continue service over the subdivision.

== Route ==
From Lexington the EL&BS (later C&O) ran east through Winchester (Clark County), Mt. Sterling (Montgomery), Salt Lick/Olympia/Preston (Bath), Morehead (Rowan), and Olive Hill/Grayson/Princess (Carter) to Ashland (Boyd). The National Park Service summarizes the C&O's leasing and purchase of the EL&BS between 1880 and 1892, crossing those counties.

== Legacy ==
Most of the Lexington Subdivision west of Ashland was abandoned in the mid-1980s; in Morehead, portions of the US-60 bypass follow the former right-of-way. A short eastern stub from Ashland to the Boyd–Carter county line remains active for local industry.

== See also ==
- C&O Lexington Subdivision
- Morehead and North Fork Railroad
- Kentucky Central Railroad
- Louisville, Cincinnati and Lexington Railroad
