= Kentucky Route 211 =

State highway in Kentucky, United States

Kentucky Route 211
- KY 211 highlighted in red

Route information
- Maintained by KYTC
- Length: 11.733 mi (18.882 km)

Southern segment
- Length: 11.233 mi (18.078 km)
- South end: KY 36 southwest of Upper Salt Lick
- Major intersections: US 60 in Salt Lick
- North end: Sparrow Road near Salt Lick

Northern segment
- Length: 0.500 mi (805 m)
- South end: Aurora Road near Grange City
- North end: KY 1722 in rural Rowan

Location
- Country: United States
- State: Kentucky
- Counties: Bath, Rowan

Highway system
- Kentucky State Highway System; Interstate; US; State; Parkways
← KY 210	→ KY 212

Kentucky Route 211 (KY 211) is a 7.1-mile-long (11.4 km) state highway in the U.S. state of Kentucky. The highway is split into two segments, separated by the Licking River. The southern segment connects mostly rural areas of Bath County with Salt Lick. The northern segment, which is significantly shorter, is in rural Rowan County.

== Route description ==
=== Southern segment ===
The southern segment of KY 211 begins at an intersection with KY 36 southwest of Upper Salt Lick, within the Daniel Boone National Forest in Bath County. It travels to the northeast and curves to a nearly due north direction while in Upper Salt Lick. It curves to the north-northeast and then to the north-northwest. The highway travels through Lower Salt Lick and then intersects the northern terminus of KY 3290 (Mud Lick Road). It then curves back to the north-northeast, crosses Salt Lick Creek, and enters Salt Lick. It passes Salt Lick Elementary School. When it intersects the southern terminus of Church Street, it turns left and travels to the northwest. Just before KY 211 intersects the southern terminus of Center Street, it leaves the national forest. Just before an intersection with the northern terminus of Railroad Street, it curves back to the northeast. It passes the Salt Lick Volunteer Fire Department and a U.S. Post Office before it curves again to the northwest. It then begins a concurrency with U.S. Route 60 (US 60). They head to the west-northwest and immediately cross over Salt Lick Creek. They then curve to the northwest and travel along the northern edge of the Daniel Boone National Forest. They leave Salt Lick and then split, with KY 211 leaving the forest and heading to the north-northeast. Immediately, the highway curves to the north-northwest and then to a due north direction. It curves back to the north-northwest and crosses over Cow Creek. It curves to the northeast. Then, KY 211 intersects the southern terminus of KY 6220 and the eastern terminus of KY 6219 (Vance Road) before crossing over Interstate 64 (I-64). Just on the north side of the interstate, the highway intersects the eastern terminus of KY 1269 (Old Sand Road). It curves to the north. Just past Vanlandingham Road, it meets the northern terminus of the southern segment, where Sparrow Road curves to the east-northeast. This is just south of the Licking River.

=== Northern segment ===
KY 211 resumes just past Licking River at a point south-southeast of Grange City, within Rowan County. It heads to the north-northeast and curves to the north-northwest and meets its northern terminus, an intersection with KY 1722 (Lower Licking Road).

== Major intersections ==
County	Location	mi	km	Destinations	Notes
Bath	Daniel Boone National Forest	0.000	0.000	KY 36 – Frenchburg, Owingsville	Southern terminus
Bath	Daniel Boone National Forest	5.439	8.753	KY 3290 south (Mud Lick Road)	Northern terminus of KY 3290
Bath	Salt Lick	6.949	11.183	US 60 east – Morehead	Southern end of US 60 concurrency
Bath	Daniel Boone National Forest	7.738	12.453	US 60 west – Owingsville	Northern end of US 60 concurrency
Bath		10.119	16.285	KY 1269 west (Old Sand Road)	Eastern terminus of KY 1269
Bath		11.233	18.078	Sparrow Road north	Northern terminus of the southern segment of KY 211
Gap in route
Rowan		11.233	18.078	Dead end	Southern terminus of the northern segment of KY 211
Rowan		11.733	18.882	KY 1722 (Lower Licking Road)	Northern terminus
1.000 mi = 1.609 km; 1.000 km = 0.621 mi
