= Ashland Coal and Iron Railway =

Kentucky short line between Ashland and Seaton; successor to L&BS Eastern Division

Overview
- Headquarters: Ashland, Kentucky
- Reporting mark: AC&I
- Locale: Boyd and Carter counties, Kentucky
- Dates of operation: 1880–1933
- Predecessor: Lexington and Big Sandy Railroad, Eastern Division
- Successor: Chesapeake and Ohio Railway

Technical
- Length: 24.742 miles (39.818 km) (main), 17.458 miles (28.096 km) (yards & sidings) at valuation date

The Ashland Coal and Iron Railway (AC&I) was a standard-gauge short line in northeastern Kentucky that owned the 24.742 miles (39.818 km) route between Ashland and Seaton (near Denton) with trackage arrangements beyond Seaton to Hitchins and Grayson. Originating as the Lexington and Big Sandy Railroad’s Eastern Division (chartered 1865), it was retitled “Ashland Coal and Iron Railway” by a Kentucky special act in March 1880/81 and operated as an industrial and common-carrier line serving iron and coal districts west of Ashland. The AC&I was leased to the Chesapeake & Ohio on January 1, 1925 and conveyed to the C&O in 1933.

== History ==
=== From L&BS Eastern Division to AC&I (1865–1881) ===
The AC&I’s corporate line began as the Lexington and Big Sandy Railroad, Eastern Division, incorporated by special act on January 25, 1865, as successor to the antebellum L&BS works around Ashland; the deed transfer of L&BS property to the Eastern Division dates to June 15, 1866. By special act approved March 31, 1880, the state authorized the name change to Ashland Coal and Iron Railway Company (some archival summaries list March 31, 1881).

The route incorporated earlier L&BS construction from the 1850s between Ashland and the ironworks at Princess/Coalton, including the 975 feet (297 m) Princess Tunnel. In 1881 the AC&I connected with the Elizabethtown, Lexington & Big Sandy line near Denton, creating a continuous Lexington–Ashland corridor later known as the C&O Lexington Subdivision.

=== Operations and traffic ===
At the ICC valuation date the AC&I owned 25.012 miles (40.253 km) of main track (including 0.270 miles (0.435 km) at Ashland leased exclusively to the C&O) and 42.470 miles (68.349 km) of all tracks; it also used C&O trackage from Seaton to Hitchins (about 4 miles (6.4 km)) and Eastern Kentucky Railway (EK) trackage from Hitchins to Grayson (about 4.5 miles (7.2 km)). Passenger service is documented at least as late as 1917; a Kentucky Court of Appeals case describes AC&I and C&O trains operating over a single track to Hitchins and using the C&O depot there for passengers.

Under Kentucky law limiting railway companies to common-carrier powers (1892), the AC&I separated its non-carrier mining and manufacturing interests, selling them in 1901–02 to the Ashland Iron & Mining Company, while retaining the railroad operations.

=== Federal control and C&O acquisition ===
The line was operated under the United States Railroad Administration during World War I (1917–1920), as noted in the company’s archival finding aid. The C&O acquired control of the AC&I in 1924 and leased it for operation on January 1, 1925; the property was conveyed outright to the C&O on December 19, 1933.

== Route ==
From riverfront Ashland the AC&I ran southwest via Princess and Coalton to Rush and Seaton (near Denton) along the Williams Creek valley; beyond Seaton it reached Hitchins over C&O trackage and Grayson over EK trackage. The line includes the 975 feet (297 m) Princess Tunnel at Coalton, constructed in the 1850s by the L&BS and later modified for modern clearances.

== Legacy ==
Segments of the former AC&I remain in use under CSX Transportation as part of the Ashland industrial trackage and connections to the former Lexington Subdivision; the Ashland–Princess corridor and the Princess Tunnel are still active freight infrastructure.

== See also ==
- Lexington and Big Sandy Railroad
- Elizabethtown, Lexington and Big Sandy Railroad
- Chesapeake and Ohio Railway
- Eastern Kentucky Railway
- C&O Lexington Subdivision
