= Polksville, Kentucky =

Unincorporated community in Kentucky, United States

- Unincorporated community
- Location within Kentucky
- Coordinates: 38°08′18″N 83°39′15″W
- Country: United States
- State: Kentucky
- County: Bath
- Elevation: 705 ft (215 m)
- Time zone: UTC-5 (Eastern (EST))
  - Summer (DST): UTC-4 (EDT)
- Area code: 606
- GNIS feature ID: 514678

Polksville is an unincorporated community in Bath County, Kentucky, United States. Polksville is located on U.S. Route 60 2.5 miles (4.0 km) northwest of Salt Lick.
