= Springfield Presbyterian Church =

Springfield Presbyterian Church may refer to:

- Springfield Presbyterian Church (Sharpsburg, Kentucky), listed on the National Register of Historic Places (NRHP)
- Springfield Presbyterian Church (Sykesville, Maryland), NRHP-listed
- Springfield Presbyterian Church (Springfield, New Jersey), NRHP-listed

== See also ==
- Third Presbyterian Church (Springfield, Ohio), NRHP-listed
