= Jeff Bond House =

Historic home in Kentucky, US

- U.S. National Register of Historic Places
- Location: Rt. 172, Red Bush, Kentucky
- Coordinates: 37°55′31″N 82°57′22″W
- Area: 0.5 acres (0.20 ha)
- Built: c.1890s
- Architectural style: Double pen
- MPS: Johnson County MRA
- NRHP reference No.: 88003174
- Added to NRHP: January 26, 1989

The Jeff Bond House, on Kentucky Route 172 in Red Bush, Kentucky Redbush, Kentucky was built in the 1890s. It was listed on the National Register of Historic Places in 1989.

It is a two-story five-bay house. It was built by Jeff Bond, a Civil War veteran and a drummer (salesman) for Kitchen and Witt.
