= Owingsville Commercial District and Courthouse Square =

Historic district in Kentucky, United States

- U.S. National Register of Historic Places
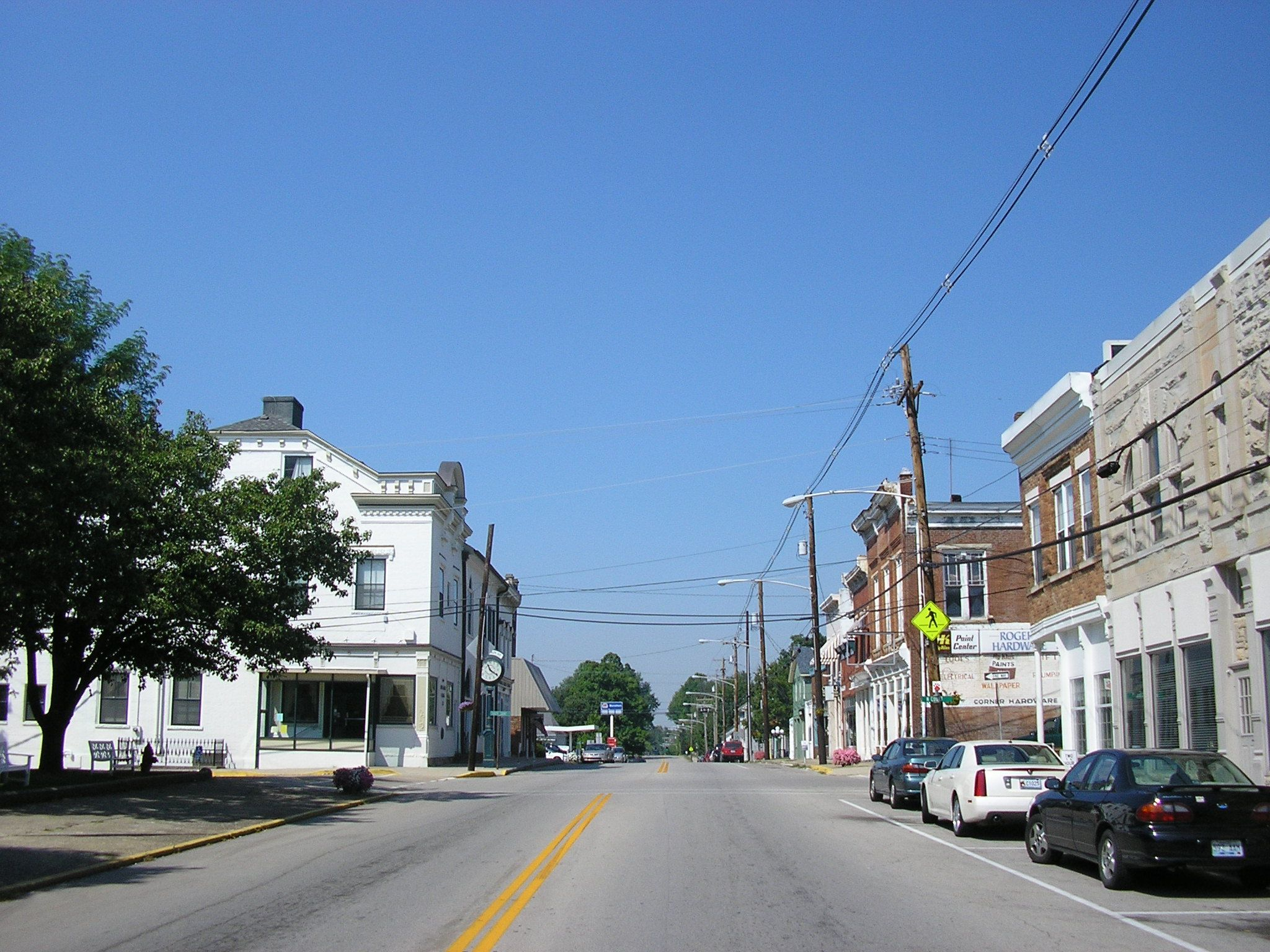

- Location within Kentucky Location within the United States
- Location: Main and Court Sts.; also 122 E. Main St., Owingsville, Kentucky
- Coordinates: 38°08′42″N 83°45′49″W
- Area: 8 acres (3.2 ha) (original) 0.2 acres (0.081 ha) (increase)
- Built: 1815
- Architectural style: Late Victorian, Italianate
- NRHP reference No.: 78001298 (original); 85001668 (increase)
- Added to NRHP: November 20, 1978; August 1, 1985

Owingsville Commercial District and Courthouse Square is a historic district in Owingsville, Kentucky which was listed on the National Register of Historic Places in 1978, and was expanded by a boundary increase listing in 1985.

The original listing was for 33 contributing buildings on 8 acres (3.2 ha). This includes:

- Methodist Church (1845)
- Colonel Thomas Deye Owings House (1811–14), separately listed on the National Register
- more

The increase was to add an Italianate-style building at 122 E. Main.
