= C&O Lexington Subdivision =

Former Chesapeake & Ohio Railway line in Kentucky

Lexington Subdivision
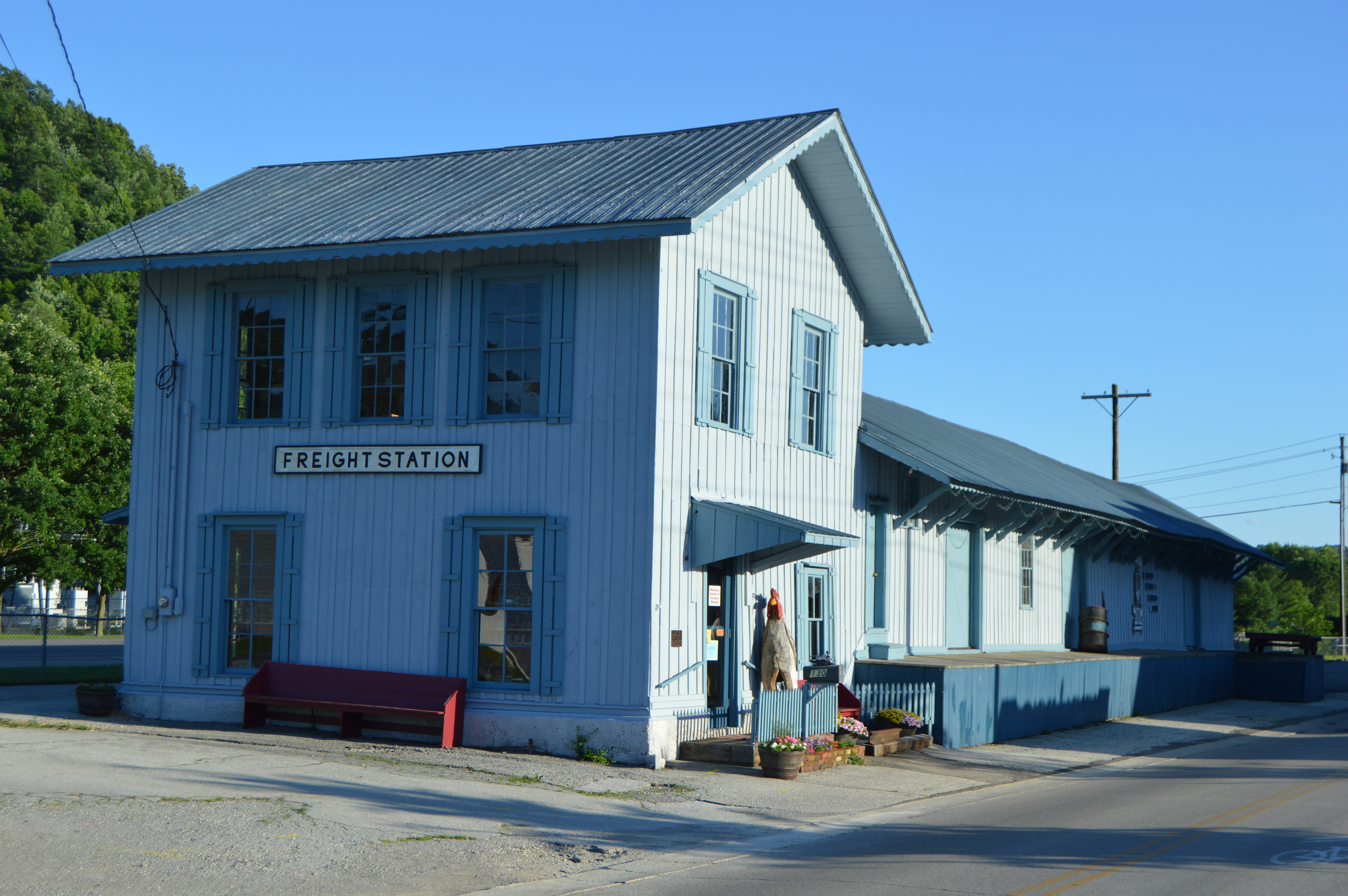

Overview
- Other name(s): C&O Lexington Subdivision
- Status: Mostly abandoned; Ashland–Coalton industrial stub active
- Owner: Chesapeake and Ohio Railway (later CSX Transportation)
- Locale: Kentucky, United States
- Termini: Ashland; Lexington
- Stations: (historic) Olive Hill; Morehead; Salt Lick; Olympia; Preston; Mt. Sterling; Winchester; Lexington

Service
- Operator(s): Chesapeake and Ohio Railway; later CSX Transportation (Ashland–Coalton)

History
- Opened: 1881
- Closed: 1985 (most of route)

Technical
- Line length: 109 mi (175 km)
- Character: Rural branch/main; tunnels and trestles
- Track gauge: 1,435 mm (4 ft 8 1/2 in)

The Lexington Subdivision was a Chesapeake & Ohio Railway (C&O) line between Ashland and Lexington in the U.S. state of Kentucky. Large sections were built by the Elizabethtown, Lexington and Big Sandy Railroad (EL&BS), successor to the Lexington and Big Sandy Railroad (L&BS); the C&O acquired the route in 1892. The line ran about 109 miles (175 km) across Boyd, Carter, Rowan, Bath, Montgomery, Clark, and Fayette counties.

The C&O maintained a large terminal at Lexington known as Netherland Yard (often rendered "Netherlands" in contemporary sources). Most of the right-of-way west of Ashland was removed in the mid-1980s. An eastern stub from Ashland to the Boyd–Carter county line remains to serve local industry and, for a time, municipal solid-waste trains to the Big Run Landfill.

== History ==
The L&BS was chartered in September 1852 to connect Lexington with the Big Sandy River near Catlettsburg. By 1857–58, about twelve miles were open from Ashland to Princess/Coalton, including the Princess Tunnel; the Panic of 1857 halted further work. The EL&BS was organized in 1869 and built west from Lexington to Mt. Sterling in 1872. In 1879–81, Collis P. Huntington’s Newport News and Mississippi Valley Railroad completed the central section; the last spike was driven near Denton in December 1881, opening the full Ashland–Lexington route. The NN&MV/EL&BS properties were consolidated into the C&O in 1892, after which the route appeared as the Lexington Subdivision.

Passenger service continued until the Amtrak era, ending on May 1, 1971, when Amtrak did not retain service over the subdivision.

== Route ==
From the C&O connection at Ashland, the line ran southwest along the East Fork of the Little Sandy through Princess and Coalton (Boyd County) to Olive Hill (Carter County), crossed to Morehead (Rowan County), then entered the Bluegrass via Salt Lick, Olympia, and Preston (Bath County) to Mt. Sterling (Montgomery County), Winchester (Clark County), and Lexington (Fayette County). At Morehead the subdivision interchanged with the Morehead and North Fork Railroad, which served timber, clay, and quarry operations south of town.

=== Route table (principal points) ===
Location	County	Notes
Ashland	Boyd	Junction with C&O mainline; east-end tunnels at Ashland and Princess
Princess / Coalton	Boyd	Clay/brick industries; later landfill and steel mill rail traffic
Olive Hill	Carter	Historic C&O depot (Prairie style); approach to Aden/Means tunnels
Morehead	Rowan	Freight depot (NRHP-listed); junction with Morehead and North Fork Railroad
Salt Lick	Bath	Main line through Bath County
Olympia	Bath	Connection with the narrow-gauge Owingsville & Olympia Railroad (1915–1918)
Preston	Bath	Agricultural shipments
Mt. Sterling	Montgomery	Bluegrass market town; beginning of denser population corridor
Winchester	Clark	Crossing/connection with L&N
Lexington (Netherland Yard)	Fayette	C&O division terminal; “Netherland—Lexington Yard” in timetables

== Engineering ==
The east–west alignment crossed north–south drainages, requiring tunnels and major trestles. Surviving bores include the Ashland and Princess (Eastham) tunnels at the east end and the Aden (Needle’s Eye) and Williams Creek (Means) tunnels between Olive Hill and Morehead. The Ashland and Princess tunnels date to 1881; in 2013 CSX raised clearances at Princess by notching and relining to accommodate taller equipment.

== Operations ==
Freight east of Mt. Sterling historically included timber, stone, clay/brick, and modest coal; westward the Bluegrass generated agricultural shipments. Netherland Yard (Lexington) functioned as the division terminal; C&O employee timetables list “Netherland—Lexington Yard.”

== Decline and abandonment ==
Resource depletion, highway competition (notably US 60 and later I-64), and system rationalization reduced traffic after mid-century. Most of the Lexington Subdivision between Winchester and the Ashland area was authorized for abandonment in 1984–85 and removed soon after; track between Winchester and Lexington had already been lifted earlier in the decade.

An east-end stub between Ashland and Coalton remained to serve Kentucky Electric Steel and other local customers. In 2005 a three-track yard was added to handle municipal-solid-waste trains to the Big Run Landfill; to support taller equipment, CSX increased clearances at the Ashland and Princess tunnels (2013). A 2015 agreement required the landfill to end out-of-state rail deliveries by mid-2016, and Big Run shut its rail operation in April 2016.

== Relationship to the Eastern Kentucky Railway ==
Grayson was on the separate Eastern Kentucky Railway (EK), which ran Webbville–Grayson–Riverton (now Greenup) and connected with the EL&BS/C&O via a junction at Hitchins. The Lexington Subdivision itself did not serve Grayson.

== Legacy ==
Physical remnants—tunnels, embankments, culverts, and depots—remain along the route. The former C&O depots at Olive Hill and the Morehead freight depot (NRHP-listed) document the line’s architectural and commercial history.

== Gallery ==
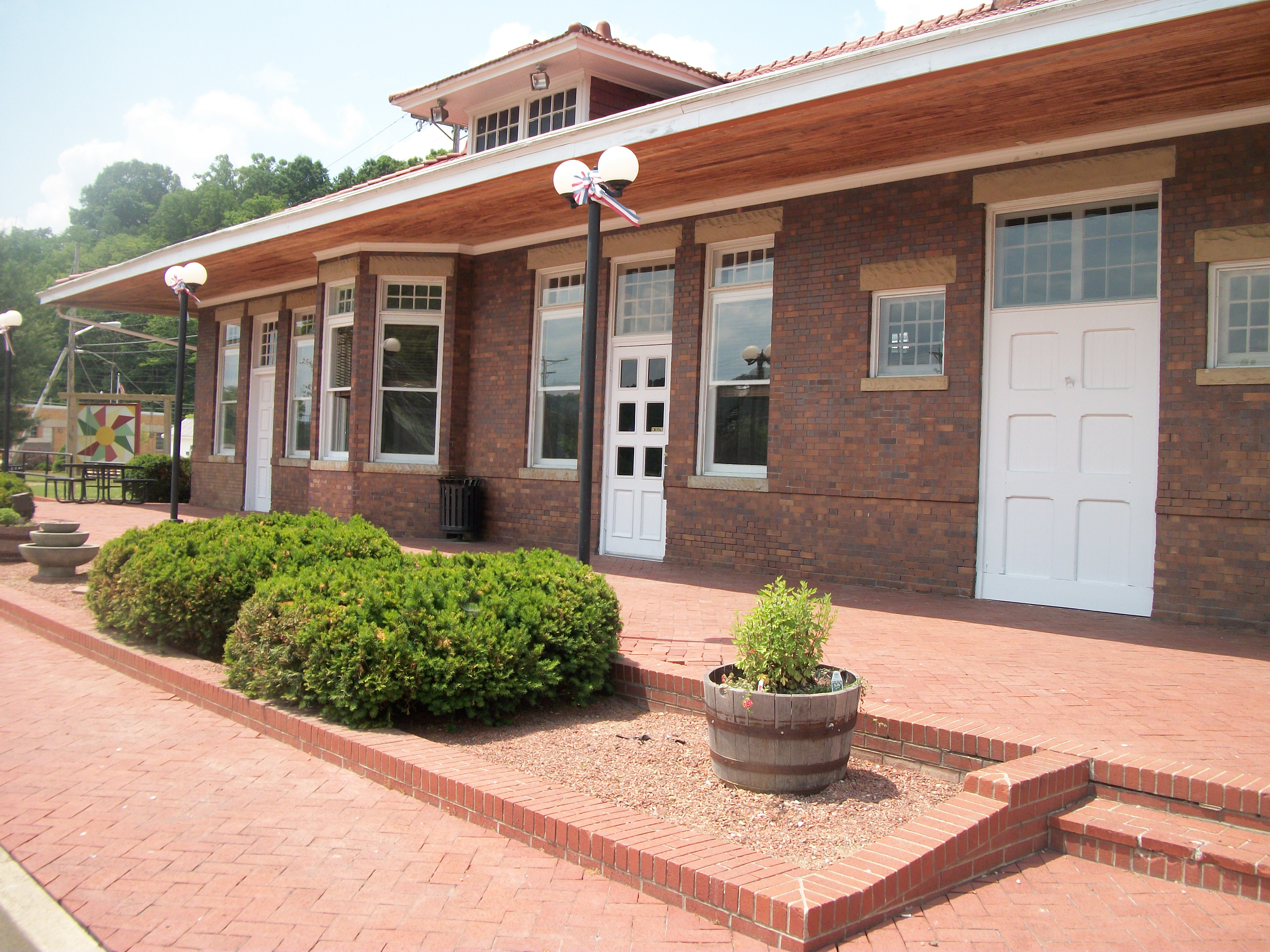
Olive Hill C&O passenger depot (Carter County)

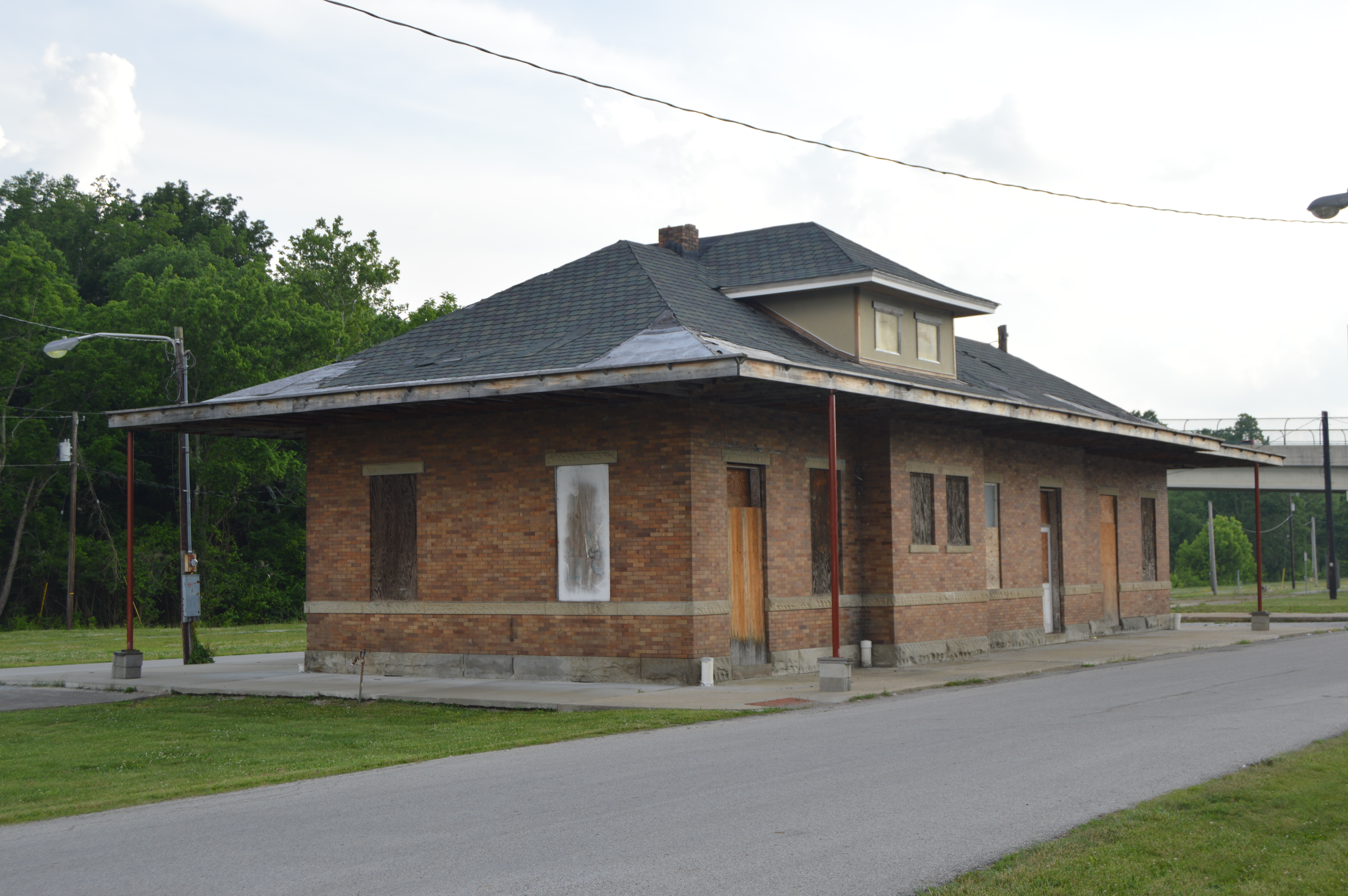
Former C&O depot (Mount Sterling, Montgomery County)

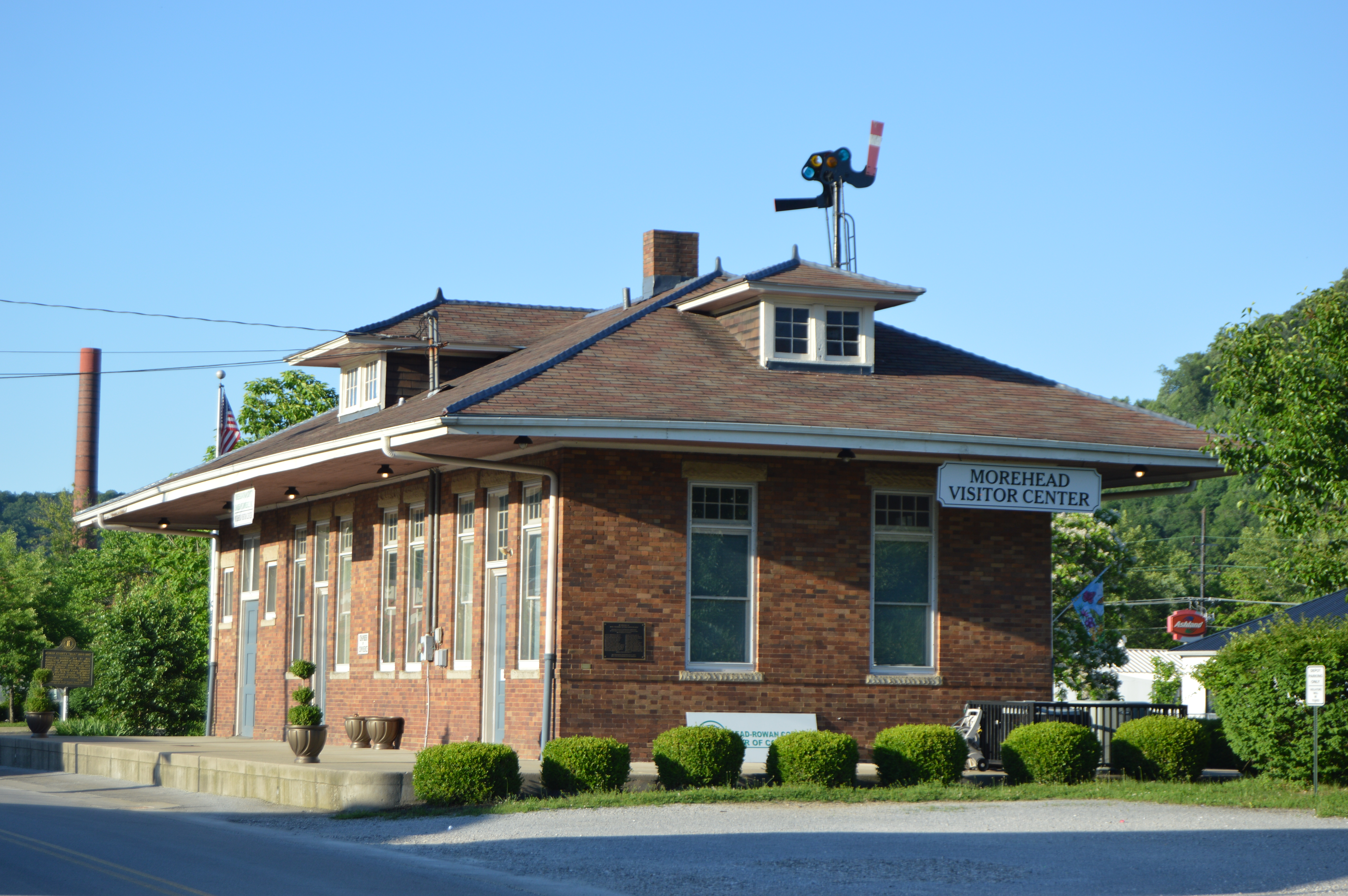
Morehead C&O passenger depot (now visitor center)
