= Confederate Monument in Owingsville =

- U.S. National Register of Historic Places
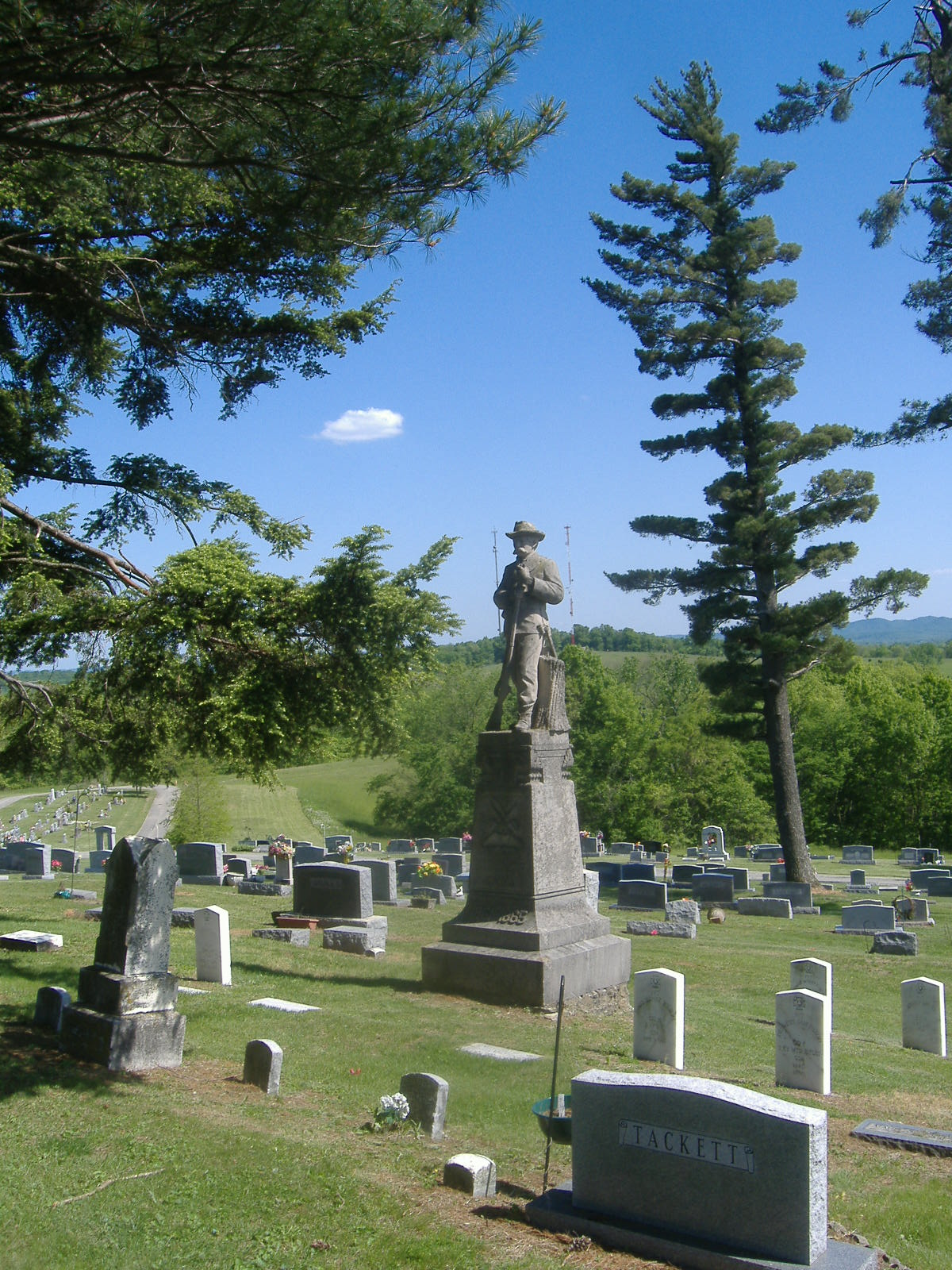

- Location within Kentucky Location within the United States
- Location: E of Owingsville, 1.5 mi. S of US 60, Owingsville, Kentucky
- Built: 1907
- MPS: Civil War Monuments of Kentucky MPS
- NRHP reference No.: 97000718
- Added to NRHP: July 17, 1997

The Confederate Monument in Owingsville in Bath County, Kentucky, near Owingsville, Kentucky, commemorates the Confederate soldiers who hailed from Bath County. It is located in Owingsville Cemetery.

On July 17, 1997, the Confederate Monument in Owingsville was one of sixty-one different monuments related to the Civil War in Kentucky placed on the National Register of Historic Places, as part of the Civil War Monuments of Kentucky Multiple Property Submission.

== Gallery ==
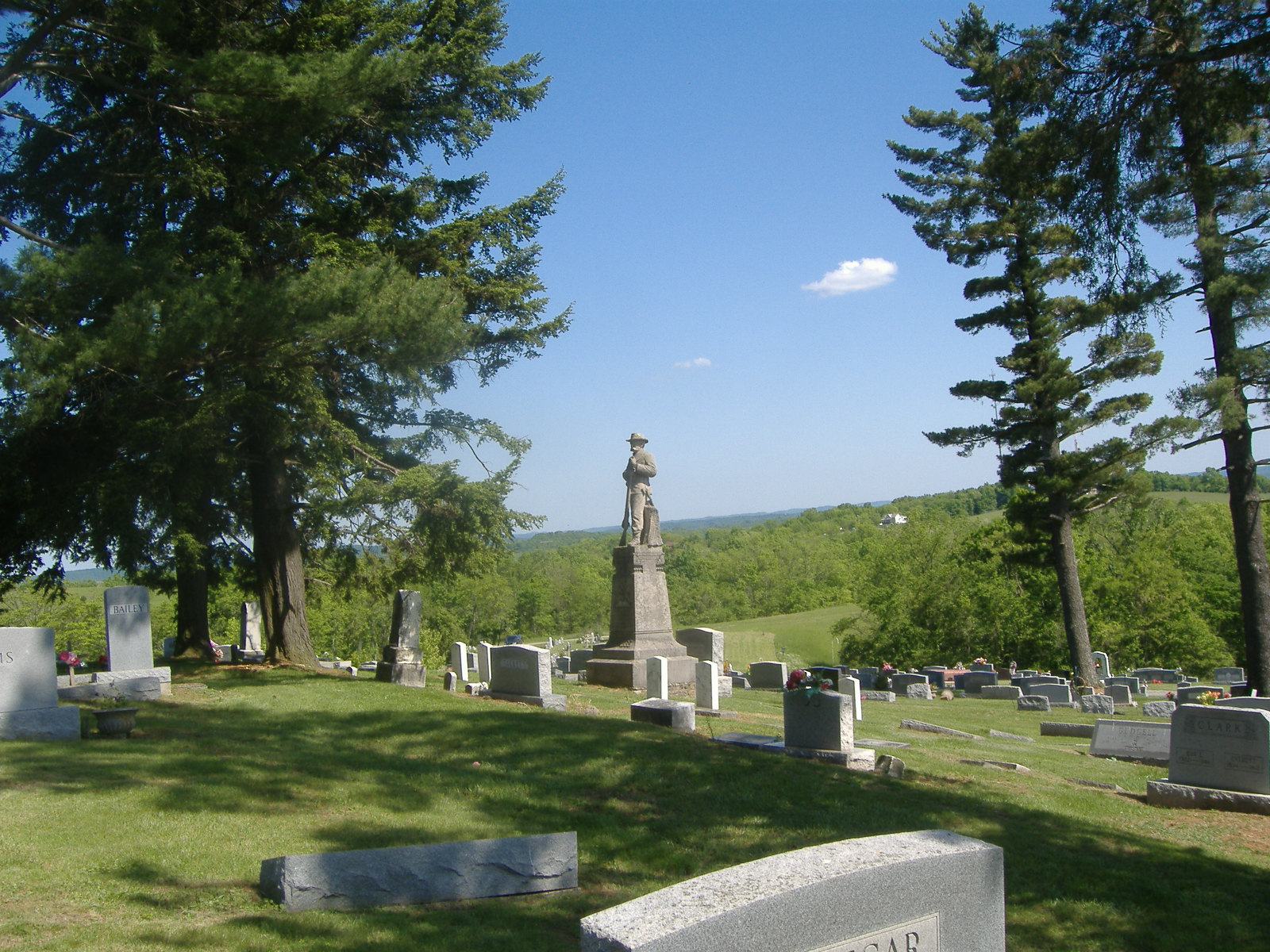
