= Red bush (disambiguation) =

Red bush may refer to:

- Rooibos, a type of plant
- Red Bush, Kentucky
- Redbush, Kentucky
