= Bourbon Iron Works =

- U.S. National Register of Historic Places
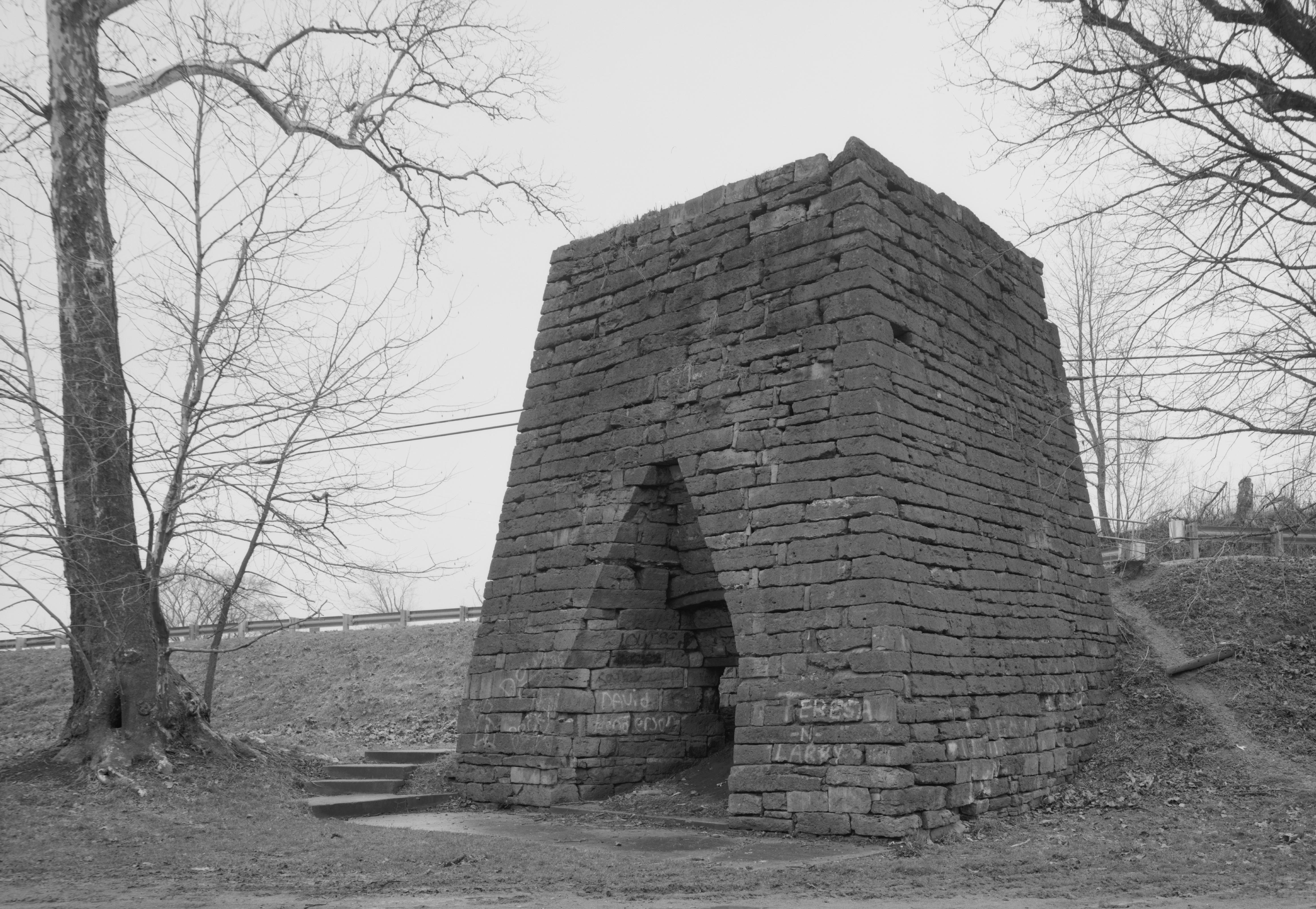

- Location within Kentucky Location within the United States
- Location: 2.6 miles (4.2 km) south of Owingsville, Kentucky on Kentucky Route 36
- Coordinates: 38°06′51″N 83°44′53″W
- Area: 2 acres (0.81 ha)
- Built: 1791
- Built by: Myers, Jacob
- NRHP reference No.: 76000844
- Added to NRHP: September 1, 1976

The Bourbon Iron Works, near Owingsville in Bath County, Kentucky, date from 1791. The works was listed on the National Register of Historic Places in 1976.

It was the first of six blast furnaces built in this area for the smelting of iron ore. Only the blast furnace stack survives.
