= Lexington and Big Sandy Railroad =

Antebellum Kentucky railroad that became the basis of the C&O Lexington Subdivision

Overview
- Headquarters: Lexington, Kentucky
- Reporting mark: L&BS
- Locale: Kentucky (Fayette, Clark, Montgomery, Bath, Rowan, Carter, Boyd; built segment in Boyd)
- Dates of operation: 1852–1869
- Successor: Elizabethtown, Lexington and Big Sandy Railroad

The Lexington and Big Sandy Railroad (L&BS) was a standard-gauge railroad chartered in 1852 to connect Lexington with the Big Sandy River near Catlettsburg (later revised to Ashland).

Before the Panic of 1857 halted further work, the company opened roughly 10 to 12 miles (16 to 19 km) west from Ashland to Princess/Coalton, including the 975 feet (297 m) Princess Tunnel. Financial reversals left the project incomplete. In 1869, investors organized the Elizabethtown, Lexington and Big Sandy Railroad (EL&BS) as successor to the L&BS and began completing the central gap toward Lexington.

By 1881, the through route via Mt. Sterling, Morehead, and Olive Hill reached Ashland; EL&BS was the first railroad through Rowan County and was completed there in 1881. Between 1880 and 1892, the C&O leased and then purchased the EL&BS, operating it thereafter as the Lexington Subdivision.

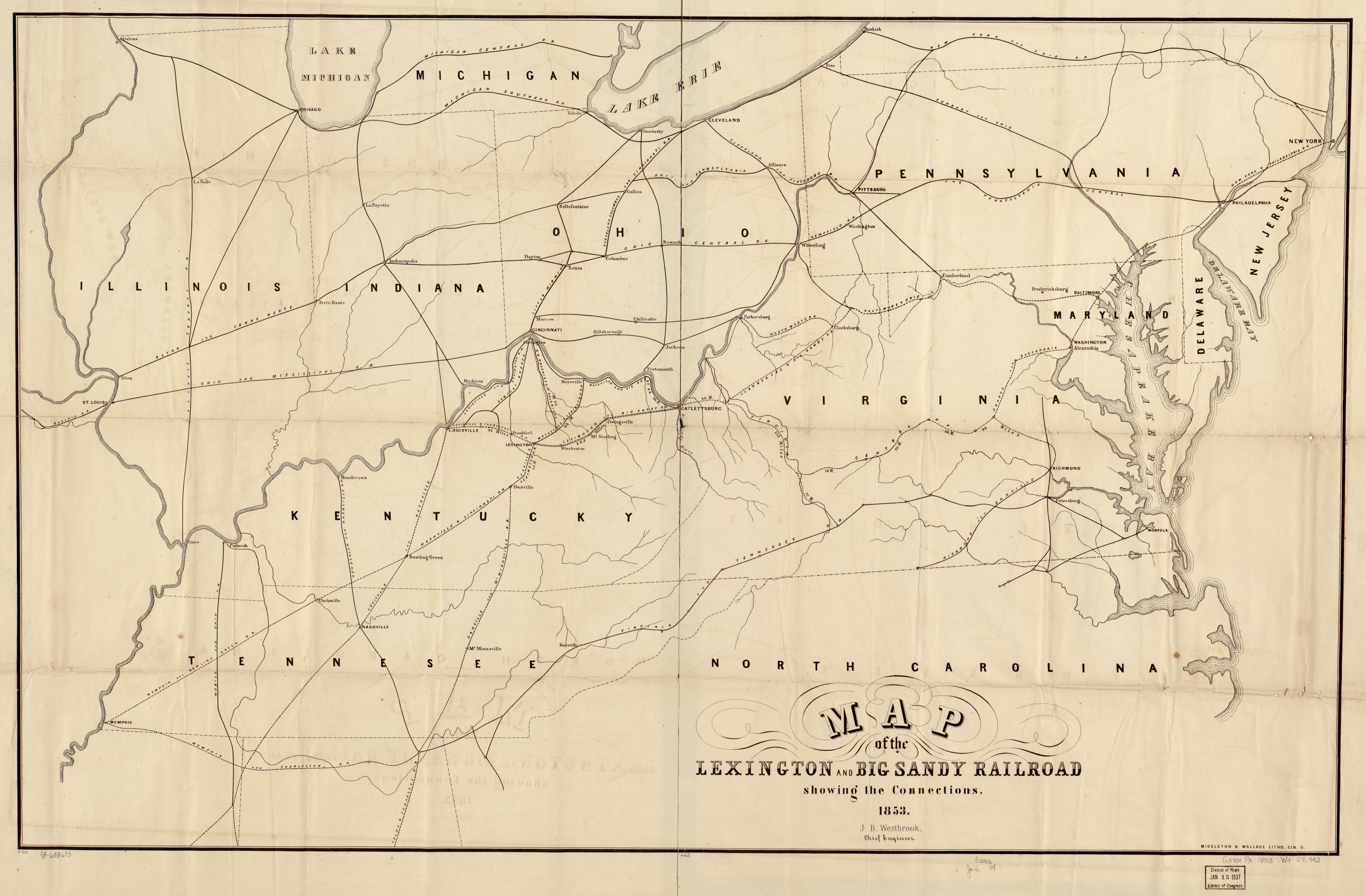
An 1853 promotional map for the L&BS prepared by J. B. Westbrook (Library of Congress).

== History ==
=== Charter and early construction (1852–1858) ===
The Kentucky legislature chartered the L&BS in 1852 to build from Lexington to the Big Sandy. Construction progressed on the eastern end: by 1857–1858 about a dozen miles from Ashland to Princess/Coalton were in service, including the Princess Tunnel, before the financial panic checked expansion.

=== Reorganization and completion (1869–1881) ===
Following the war, the enterprise was reorganized in 1869 as the Elizabethtown, Lexington and Big Sandy Railroad. The eastern works (Ashland–Princess–Coalton) continued as the L&BS’s Eastern Division and were later renamed the Ashland Coal & Iron Railway (March 31, 1881). The Lexington–Ashland route was finished in stages and was open through Rowan County by 1881.

=== Absorption into the C&O ===
Between 1880 and 1892 the C&O leased and then purchased the EL&BS (including the former L&BS works) and operated the corridor as its Lexington Subdivision.

== Route ==
The original L&BS charter envisioned a line from Lexington across the Bluegrass and the Eastern Kentucky uplands to the Big Sandy. The portion actually built by the L&BS company proper lay in Boyd County from Ashland through Princess to Coalton; successors extended the line west through Carter and Rowan (Morehead) and across Bath, Montgomery (Mt. Sterling), and Clark (Winchester) to Lexington.

== Legacy ==
Although the L&BS corporate life ended with the 1869 reorganization, its works—especially the Ashland–Princess–Coalton segment and the Princess Tunnel—became the eastern anchor of the Lexington–Ashland corridor finished in 1881, later the C&O’s Lexington Subdivision.

== See also ==
- Elizabethtown, Lexington and Big Sandy Railroad
- Ashland Coal and Iron Railway
- C&O Lexington Subdivision
