= Shrout =

Shrout may refer to:

- Shrout, Kentucky, an unincorporated community located in Bath County
- Jason Shrout, an American drummer
