= Upper Prickly Ash, Kentucky =

Unincorporated community in Kentucky, United States

Upper Prickly Ash
- Unincorporated community
- Location within the state of Kentucky Upper Prickly Ash (the United States)
- Coordinates: 38°9′49″N 83°48′14″W
- Country: United States
- State: Kentucky
- County: Bath
- Elevation: 883 ft (269 m)
- Time zone: UTC-5 (Eastern (EST))
  - Summer (DST): UTC-4 (EDT)
- GNIS feature ID: 2416515

Upper Prickly Ash is an unincorporated community in Bath County, Kentucky, United States.
