= Kentucky meat shower =

Event in 1876

- Date: March 3, 1876
- Time: 11 a.m. – 12 p.m.
- Duration: Several minutes
- Location: Bath County, Kentucky, U.S.
- Cause: Inconclusive, possibly regurgitating vultures

The Kentucky meat shower was an incident that occurred for a period of several minutes between 11 a.m. and 12 noon on March 3, 1876, where what appeared to be chunks of red meat fell from the sky in a 100-by-50-yard (90-by-45-meter) area near Olympia Springs in Bath County, Kentucky, United States. There exist several explanations (from blood rain to vulture ejecta) as to how this occurred and what the "meat" was. Although the exact type of meat was never identified, various reports suggested it was beef, lamb, deer, bear, or horse.

Despite various theories, the exact cause of the Kentucky meat shower remains a subject of speculation and mystery.

== Incident ==
On March 3, 1876, a farmer's wife, Mrs. Crouch, was making soap on her porch when she reported seeing a piece of meat fall from the sky. She said she was 40 steps from her house when the meat began to hit the ground. Mrs. Crouch and her husband believed the event was a sign from God. Mrs. Crouch is on record saying that it was "snowing meat" and that "the meat fell with a snapping-like noise when it struck." Joe Jordan, a grocer in the area stated that "the smell was offensive to the extreme, like that of a dead body." The phenomenon was covered by Scientific American, The New York Times, and other publications.

Most of the pieces of meat were approximately 2 by 2 inches (5 cm × 5 cm); at least one was 4 by 4 inches (10 cm × 10 cm). The meat appeared to be beef, but according to the first report in Scientific American, two men who tasted it judged it to be possibly lamb or deer. Writing in the Sanitarian, Leopold Brandeis identified the substance as Nostoc, a type of cyanobacteria. Brandeis gave the meat sample to the Newark Scientific Association for further analysis, leading to a letter from Dr. Allan McLane Hamilton appearing in the Medical Record and stating the meat had been identified as lung tissue from either a horse or a human infant, "the structure of the organ in these two cases being almost identical." The composition of this sample was backed up by further analysis, with two samples of the meat being identified as lung tissue, three as muscle, and two as cartilage.

Brandeis's Nostoc theory relied on the fact that Nostoc expands into a clear jelly-like mass when rain falls on it, often giving the sense that it was falling with the rain. Charles Fort noted in his first book, The Book of the Damned, that there had been no rain. Another theory found by Kurt Gohde, a professor at Transylvania University, came from a humorist for The New York Times who asserted that it was "cosmic meat", that the meat came from animals from an exploding planet. Locals favored the explanation that the meat was vomited up by either black or turkey vultures, common in Kentucky, "who, as is their custom, seeing one of their companions disgorge himself, immediately followed suit." Dr. Lewis D. Kastenbine presented this theory in the contemporaneous Louisville Medical News as the best explanation of the variety of meat. Vultures vomit as part of making a quick escape and also as a defensive method when threatened. Fort explained the flattened, dry appearance of the meat chunks as the result of pressure, and noted that nine days later, on March 12, 1876, red "corpuscles" with a "vegetable" appearance fell over London, Kentucky.

== Meat sample ==
In 2004, a meat sample from the event was rediscovered in storage at Transylvania University by art professor Kurt Ghode when he was conducting a collections cleanout. It has been in various exhibitions since this finding.

The piece of meat is primarily housed in its long term repository at the Moosnick Medical and Science Museum at Transylvania University in Lexington, Kentucky. The sample is submerged in alcohol, contained within a small glass vial, which has a label with the faded words "Olympia Springs" written on the front. It is widely believed to be the last known surviving sample from the event.

The rediscovered specimen has also been the focus of later scientific and artistic experiments. After the vial was catalogued, Gohde arranged for modern DNA analysis of the tissue, but the age and condition of the sample meant that the tests could not identify a specific species.

== Scientific analysis ==
In the weeks after the meat shower, local officials and physicians collected pieces of the material and sent them to chemists and microscopists in Kentucky, Ohio and New York for examination. Early commentators, including chemist J. Lawrence Smith and water analyst Leopold Brandeis, proposed that the substance might be wind-blown frog spawn or the cyanobacterium Nostoc, drawing analogies to other reported "flesh" or "blood" rains. Both men nonetheless preserved their samples and passed them on to other investigators.

Microscopic analysis by Allan McLane Hamilton, J. W. S. Arnold, Arthur Mead Edwards, and several colleagues shifted the emerging consensus toward an animal origin. Hamilton and Arnold described structures consistent with mammalian lung tissue and reported their findings in the Medical Record, while later papers in the American Journal of Microscopy and Popular Science and related journals discussed additional specimens containing striated muscle, cartilage, and connective tissue. Later popular-science summaries have generally followed these nineteenth-century reports in describing the material as a mixture of lung, muscle, and cartilage rather than algae or amphibian eggs.

When a preserved specimen was rediscovered at Transylvania University in 2004, art professor Kurt Gohde arranged for modern genetic testing; however, the sample was found to be too old and contaminated to yield a conclusive species identification. As a result, while laboratory work has strongly supported the conclusion that animal tissue fell during the Kentucky meat shower, the exact species involved and the precise circumstances that produced the event remain uncertain.

== Bath County History Museum ==
In 2024, the Bath County History Museum opened a temporary exhibit for the Kentucky meat shower, showcasing the preserved piece from the event. Bath County started an annual festival in remembrance of the event. On the 149th anniversary in 2025, a festival attracted nearly 500 visitors, featuring exhibits, food vendors, and a mystery-meat chili cook off.

== Relation to animal rain phenomenon ==
The Kentucky meat shower has been compared to other rare meteorological events such as animal rain. Animal rain is when small animals, such as frogs or fish, fall from the sky during storms or strong updrafts that lift the animals into the atmosphere and drop them miles away. A modern example of an animal rain event happened in Honduras in 1998 where multiple weeks after a big storm, fish and frogs rained on the city of Yoro.

== Theories ==
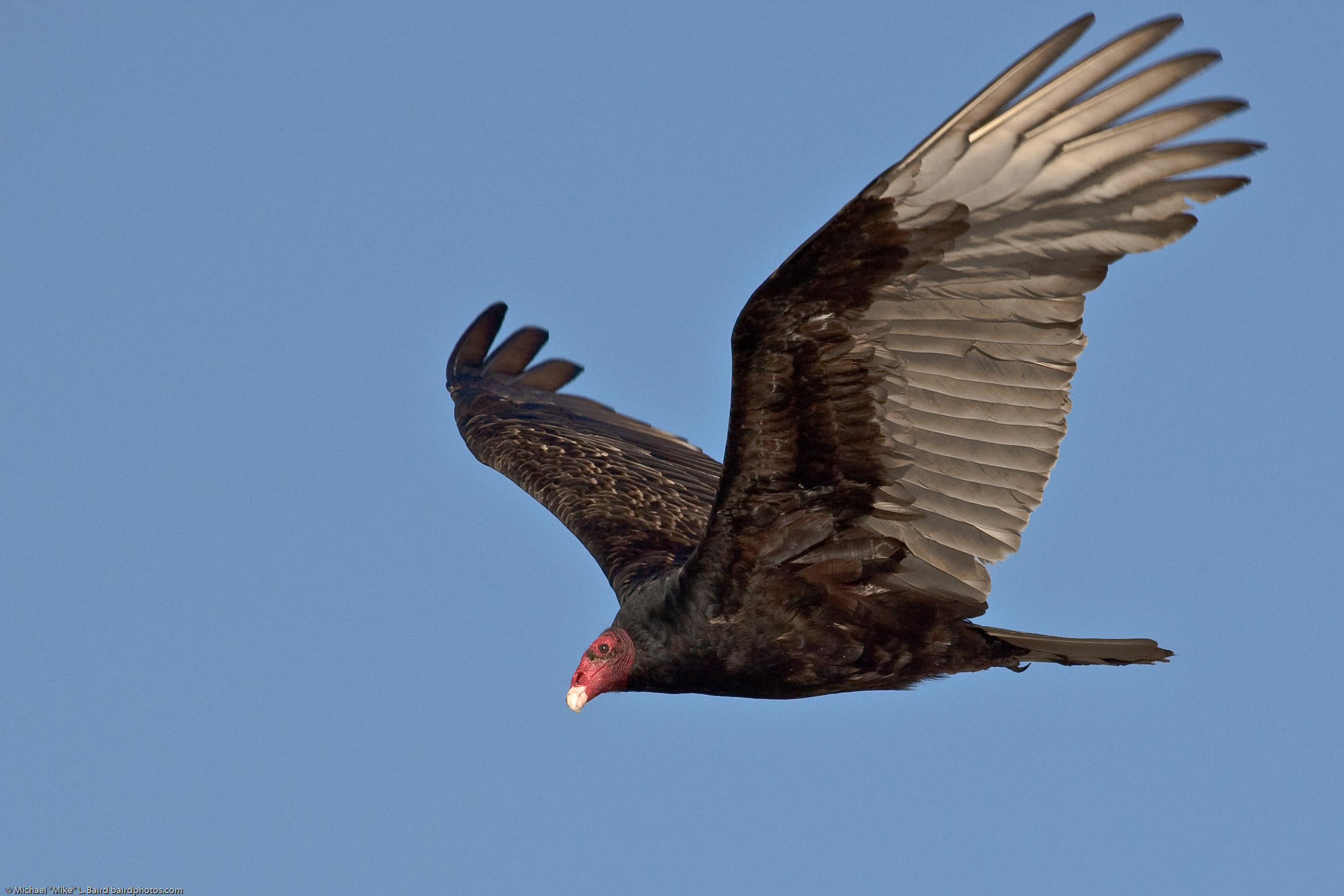
A turkey vulture (Cathartes aura), a species proposed as a possible source of the falling meat.

Vulture regurgitation is one of the earliest and most widely cited explanations for the Kentucky meat shower. One of the earliest explanations for the Kentucky meat shower was proposed by physician L. D. Kastenbine in an 1876 article in The Louisville Medical News. Kastenbine suggested that the meat had been regurgitated by a flock of vultures flying overhead, noting that both black vultures and turkey vultures are common in Kentucky and are known to vomit partially digested food when startled or threatened. The vulture regurgitation hypothesis has been widely repeated in later accounts of the incident. A 2014 article in Scientific American described it as the most plausible explanation, arguing that the size and distribution of the meat pieces are consistent with carrion ejected from vultures in flight. Although the exact circumstances of the event remain uncertain, the vulture theory is often treated as the leading scientific explanation for the meat shower.

The Nostoc hypothesis was proposed around the same time by chemist Leopold Brandeis, who examined a sample of the material and suggested that it was Nostoc, a jelly-like cyanobacterium that swells up when wet and can sometimes look like it has "fallen" from the sky after rain. Later, microscopic studies reported to the Newark Scientific Association and in medical journals said the pieces looked like lung tissue, muscle, and cartilage instead, which does not fit with a cyanobacteria explanation.

Cosmic meat explanations appear in some later discussions of the incident. Nineteenth-century humorist William Livingston Alden suggested in a New York Times column that compared it to a meteor shower, stating that the Kentucky event might have been caused by "cosmic meat" or exploded animal matter drifting through space. Modern accounts generally describe this proposal as a satirical response rather than a serious scientific hypothesis.

== Media coverage and cultural references ==
The Kentucky meat shower has been featured in a variety of modern media as an example of bizarre or unexplained history. It is the subject of an episode of the comedy history podcast The Dollop and of the science podcast Skeptoid, both of which retell the 1876 accounts and discuss the competing explanations, especially the vulture-regurgitation theory.

The event has also appeared in short documentary-style videos and popular history articles that highlight it as a "weird news" story, including an episode of the YouTube channel Weird History and a segment on the public television series Kentucky Life.

In addition to non-fiction coverage, the meat shower has inspired a number of creative works. In 2018, Louisville history educator and podcaster Mick Sullivan published a children's book titled The Meat Shower, which imagines what might have happened on the Crouch farm and introduces the event to young readers. The incident continues to appear in regional folklore podcasts like Haunted Hollers and in a 2022 "ShortHand" episode of the true-crime podcast RedHanded, which groups it with other so-called "meat-eorological" phenomena.
