= Ore Mines, Kentucky =

Unincorporated community in Kentucky, United States

Ore Mines
- Unincorporated community
- Location within the state of Kentucky Ore Mines (the United States)
- Coordinates: 38°8′18″N 83°41′1″W
- Country: United States
- State: Kentucky
- County: Bath
- Elevation: 778 ft (237 m)
- Time zone: UTC-6 (Central (CST))
  - Summer (DST): UTC-5 (CST)
- GNIS feature ID: 2416464

Ore Mines is an unincorporated community located in Bath County, Kentucky, United States.
