= Stepstone, Kentucky =

Unincorporated community in Kentucky, United States

- Unincorporated community
- Location within Kentucky Location within the United States
- Coordinates: 38°5′16″N 83°49′45″W
- Country: United States
- State: Kentucky
- County: Bath, Montgomery
- Elevation: 784 ft (239 m)
- Time zone: UTC-5 (Eastern (EST))
  - Summer (DST): UTC-4 (EDT)
- GNIS feature ID: 509126

Stepstone is an unincorporated community on the border of Montgomery County, Kentucky, and Bath County, Kentucky, United States. Its post office closed in 1931, after being open for nearly 50 years.

== Stepstone Railroad ==
In the Annual Report of the Railroad Commissioners of Kentucky, Volume 30, on November 26, 1908, one mile west of Stepstone, Kentucky., 9:00am, Nelsey Bailey, colored, age 14, single, while attempting to board extra 222 west, freight train, fell under the train, was run over and fatally injured. He later died at 1:30pm on the same day.
