= Bald Eagle, Kentucky =

Unincorporated community in Kentucky, United States

Bald Eagle
- Unincorporated community
- Location within the state of Kentucky Bald Eagle (the United States)
- Coordinates: 38°12′4″N 83°51′5″W
- Country: United States
- State: Kentucky
- County: Bath
- Elevation: 791 ft (241 m)
- Time zone: UTC-6 (Central (CST))
  - Summer (DST): UTC-5 (CST)
- GNIS feature ID: 2416373

Bald Eagle is an unincorporated community located in Bath County, Kentucky, United States.
