= Raccoon John Smith House =

Historic house in Kentucky, United States

- "Raccoon" John Smith House
- U.S. National Register of Historic Places
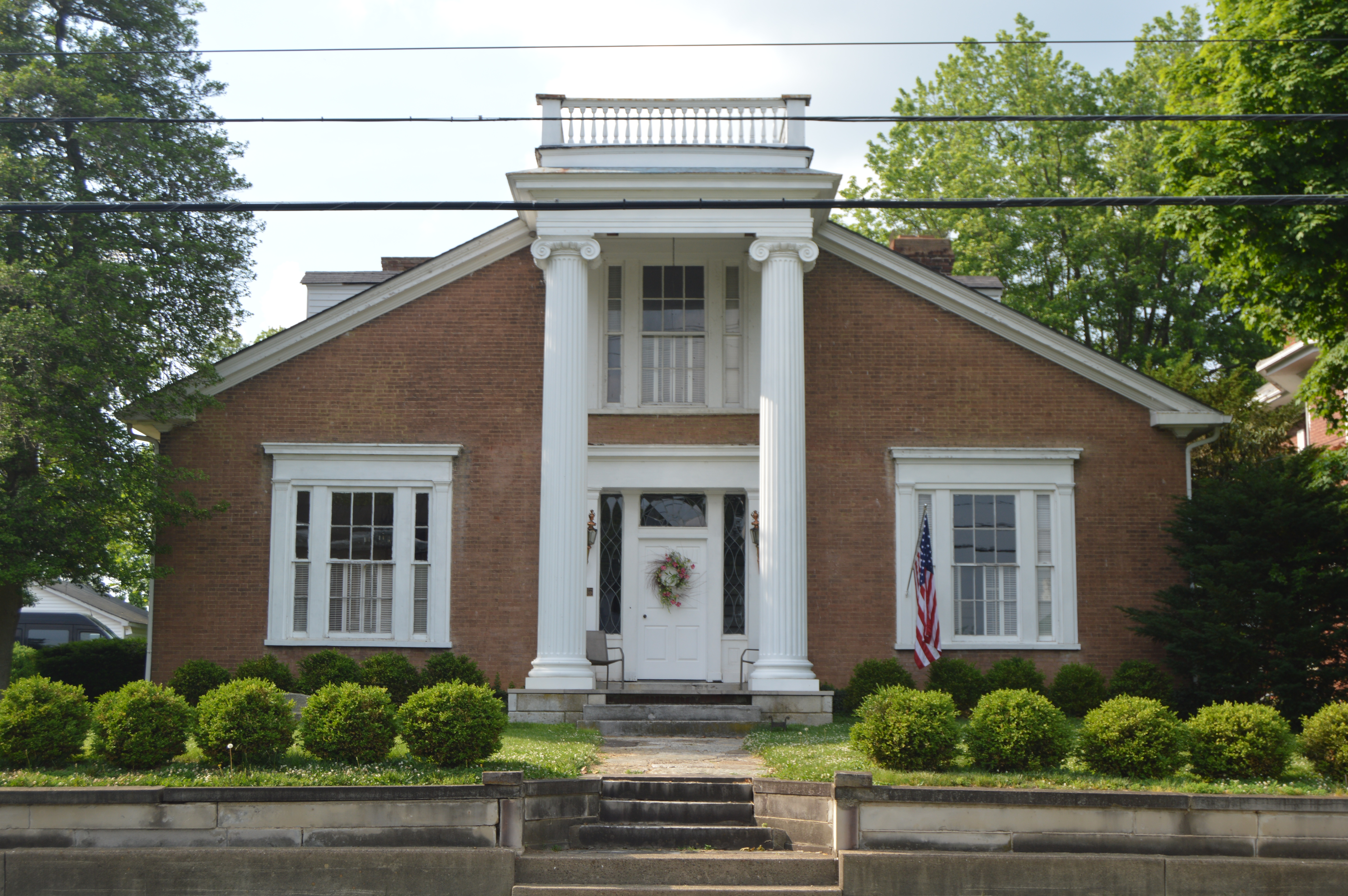

- Location within Kentucky Location within the United States
- Location: Address Restricted, Owingsville, Kentucky
- Coordinates: 38°08′39″N 83°46′07″W
- Area: 1 acre (0.40 ha)
- Built: 1839
- Built by: Gillig, John T.
- Architectural style: Greek Revival, Front Gabled Type
- NRHP reference No.: 12000445
- Added to NRHP: August 6, 2012

The "Raccoon" John Smith House in Owingsville, Kentucky was built in 1839. It was listed on the National Register of Historic Places in 2012.

It was a home of "Raccoon" John Smith.

It is listed as "address restricted" in the NRIS database, but at 250 W. Main St. in its Inventory/Nomination document. The NRHP nomination document is not publicly available at the National Park Service and is recorded as being "Fully restricted" at NARA.

It has also been known as the J.A.J. Lee House and denoted as BH-0-4.
