= Myrtle Hill (Bath County, Kentucky) =

- U.S. National Register of Historic Places
- Location within Kentucky Location within the United States
- Location: Off U.S. Route 64 south of Owingsville, Kentucky
- Coordinates: 38°07′21″N 83°47′03″W
- Area: 1.7 acres (0.69 ha)
- Built: 1815
- Architectural style: Federal
- NRHP reference No.: 82001550
- Added to NRHP: October 29, 1982

Myrtle Hill, located near Owingsville, Kentucky, is a Federal-style house and outbuildings dating from 1815. It was listed on the National Register of Historic Places in 1982. The listing includes four contributing buildings.

The main house is a one-and-a-half-story brick residence.
