= J.J. Nesbitt House =

Historic house in Kentucky, United States

- U.S. National Register of Historic Places
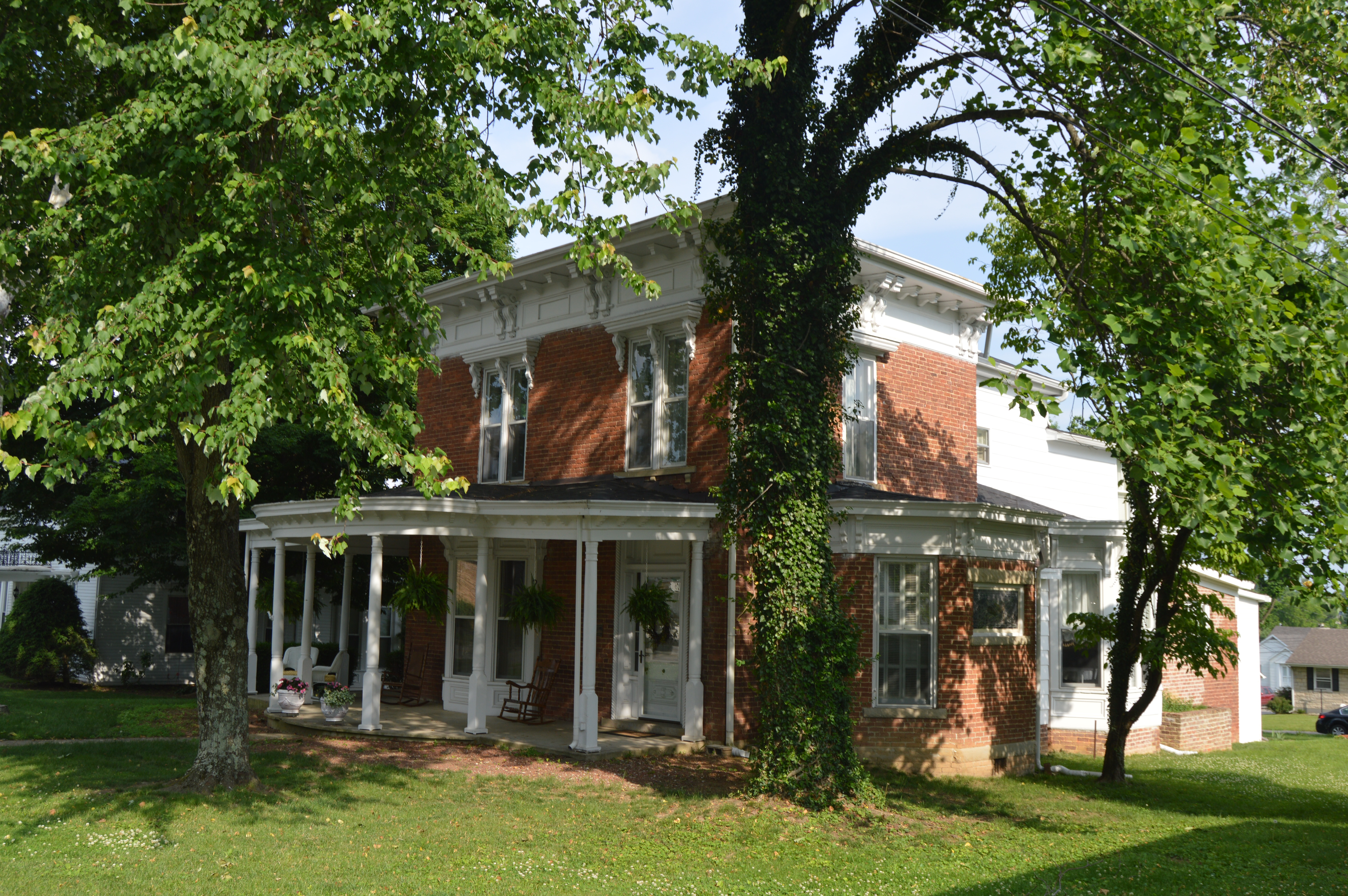

- Location within Kentucky Location within the United States
- Location: 233 W. Main St., Owingsville, Kentucky
- Coordinates: 38°08′39″N 83°46′04″W
- Built: 1876-78
- NRHP reference No.: 10000532
- Added to NRHP: August 5, 2010

The J.J. Nesbitt House, at 233 W. Main St. in Owingsville, Kentucky, was listed on the National Register of Historic Places in 2010.

It was built during 1876-78 and is mainly Italianate in style.
