= Peasticks, Kentucky =

Unincorporated community in Kentucky, United States

Peasticks
- Unincorporated community
- Location within the state of Kentucky Peasticks (the United States)
- Coordinates: 38°9′22″N 83°41′56″W
- Country: United States
- State: Kentucky
- County: Bath
- Elevation: 869 ft (265 m)
- Time zone: UTC-5 (Eastern (EST))
  - Summer (DST): UTC-4 (EST)
- GNIS feature ID: 514473

Peasticks is an unincorporated community located in Bath County, Kentucky, United States.
