= Newport News and Mississippi Valley Railroad =

1880s holding/operating company for Collis P. Huntington's eastern rail interests

Overview
- Headquarters: Chartered in Connecticut; operating offices in Washington, D.C.
- Reporting mark: NN&MV
- Locale: Virginia, West Virginia, Kentucky, Tennessee
- Dates of operation: 1884–1894

The Newport News and Mississippi Valley Railroad—legally the Newport News & Mississippi Valley Company (NN&MV)—was a Connecticut corporation created by industrialist Collis P. Huntington to consolidate and operate his eastern railroad properties in the 1880s. Chartered by a Connecticut act on March 27, 1884 as the Southern Pacific Railroad Company and renamed Newport News & Mississippi Valley Company on March 10, 1885, it was empowered to own or lease railways outside Connecticut.

In 1886 NN&MV executed very long-term leases of the Elizabethtown, Lexington and Big Sandy Railroad (Kentucky) and the Chesapeake & Ohio Railway (Virginia), while separately leasing the Chesapeake, Ohio and Southwestern Railroad (CO&SW) in the west; contemporary marketing styled the combined lines the “Mississippi Valley Route.”

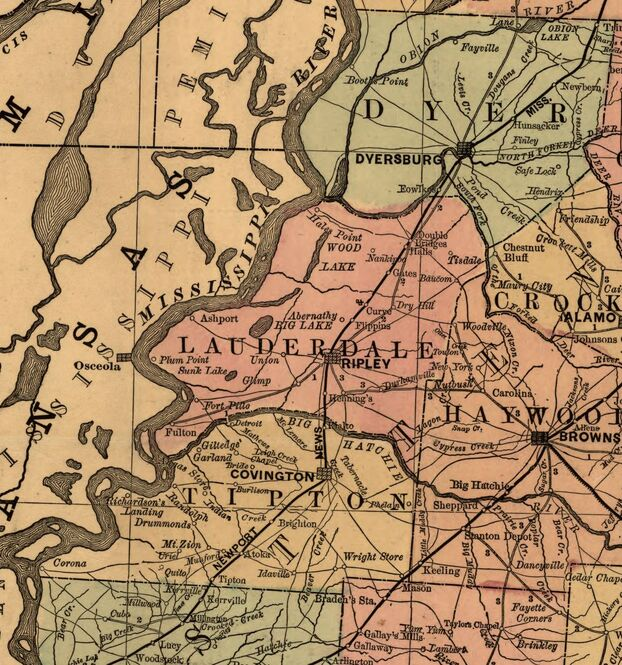
Rand McNally Tennessee map (1888) marking the Newport News & Mississippi Valley RR across Tipton and Lauderdale counties (Commons).

== History ==
=== Formation and purpose (1884–1885) ===
Huntington, seeking unified management of his eastern properties, obtained a special Connecticut charter (Mar. 27, 1884) for the Southern Pacific Railroad Company (no operations allowed inside Connecticut) and in 1885 renamed it the Newport News & Mississippi Valley Company. The U.S. Supreme Court later described NN&MV as Huntington’s device to bring several roads “under one management,” with ticketing and advertising continuing under the well-known C&O brand.

=== Leases and operations (1886–1893) ===
On January 29, 1886 the EL&BS leased its line to NN&MV for 250 years (effective February 1, 1886). On June 15, 1886 the Virginia C&O similarly leased its line to NN&MV for 250 years (effective July 1, 1886). Despite these instruments, day-to-day operations continued to the public as the “Chesapeake & Ohio Route,” reflecting Huntington’s integrated management.

In the west NN&MV leased the Chesapeake, Ohio and Southwestern Railroad (CO&SW) for fifty years beginning January 1886 and operated it until the lease was canceled on July 23, 1893; the CO&SW then operated under its own management until it entered receivership on December 22, 1893. In Memphis, Huntington opened Poplar Street Station (1891), advertised as a “union depot” used by NN&MV and the Louisville, New Orleans and Texas Railway (LNO&T), reflecting close coordination of the “Mississippi Valley Route.”

NN&MV appears frequently in contemporaneous litigation as an operating/holding entity for interstate service over C&O, EL&BS and CO&SW lines.

=== Wind-up and aftermath (1893–1894) ===
After canceling the CO&SW lease, NN&MV and C. P. Huntington jointly conveyed securities and property to the Illinois Central on November 27, 1893, realizing about $900,000 for the company. On March 16, 1894 NN&MV stockholders voted to wind up the company; on March 20, 1894 a Connecticut court opened a winding-up proceeding and appointed a receiver (Edmund Zacher). The Supreme Court’s account likewise notes that the Connecticut corporation later “disappeared,” with properties reverting to the C&O as reorganizations proceeded.

== Legacy ==
The NN&MV served as a transitional overlay in Huntington’s east-of-the-Mississippi system. The EL&BS and C&O leases helped integrate the Lexington–Ashland corridor into the C&O network, while western properties (CO&SW) ultimately passed to the Illinois Central through foreclosure and purchase in the mid-1890s; parts of the CO&SW’s former main line are now the Paducah and Louisville Railway.

== See also ==
- Chesapeake and Ohio Railway
- Elizabethtown, Lexington and Big Sandy Railroad
- Chesapeake, Ohio and Southwestern Railroad
- Louisville, New Orleans and Texas Railway
