= Olympia, Kentucky =

Unincorporated community in Kentucky, United States

- Unincorporated community
- Location within Kentucky Location within the United States
- Coordinates: 38°05′53″N 83°41′45″W
- Country: United States
- State: Kentucky
- County: Bath
- Elevation: 761 ft (232 m)
- Time zone: UTC-5 (Eastern (EST))
  - Summer (DST): UTC-4 (EDT)
- ZIP code: 40358
- Area code: 606
- GNIS feature ID: 514351

Olympia is an unincorporated community in Bath County, Kentucky, United States. The community is located along Kentucky Route 36 5 miles (8.0 km) southeast of Owingsville. Olympia has a post office with ZIP code 40358.

Olympia is near the site of the 1876 Kentucky meat shower.
