= Preston, Kentucky =

Unincorporated community in Kentucky, United States

Coordinates: 38.086°N 83.753°W

Preston is an unincorporated community in Bath County, Kentucky, United States. Its elevation is 758 feet and it is in the Eastern Time Zone. Preston's zip code is 40366.
