= Red Bush, Kentucky =

Unincorporated community in Kentucky, United States

- Unincorporated community
- Location within Kentucky
- Coordinates: 38°11′01″N 83°41′02″W
- Country: United States
- State: Kentucky
- County: Bath
- Elevation: 814 ft (248 m)
- Time zone: UTC-5 (Eastern (EST))
  - Summer (DST): UTC-4 (EDT)
- Area code: 606
- GNIS feature ID: 2416488

Red Bush is an unincorporated community in Bath County, Kentucky, United States. Red Bush is located on Water Dell Road 5.1 miles (8.2 km) east-northeast of Owingsville.
