= Ramey Mound =

- U.S. National Register of Historic Places
- Ramey Mound in 2026

- Location within Kentucky Location within the United States
- Location: Ramey Road, 0.5 miles (0.80 km) north of Sharpsburg, Kentucky
- Coordinates: 38°12′27″N 83°55′51″W
- Area: Less than 1 acre (0.40 ha)
- NRHP reference No.: 98000089
- Added to NRHP: February 12, 1998

The Ramey Mound, designated 15BH1, is an archaeological site in Bath County in the northeastern part of the U.S. state of Kentucky. Built by people of the prehistoric Adena culture, the site has been known for more than two centuries; it was recorded in 1807 as consisting of an enclosure at least 3 feet (0.91 m) high. In 1871, another survey observed four mounds in association with the main earthwork: one was located just east of the enclosure, another directly to the west, a larger one to the southeast, and a small one to the southwest. The source of a nearby brook lies within the site and traverses the enclosure; the 1871 survey supposed that it had been dug to provide earth for the enclosure. By the time of this later survey, cultivation had reduced the earthwork to the point that it was nearly indistinguishable.

The Ramey Mound was also observed by the Kentucky Geological Survey under the direction of John Robert Procter, who marked numerous Bath County earthworks on his topographic maps of the county. By 1932, despite the damage of the plow, locals observed that it could still be distinguished from the surrounding terrain. The mound's name is shared with Emma Ramey, who owned it in 1932. In 1998, the mound was listed on the National Register of Historic Places because of its archaeological significance; it is Bath County's only archaeological site on the Register.
