= Morehead and North Fork Railroad =

Defunct short line railroad in northeastern Kentucky

Overview
- Headquarters: Morehead, Kentucky
- Reporting mark: M&NF
- Locale: Rowan and Morgan counties, Kentucky
- Dates of operation: 1905–1973
- Predecessor: Morehead and West Liberty Railroad
- Successor: Morehead and Morgan Fork Railroad

Technical
- Length: 24.2 mi (original); ~4 mi after 1933

The Morehead and North Fork Railroad (reporting mark M&NF) was a standard-gauge short line in northeastern Kentucky that connected 24 miles (39 km) from Morehead on the C&O southward to Redwine in Morgan County. Built to move timber for the Clearfield Lumber Company and later refractory clay for Lee Clay Products, the M&NF was cut back during the Great Depression to a roughly 4 miles (6.4 km) remnant between the C&O junction at Morehead and the mines at Clack Mountain. Regular service ended in 1973; the last isolated trackage was removed in 2001.

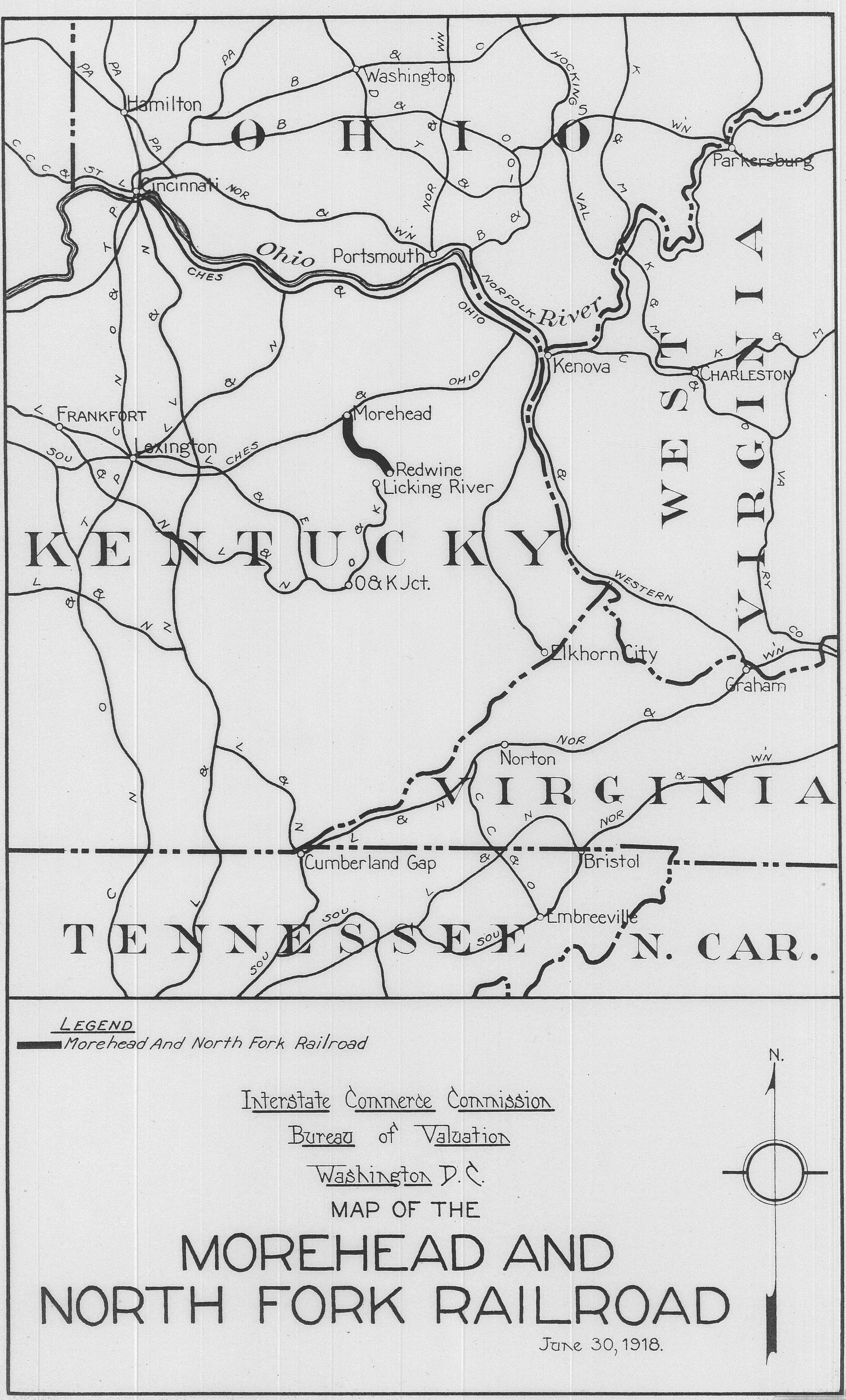
System index map from the ICC valuation series (c. 1915–1920).

== History ==
The M&NF was incorporated in 1905 and opened from Morehead to Redwine in 1908, totaling 24.219 miles (38.977 km) of main track plus 3.861 miles (6.214 km) of yards and sidings, according to Interstate Commerce Commission valuation tallies. The line interchanged with the C&O's Lexington Subdivision at Morehead and was built primarily to move hardwood logs and lumber from Clearfield and points south.

By the early 1920s local timber was exhausted and Clearfield Lumber closed (1922). In 1925 the Lee Clay Products Company opened on the former mill site at Clearfield and became the line's principal shipper, receiving clay mined at Clack Mountain over the M&NF.

During its peak years the railroad handled multiple daily trains and operated two daily passenger round trips. In 1926 it added an Edwards gasoline motor car nicknamed the “Blue Goose” for the Morehead–Redwine run; the car was sold in 1934 to the California Western (later Skunk Train).

Traffic collapsed in the Depression, and in 1933 the southern 21 miles (34 km) between Clack Mountain and Redwine were dismantled, leaving about 4 miles (6.4 km) between the C&O junction and Clack Mountain. Engineering works on the surviving segment included the all-timber-lined 1,334 feet (407 m) Clack Mountain tunnel and the Wrigley “Twin Tunnels” arch at Poppin Rock (35 feet (11 m) span).

Steam remained in use into the postwar era, with the railroad's last regular steam day on April 1, 1963. Thereafter the M&NF used second-hand Baldwin RS-12 diesels acquired from the Durham & Southern.

Lee Clay Products closed in 1970. The property and trackage were sold to private owners and continued for a time as the Morehead & Morgan Fork Railroad serving a lumber operation on the former brick-plant site. A kiln fire in April 1982 ended remaining freight prospects. After the C&O main line through Morehead was lifted in 1985, the short line was isolated; it lay dormant until the remaining track was removed in June 2001.

== Route ==
From the C&O junction at Morehead the M&NF ran south through Clearfield to Clack Mountain, with the original line continuing to Wrigley, Lenox, and Redwine in Morgan County. The railroad's ICC valuation map set, preserved by the U.S. National Archives, documents the alignment, bridges, and tunnels.

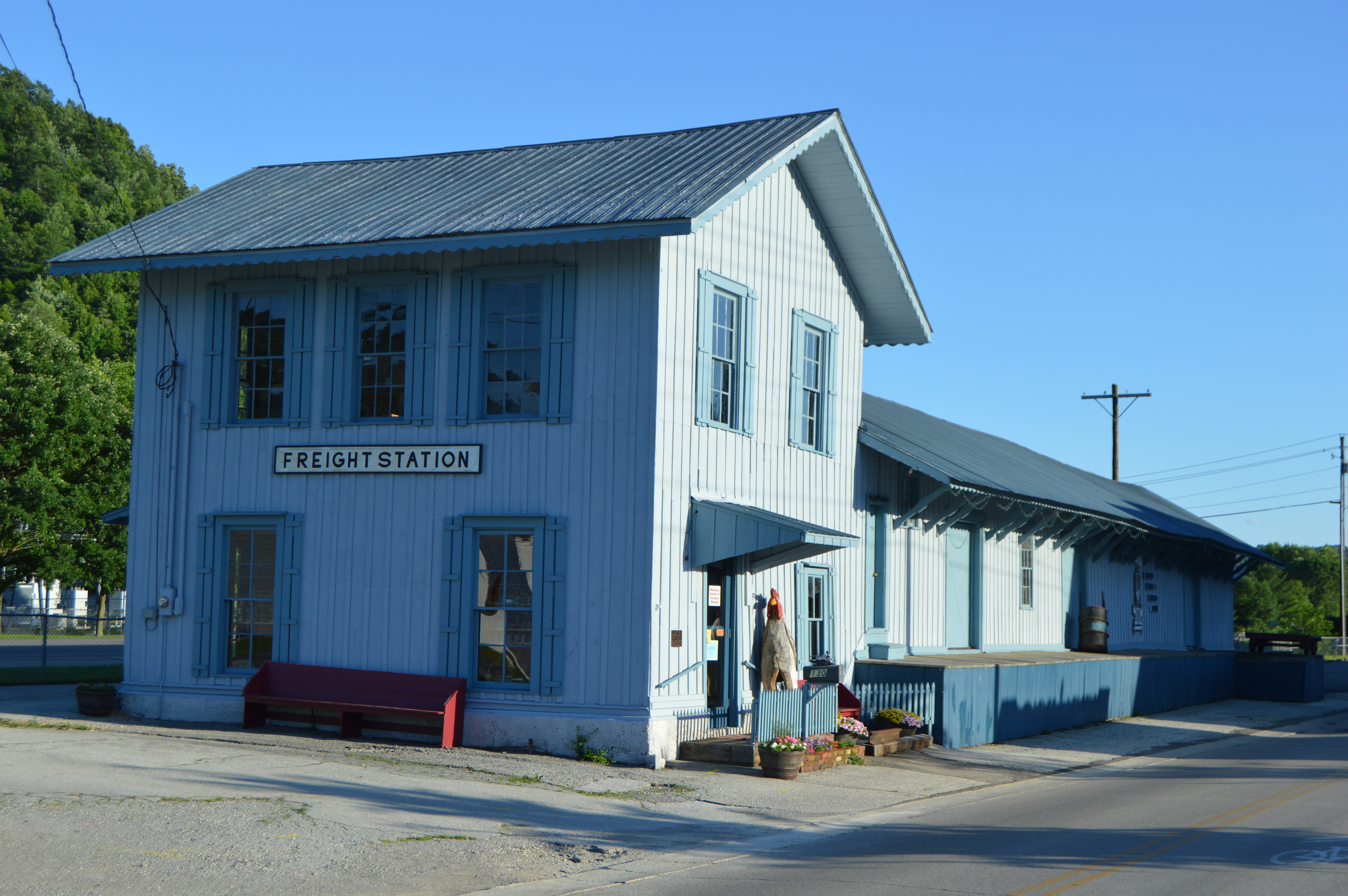
The C&O freight depot (NRHP) at Morehead, where the M&NF interchanged.

== Equipment and preservation ==
The M&NF rostered small steam locomotives for switching and short-haul freight, including 0-6-0 No. 12 (ex-Southern Railway 1643, ALCO 1905). No. 12 is preserved and operational at the Age of Steam Roundhouse in Sugarcreek, Ohio. After 1963 the line employed used Baldwin RS-12 road-switchers sourced from the Durham & Southern.

== Termination ==
Corporate records from the Morehead State University archives indicate that President Roy Cassity closed the M&NF in 1973, ending about 70 years of operation; the last isolated trackage was removed in 2001.

== Legacy ==
The former C&O freight depot at Morehead—adjacent to the M&NF connection—is listed on the National Register of Historic Places. The Morehead History & Railroad Museum preserves local railroad artifacts and imagery; Morehead State University holds a dedicated M&NF photograph collection.

== See also ==
- C&O Lexington Subdivision
- California Western Railroad
