= Thomas Deye Owings House =

Historic house in Kentucky, United States

- Col. Thomas Deye Owings House
- U.S. National Register of Historic Places
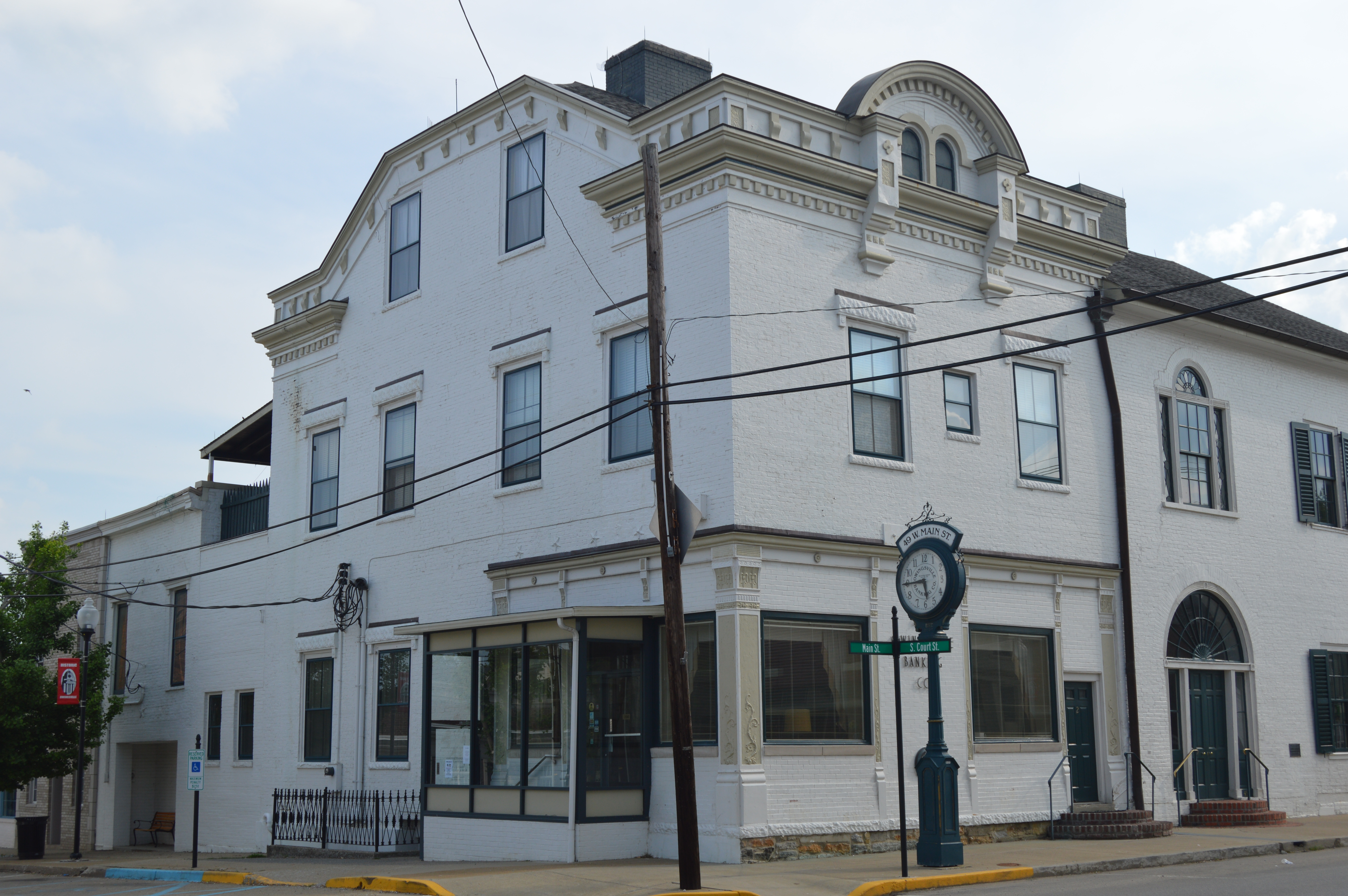

- Location within Kentucky Location within the United States
- Location: Main St. and Courthouse Sq., Owingsville, Kentucky
- Coordinates: 38°08′40″N 83°45′54″W
- Area: 0.4 acres (0.16 ha)
- Built: 1811–14
- NRHP reference No.: 78001297
- Added to NRHP: January 9, 1978

The Col. Thomas Deye Owings House, at Main St. and Courthouse Sq. in Owingsville, Kentucky, was built during 1811–14. It was listed on the National Register of Historic Places in 1978.

It has also served as a hotel and as a bank, and has been known as the Owings House and as the Owingsville Banking Company Building

It is a prominent building whose design has traditionally been attributed to famous architect Benjamin Latrobe.
