= Shrout, Kentucky =

Unincorporated community in Kentucky, United States

Shrout
- Unincorporated community
- Location within the state of Kentucky Shrout (the United States)
- Coordinates: 38°8′10″N 83°40′42″W
- Country: United States
- State: Kentucky
- County: Bath
- Elevation: 761 ft (232 m)
- Time zone: UTC-6 (Central (CST))
  - Summer (DST): UTC-5 (CST)
- GNIS feature ID: 2416501

Shrout is an unincorporated community located in Bath County, Kentucky, United States.
