= Salt Lick, Kentucky =

- City
- Location of Salt Lick in Bath County, Kentucky.
- Coordinates: 38°07′10″N 83°36′56″W
- Country: United States
- State: Kentucky
- County: Bath
- Incorporated: 1888
- Named for: Nearby salt licks

Area
  - Total: 0.79 sq mi (2.05 km^{2})
  - Land: 0.78 sq mi (2.02 km^{2})
  - Water: 0.0077 sq mi (0.02 km^{2})
- Elevation: 673 ft (205 m)

Population (2020)
  - Total: 247
  - Density: 316.1/sq mi (122.05/km^{2})
- Time zone: UTC-5 (Eastern (EST))
  - Summer (DST): UTC-4 (EDT)
- ZIP code: 40371
- Area code: 606
- FIPS code: 21-68160
- GNIS feature ID: 2405408

Salt Lick is a home rule-class city in Bath County, Kentucky, in the United States. The population was 247 at the 2020 U.S. census.

== History ==
The community at the present site of Salt Lick was originally named Vail when the first post office was established in 1882. The town was laid out and renamed in 1884; the post office followed suit four years later after the city was formally incorporated.

== Geography ==
Salt Lick is located at the intersection of US 60 and KY 211 beside the Licking River. It is part of the Mount Sterling micropolitan area. According to the United States Census Bureau, the city has a total area of 0.77 square miles (2.0 km^{2}), of which 0.008 square miles (0.02 km^{2}), or 1.15%, is water.

== Demographics ==
Historical population
Census	Pop.	Note	%±
1890	150		—
1910	532		—
1920	518		−2.6%
1930	475		−8.3%
1940	498		4.8%
1950	488		−2.0%
1960	370		−24.2%
1970	441		19.2%
1980	347		−21.3%
1990	342		−1.4%
2000	342		0.0%
2010	303		−11.4%
2020	247		−18.5%
U.S. Decennial Census

As of the census of 2000, there were 342 people, 130 households, and 89 families residing in the city. The population density was 437.6 inhabitants per square mile (169.0/km^{2}). There were 157 housing units at an average density of 200.9 per square mile (77.6/km^{2}). The racial makeup of the city was 99.12% White, 0.58% Native American, and 0.29% from two or more races.

There were 130 households, out of which 35.4% had children under the age of 18 living with them, 56.9% were married couples living together, 10.0% had a female householder with no husband present, and 30.8% were non-families. 23.8% of all households were made up of individuals, and 9.2% had someone living alone who was 65 years of age or older. The average household size was 2.63 and the average family size was 3.21.

In the city, the population was spread out, with 30.1% under the age of 18, 5.3% from 18 to 24, 32.2% from 25 to 44, 19.6% from 45 to 64, and 12.9% who were 65 years of age or older. The median age was 35 years. For every 100 females, there were 102.4 males. For every 100 females age 18 and over, there were 102.5 males.

The median income for a household in the city was $26,042, and the median income for a family was $27,159. Males had a median income of $35,313 versus $24,643 for females. The per capita income for the city was $10,584. About 16.1% of families and 26.4% of the population were below the poverty line, including 36.4% of those under age 18 and 15.4% of those age 65 or over. As of the census[2] of 2000, there were 342 people, 130 households, and 89 families residing in the city. The population density was 437.6 inhabitants per square mile (169.0/km^{2}). There were 157 housing units at an average density of 200.9 per square mile (77.6/km^{2}). The racial makeup of the city was 99.12% White, 0.58% Native American, and 0.29% from two or more races.

There were 130 households, out of which 35.4% had children under the age of 18 living with them, 56.9% were married couples living together, 10.0% had a female householder with no husband present, and 30.8% were non-families. 23.8% of all households were made up of individuals, and 9.2% had someone living alone who was 65 years of age or older. The average household size was 2.63 and the average family size was 3.21.

In the city, the population was spread out, with 30.1% under the age of 18, 5.3% from 18 to 24, 32.2% from 25 to 44, 19.6% from 45 to 64, and 12.9% who were 65 years of age or older. The median age was 35 years. For every 100 females, there were 102.4 males. For every 100 females age 18 and over, there were 102.5 males.

The median income for a household in the city was $26,042, and the median income for a family was $27,159. Males had a median income of $35,313 versus $24,643 for females. The per capita income for the city was $10,584. About 16.1% of families and 26.4% of the population were below the poverty line, including 36.4% of those under age 18 and 15.4% of those age 65 or over.
