= Springfield Presbyterian Church (Sharpsburg, Kentucky) =

Historic church in Kentucky, United States

- U.S. National Register of Historic Places
- Location within Kentucky Location within the United States
- Nearest city: Sharpsburg, Kentucky
- Coordinates: 38°8′56″N 83°54′13″W
- Area: 3 acres (1.2 ha)
- Built: 1821
- Architect: Graves, Thomas
- Architectural style: Greek Revival
- NRHP reference No.: 79000959
- Added to NRHP: April 26, 1979

Springfield Presbyterian Church is a historic church in Sharpsburg, Kentucky. It was built in 1821 and added to the National Register of Historic Places in 1979.

In 1932, an archaeological site, 15BH13, was recorded in the vicinity of the church: a local resident reported finding stone box graves in a field near the church. These are typical of some burials by ancient indigenous peoples of the region.

== See also ==
- National Register of Historic Places listings in Kentucky
