= Bath County, Kentucky =

County in Kentucky, United States

- County
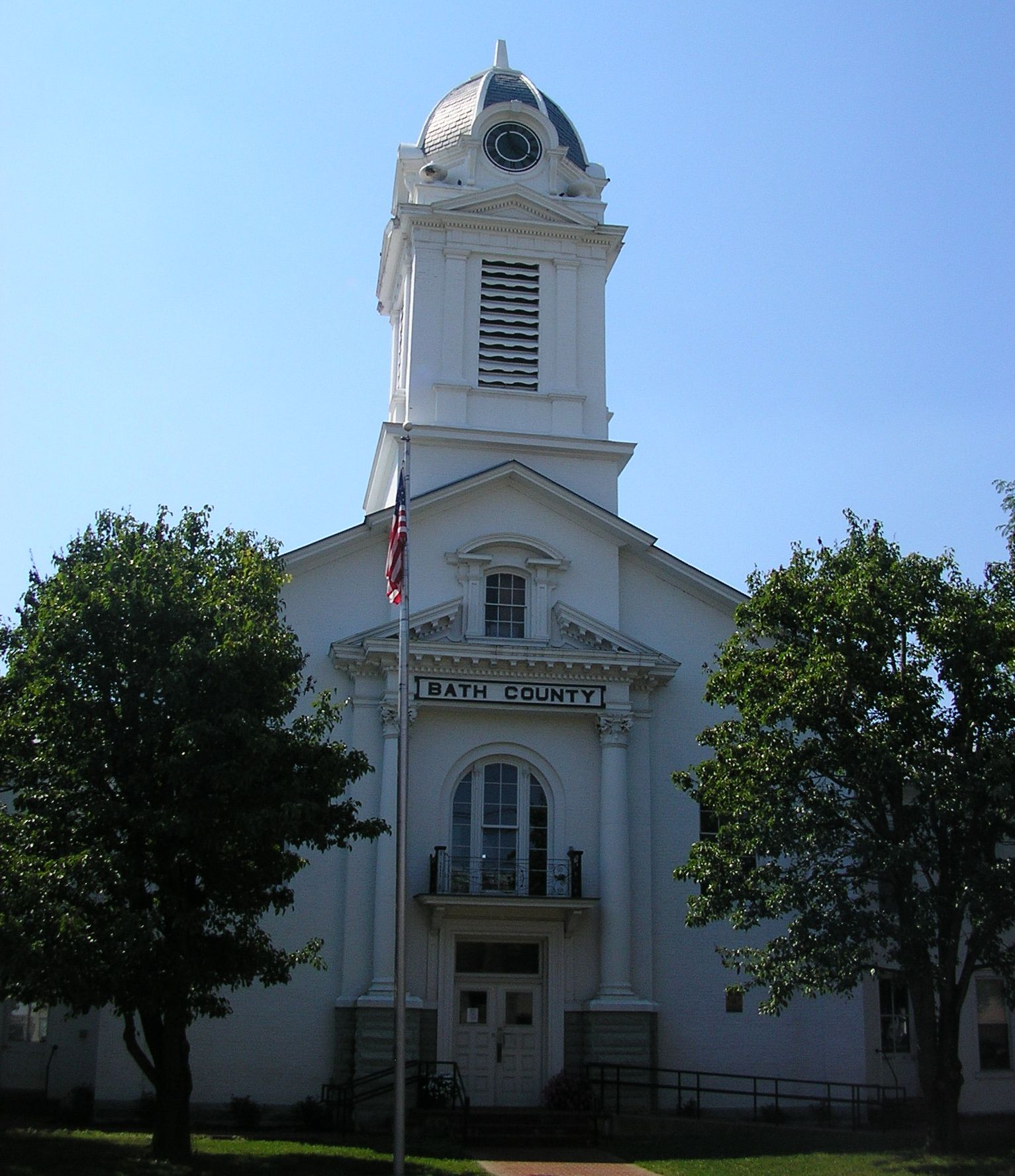
- Bath County Courthouse in Owingsville

- Location within the U.S. state of Kentucky
- Coordinates: 38°08′N 83°44′W
- Country: United States
- State: Kentucky
- Founded: 1811
- Named for: Medicinal springs located within the county
- Seat: Owingsville
- Largest city: Owingsville

Government
  - Judge/Executive: Forrest McKenzie (R)

Area
  - Total: 284 sq mi (740 km^{2})
  - Land: 279 sq mi (720 km^{2})
  - Water: 5.2 sq mi (13 km^{2}) 1.8%

Population (2020)
  - Total: 12,750
  - Estimate (2025): 13,176 ▲
  - Density: 47.2/sq mi (18.2/km^{2})
- Time zone: UTC−5 (Eastern)
  - Summer (DST): UTC−4 (EDT)
- Congressional districts: 5th, 6th
- Website: bathcounty.ky.gov

Bath County is a county located in the U.S. state of Kentucky. As of the 2020 census, the population was 12,750. The county seat is Owingsville. The county was formed in 1811. Bath County is included in the Mount Sterling, KY Micropolitan Statistical Area, which is also included in the Lexington-Fayette–Richmond–Frankfort, KY combined statistical area.

== History ==
Bath County was established in 1811 from land given by Montgomery County, Kentucky. Its name is derived from natural springs said to have medicinal qualities. The courthouse in Owingsville was destroyed by an accidental fire caused by Union troops during the American Civil War in 1864.

It is the site of the Kentucky Meat Shower. From 11 a.m. to 12 p.m., on March 3, 1876, a mysterious substance believed to be meat of some sort fell from the sky.

In 1932, an archaeological field survey observed fourteen archaeological sites in Bath County, including the Ramey Mound near Sharpsburg and multiple ancient burials near the Springfield Presbyterian Church.

== Geography ==
According to the U.S. Census Bureau, the county has a total area of 284 square miles (740 km^{2}), of which 279 square miles (720 km^{2}) is land and 5.2 square miles (13 km^{2}) (1.8%) is water.

=== Adjacent counties ===
- Fleming County (north)
- Rowan County (east)
- Menifee County (southeast)
- Montgomery County (southwest)
- Bourbon County (west)
- Nicholas County (northwest)

=== National protected area ===
- Daniel Boone National Forest (part)

== Demographics ==
Historical population
Census	Pop.	Note	%±
1820	7,961		—
1830	8,799		10.5%
1840	9,763		11.0%
1850	12,115		24.1%
1860	12,113		0.0%
1870	10,145		−16.2%
1880	11,982		18.1%
1890	12,813		6.9%
1900	14,734		15.0%
1910	13,988		−5.1%
1920	11,996		−14.2%
1930	11,075		−7.7%
1940	11,451		3.4%
1950	10,410		−9.1%
1960	9,114		−12.4%
1970	9,235		1.3%
1980	10,025		8.6%
1990	9,692		−3.3%
2000	11,085		14.4%
2010	11,591		4.6%
2020	12,750		10.0%
2025 (est.)	13,176	▲	3.3%
U.S. Decennial Census; 1790–1960 1900–90; 1990–00 2010–20 2025

=== 2020 census ===
As of the 2020 census, the county had a population of 12,750. The median age was 39.9 years. 25.5% of residents were under the age of 18 and 17.5% of residents were 65 years of age or older. For every 100 females there were 98.7 males, and for every 100 females age 18 and over there were 94.4 males age 18 and over.

The racial makeup of the county was 95.6% White, 1.0% Black or African American, 0.0% American Indian and Alaska Native, 0.2% Asian, 0.0% Native Hawaiian and Pacific Islander, 0.5% from some other race, and 2.7% from two or more races. Hispanic or Latino residents of any race comprised 1.4% of the population.

0.0% of residents lived in urban areas, while 100.0% lived in rural areas.

There were 4,878 households in the county, of which 32.7% had children under the age of 18 living with them and 25.7% had a female householder with no spouse or partner present. About 26.8% of all households were made up of individuals and 12.2% had someone living alone who was 65 years of age or older.

There were 5,445 housing units, of which 10.4% were vacant. Among occupied housing units, 72.6% were owner-occupied and 27.4% were renter-occupied. The homeowner vacancy rate was 1.2% and the rental vacancy rate was 6.1%.

=== 2000 census ===
As of the census of 2000, there were 11,085 people, 4,445 households, and 3,195 families residing in the county. The population density was 40 per square mile (15/km^{2}). There were 4,994 housing units at an average density of 18 per square mile (6.9/km^{2}). The racial makeup of the county was 96.87% White, 1.85% Black or African American, 0.21% Native American, 0.02% Asian, 0.40% from other races, and 0.66% from two or more races. 0.80% of the population were Hispanic or Latino of any race.

There were 4,445 households, out of which 32.30% had children under the age of 18 living with them, 57.70% were married couples living together, 10.30% had a female householder with no husband present, and 28.10% were non-families. 25.30% of all households were made up of individuals, and 12.00% had someone living alone who was 65 years of age or older. The average household size was 2.47 and the average family size was 2.93.

In the county, the population was spread out, with 24.20% under the age of 18, 8.60% from 18 to 24, 28.80% from 25 to 44, 23.80% from 45 to 64, and 14.60% who were 65 years of age or older. The median age was 37 years. For every 100 females, there were 97.60 males. For every 100 females age 18 and over, there were 94.80 males.

The median income for a household in the county was $26,018, and the median income for a family was $31,758. Males had a median income of $27,786 versus $20,986 for females. The per capita income for the county was $15,326. About 16.40% of families and 21.90% of the population were below the poverty line, including 29.60% of those under age 18 and 21.20% of those age 65 or over.

== Communities ==
=== Cities ===
- Owingsville (county seat)
- Salt Lick
- Sharpsburg

=== Unincorporated communities ===
- Bald Eagle
- Olympia
- Ore Mines
- Peasticks
- Polksville
- Preston
- Red Bush
- Shrout
- Stepstone
- Upper Prickly Ash

== See also ==
- Dry counties
- National Register of Historic Places listings in Bath County, Kentucky
- Preston, Kentucky
- List of counties in Kentucky

== Politics ==
United States presidential election results for Bath County, Kentucky
Year	Republican		Democratic		Third party(ies)	
Year	No.	%	No.	%	No.	%
1912	1,002	36.34%	1,477	53.57%	278	10.08%
1916	1,360	42.77%	1,796	56.48%	24	0.75%
1920	1,997	44.79%	2,440	54.72%	22	0.49%
1924	1,723	44.90%	2,093	54.55%	21	0.55%
1928	2,223	54.74%	1,830	45.06%	8	0.20%
1932	1,576	34.98%	2,909	64.57%	20	0.44%
1936	1,725	38.08%	2,795	61.70%	10	0.22%
1940	1,636	39.18%	2,528	60.54%	12	0.29%
1944	1,581	41.90%	2,184	57.88%	8	0.21%
1948	1,276	35.26%	2,287	63.19%	56	1.55%
1952	1,737	41.94%	2,400	57.94%	5	0.12%
1956	1,889	45.79%	2,221	53.84%	15	0.36%
1960	1,888	47.75%	2,066	52.25%	0	0.00%
1964	1,009	28.13%	2,571	71.68%	7	0.20%
1968	1,277	38.34%	1,394	41.85%	660	19.81%
1972	1,919	58.47%	1,347	41.04%	16	0.49%
1976	938	30.54%	2,113	68.80%	20	0.65%
1980	1,463	39.56%	2,174	58.79%	61	1.65%
1984	2,020	52.88%	1,781	46.62%	19	0.50%
1988	1,614	43.34%	2,099	56.36%	11	0.30%
1992	1,259	29.95%	2,229	53.02%	716	17.03%
1996	1,229	34.43%	1,886	52.83%	455	12.75%
2000	2,303	51.49%	2,087	46.66%	83	1.86%
2004	2,269	46.13%	2,608	53.02%	42	0.85%
2008	2,234	49.17%	2,210	48.65%	99	2.18%
2012	2,275	55.19%	1,770	42.94%	77	1.87%
2016	3,082	67.19%	1,361	29.67%	144	3.14%
2020	3,986	70.84%	1,573	27.95%	68	1.21%
2024	4,041	74.99%	1,278	23.71%	70	1.30%

Throughout the 20th century, Bath County was overwhelmingly Democratic, only voting the other way in the Republican landslides of 1928, 1972, and 1984. However, in 2000, George W. Bush flipped the county into the Republican column. Bath County was one of the few counties in Kentucky to flip from Bush to Kerry in 2004. Despite Barack Obama's indomitable midwestern strength in 2008, Bath County was one of the small number of counties to flip from Kerry to McCain that year, although Obama lost it very narrowly. In 2016, Donald Trump won over two-thirds of the vote in Bath County.

Despite its Republican devotion in presidential elections, Bath County still retains loyalty to state and local Democrats, as they have not voted for a Republican gubernatorial candidate since 1919.

=== Elected officials ===
Elected officials as of January 3, 2025
U.S. House	Hal Rogers (R)	KY 5
U.S. House	Andy Barr (R)	KY 6
Ky. Senate	Greg Elkins (R)	28
Ky. House	David Hale (R)	74

=== Voter registration ===
Bath County Voter Registration & Party Enrollment as of February 17, 2020
Political Party	Total Voters	Percentage
Democratic	6,940	72.53%
Republican	2,160	22.57%
Others	354	3.70%
Independent	103	1.08%
Libertarian	8	0.08%
Green	1	0.01%
Constitution	1	0.01%
Reform	1	0.01%
Socialist Workers	1	0.01%
Total	9,569	100%

=== Statewide Elections ===
Previous gubernatorial elections results
Year	Republican	Democratic	Third parties
2023	44.19% 1,515	55.81% 1,913	0.00% 0
2019	46.09% 1,672	51.98% 1,886	1.93% 70
2015	46.65% 1,045	49.87% 1,117	3.48% 78
2011	22.61% 417	58.62% 1,081	18.76% 346
2007	33.09% 1,136	66.91% 2,297	0.00% 0
2003	42.56% 1,398	57.44% 1,887	0.00% 0
1999	15.89% 197	55.00% 682	29.11% 202
1995	41.41% 1,309	58.34% 1,844	0.00% 0
