= Owingsville, Kentucky =

- City
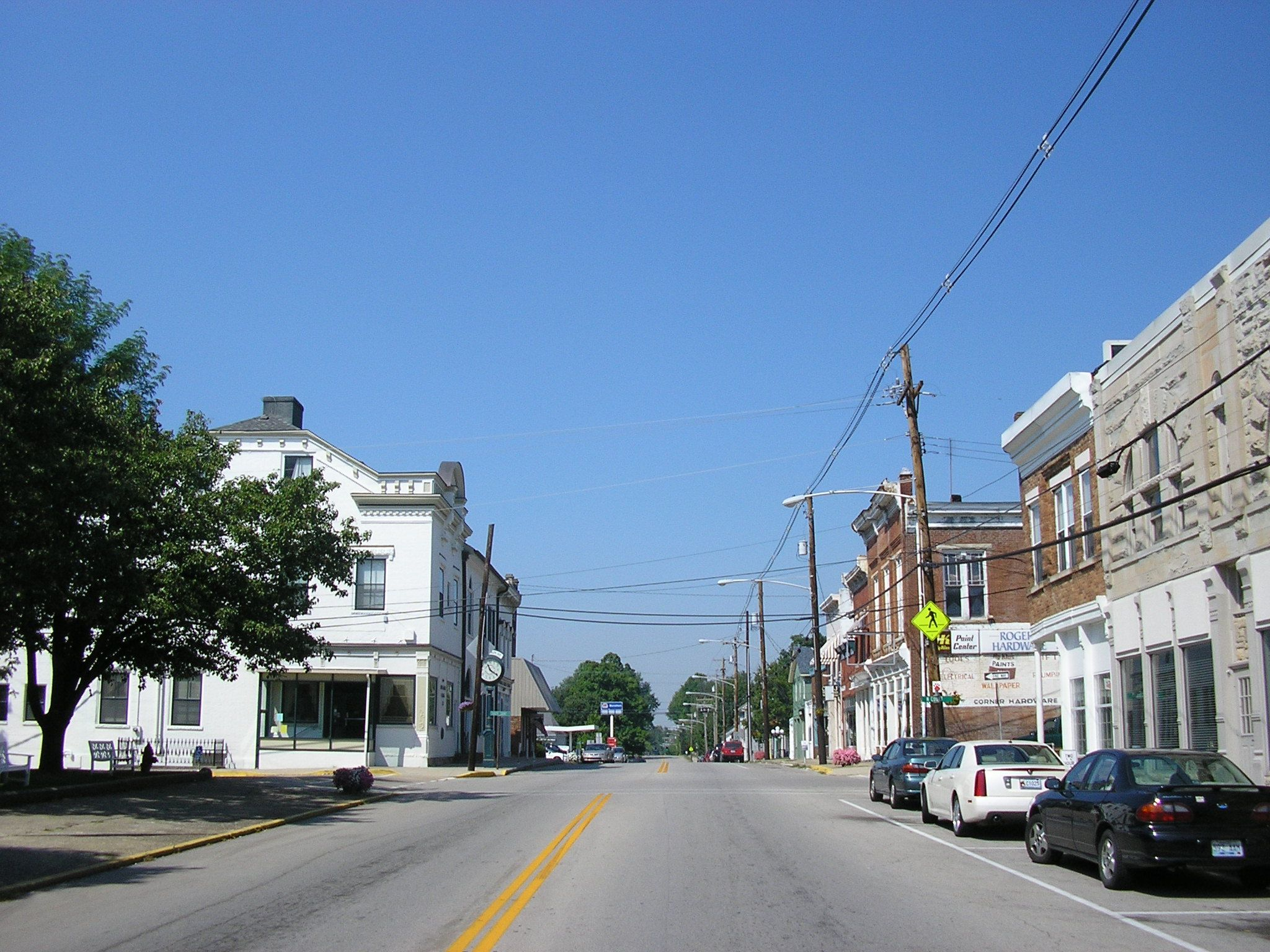
- Downtown Owingsville

- Location of Owingsville in Bath County, Kentucky.

- Location within Kentucky
- Coordinates: 38°08′11″N 83°45′37″W
- Country: United States
- State: Kentucky
- County: Bath
- Established: c. 1811
- Incorporated: 1829
- Named for: Thomas Dye Owings

Government
  - Type: Mayor and City Council
  - Mayor: Gary M. Hunt

Area
  - Total: 2.54 sq mi (6.57 km^{2})
  - Land: 2.51 sq mi (6.51 km^{2})
  - Water: 0.023 sq mi (0.06 km^{2})
- Elevation: 892 ft (272 m)

Population (2020)
  - Total: 1,593
  - Estimate (2022): 1,587
  - Density: 634/sq mi (244.8/km^{2})
- Time zone: UTC-5 (Eastern (EST))
  - Summer (DST): UTC-4 (EDT)
- ZIP code: 40360
- Area code: 606
- FIPS code: 21-58710
- GNIS feature ID: 2404450

Owingsville is a home rule-class city in Bath County, Kentucky, in the United States. As of the 2020 census, Owingsville had a population of 1,593. It is the county seat and is located roughly at the county's center, at the junction of US 60 and Kentucky 36. It is part of the Mount Sterling micropolitan area.

== History ==
In 1795, Colonel Thomas Dye Owings was sent from Maryland to Kentucky by his father to operate some of the first iron furnaces in the region. Within 15 years, Owings had amassed a good deal of wealth and land. Along with Colonel Richard H. Menefee, Owings founded the community that took his name, Owingsville.

Owings and Menefee each owned significant parcels of land in what would become Owingsville. To select whose name the community would take, the two men wagered that the man who built the finer home the quickest would be the namesake of the town. For the sum of $60,000, Owings won the contest. Owingsville was then founded in 1811.

== Geography ==
According to the United States Census Bureau, the city has a total area of 2.4 square miles (6.2 km^{2}), of which 0.023 square miles (0.06 km^{2}), or 0.93%, is water.

== Demographics ==
Historical population
Census	Pop.	Note	%±
1830	241		—
1840	251		4.1%
1860	480		—
1870	550		14.6%
1880	773		40.5%
1890	763		−1.3%
1900	958		25.6%
1910	942		−1.7%
1920	781		−17.1%
1930	933		19.5%
1940	948		1.6%
1950	929		−2.0%
1960	1,040		11.9%
1970	1,381		32.8%
1980	1,419		2.8%
1990	1,491		5.1%
2000	1,488		−0.2%
2010	1,530		2.8%
2020	1,593		4.1%
2022 (est.)	1,587		−0.4%
U.S. Decennial Census

=== 2020 census ===
As of the 2020 census, Owingsville had a population of 1,593. The median age was 40.2 years. 24.9% of residents were under the age of 18 and 19.6% of residents were 65 years of age or older. For every 100 females there were 81.6 males, and for every 100 females age 18 and over there were 75.5 males age 18 and over.

0.0% of residents lived in urban areas, while 100.0% lived in rural areas.

There were 720 households in Owingsville, of which 30.7% had children under the age of 18 living in them. Of all households, 32.4% were married-couple households, 17.8% were households with a male householder and no spouse or partner present, and 41.1% were households with a female householder and no spouse or partner present. About 37.0% of all households were made up of individuals and 19.4% had someone living alone who was 65 years of age or older.

There were 797 housing units, of which 9.7% were vacant. The homeowner vacancy rate was 1.9% and the rental vacancy rate was 5.6%.

Racial composition as of the 2020 census
Race	Number	Percent
White	1,505	94.5%
Black or African American	26	1.6%
American Indian and Alaska Native	0	0.0%
Asian	5	0.3%
Native Hawaiian and Other Pacific Islander	0	0.0%
Some other race	4	0.3%
Two or more races	53	3.3%
Hispanic or Latino (of any race)	38	2.4%

=== 2000 census ===
In the census of 2000, there were 1,488 people, 659 households, and 419 families in the city. The population density was 683.7 inhabitants per square mile (264.0/km^{2}). There were 720 housing units at an average density of 330.8 units per square mile (127.7 units/km^{2}). The racial makeup of the city was 95.23% White, 3.97% African American, 0.13% Native American, and 0.67% from two or more races. 0.67% of the population were Hispanic or Latino of any race.

There were 659 households, out of which 28.5% had children under the age of 18 living with them, 41.7% were married couples living together, 17.9% had a female householder with no husband present, and 36.4% were non-families. 34.4% of all households were made up of individuals, and 22.5% had someone living alone who was 65 years of age or older. The average household size was 2.17 and the average family size was 2.73.

In the city, the population was spread out, with 21.2% under the age of 18, 9.3% from 18 to 24, 22.7% from 25 to 44, 21.0% from 45 to 64, and 25.7% who were 65 years of age or older. The median age was 43 years. For every 100 females, there were 78.6 males. For every 100 females age 18 and over, there were 71.2 males.

The median income for a household in the city was $21,897, and the median income for a family was $34,167. Males had a median income of $30,893 versus $20,208 for females. The per capita income for the city was $18,156. 26.6% of the population and 23.3% of families were below the poverty line. Out of the total population, 41.1% of those under the age of 18 and 18.7% of those 65 and older were living below the poverty line.

== Education ==
Owingsville has a public library, the Bath County Memorial Library.

== Arts and culture ==
Every year since 1954, the county celebrates the May Day Pageant, where high school seniors can compete for the title of "Miss Bath County".

== Notable natives ==
- George Nicholas Bascom, U.S. Army officer whose arrest of Chief Cochise started the Apache Wars
- John Bell Hood, Confederate general
- Andrew Trumbo (1797–1871), United States Representative from Kentucky
