= List of Kentucky railroads =

The following railroads operate in the U.S. state of Kentucky.

== Common freight carriers ==
- BNSF Railway (BNSF)
- Canadian National Railway (CN) through subsidiary Illinois Central Railroad (IC)
- CSX Transportation (CSXT) including subsidiary Carrollton Railroad (CARR)
  - Operates the Glasgow Railway
- Fredonia Valley Railroad (FVRR)
- Kentucky and Tennessee Railway (KT)
- KWT Railway (KWT)
- Louisville and Indiana Railroad (LIRC)
- Louisville Riverport Railroad (LORJ)
- Norfolk Southern Railway (NS) including subsidiary Cincinnati, New Orleans and Texas Pacific Railway (CNTP)
- Paducah and Illinois Railroad (PI)
- Paducah and Louisville Railway (PAL)
- R.J. Corman Railroad/Bardstown Line (RJCR)
- R.J. Corman Railroad/Central Kentucky Lines (RJCC)
- R.J. Corman Railroad/Memphis Line (RJCM)
- Tennken Railroad (TKEN)
- Transkentucky Transportation Railroad (TTIS)
- West Tennessee Railroad (WTNN)

== Private freight carriers ==
- Cando Contracting
- Centrus Energy
- JRL Coal
- Respondek Railroad
- R.J. Corman Railroad Switching

== Passenger carriers ==
- Amtrak (AMTK) - Amtrak has stations at Ashland, South Portsmouth - South Shore, Maysville, and Fulton. There is also an Amtrak bus route connecting Louisville to Indianapolis.

== Defunct railroads ==
| Name | Mark | System (Note: This is one or more of the Class I railroads that the railroad became part of, if any.) | From | To | Successor | Notes |
|---|---|---|---|---|---|---|
| Altamont and Manchester Railroad | | L&N | 1890 | 1898 | Louisville and Nashville Railroad | |
| Artemus–Jellico Railroad | AJR | | 1924 | 1952 | N/A | |
| Ashland Coal and Iron Railway | | C&O | 1880 | 1933 | Chesapeake and Ohio Railway | |
| Baltimore and Ohio Railroad | B&O; BO | B&O | 1905 | 1987 | Chesapeake and Ohio Railway | |
| Bardstown and Louisville Railroad | | L&N | 1854 | 1864 | Louisville and Nashville Railroad | |
| Barren County Railroad | | L&N | 1856 | 1868 | Glasgow Railroad | |
| Beattyville and Cumberland Gap Railroad | | L&N | 1893 | 1900 | Louisville and Atlantic Railroad | |
| Big Sandy Railway | | C&O | 1902 | 1906 | Chesapeake and Ohio Railway of Kentucky | |
| Big Sandy and Cumberland Railroad | BS&C | N&W | 1900 | 1932 | Norfolk and Western Railway | |
| Big Sandy and Kentucky River Railway | BS&K | C&O | 1912 | 1933 | Chesapeake and Ohio Railway | |
| Bowling Green and Tennessee Railroad | | L&N | 1850 | 1852 | Louisville and Nashville Railroad | |
| Bowlinggreen Portage Railway | | L&N | 1836 | 1853 | Louisville and Nashville Railroad | |
| Brooksville Railroad | | | 1895 | 1919 | Brooksville and Ohio River Railroad | |
| Brooksville and Ohio River Railroad | | | 1919 | 1931 | N/A | |
| Buck Creek Railroad | | N&W | 1924? | 1936 | Norfolk and Western Railway | |
| Burlington Northern Inc. | BN | | 1970 | 1981 | Burlington Northern Railroad | |
| Burlington Northern Railroad | BN | | 1981 | 1996 | BNSF Railway | |
| Burnside and Cincinnati Railway | | SOU | 1903 | 1905 | Cincinnati, Burnside and Cumberland River Railway | |
| Burnside and Cumberland River Railway | | SOU | 1890 | 1905 | Burnside and Cincinnati Railway | |
| Cadiz Railroad | CAD | | 1901 | 1988 | N/A | |
| Caney Valley Railway | | | 1910 | 1933? | N/A | |
| Carolina, Clinchfield and Ohio Railway | CC&O, CCO | ACL; L&N | c. 1915 | 1990 | CSX Transportation | |
| Carolina, Cumberland Gap and Chicago Railway | | | 1882 | 1895 | N/A | Sold at foreclosure; no railroad owned in Kentucky |
| Carrollton and Worthville Railroad | | | 1905 | 1929 | Carrollton Railroad | |
| Central City Passenger and Transportation Company | | C&O | 1888 | 1888 | Passenger and Belt Railway | |
| Central Mississippi Railroad | | IC | 1877 | 1878 | Chicago, St. Louis and New Orleans Railroad | |
| Central Transfer Company | | L&N; SOU | 1884 | 1890 | Central Transfer Railway and Storage Company | |
| Central Transfer Railway and Storage Company | | L&N; SOU | 1890 | | | Still exists as a joint subsidiary of CSX Transportation and the Norfolk Southern Railway |
| Charleston, Cincinnati and Chicago Railroad | | C&O | 1887 | 1893 | Ohio River and Charleston Railway of Kentucky | |
| Chattaroi Railway | | C&O | 1873 | 1888 | Ohio and Big Sandy Railroad | |
| Chesapeake and Nashville Railway | | L&N | 1884 | 1892 | Gallatin and Scottsville Railway | |
| Chesapeake and Ohio Railway | C&O; CO | C&O | c. 1880 | 1987 | CSX Transportation | |
| Chesapeake and Ohio Railway of Kentucky | | C&O | 1904 | 1907 | Chesapeake and Ohio Railway | |
| Chesapeake and Ohio Northern Railway | | C&O | 1914 | 1930 | Chesapeake and Ohio Railway | |
| Chesapeake, Ohio and Southwestern Railroad | | IC | 1882 | 1896 | Chicago, St. Louis and New Orleans Railroad | |
| Chicago, Burlington and Quincy Railroad | CB&Q; CBQ | CB&Q | ? | 1970 | Burlington Northern Inc. | |
| Chicago, Indianapolis and Louisville Railway | CI&L; CIL | MON | 1897 | 1956 | Monon Railroad | |
| Chicago, Memphis and Gulf Railroad | | IC | 1910 | 1963 | Illinois Central Railroad | |
| Chicago, Milwaukee, St. Paul and Pacific Railroad | MILW | MILW | 1973 | 1985 | The Milwaukee Road, Inc. | |
| Chicago, St. Louis and New Orleans Railroad | | IC | 1878 | 1951 | Illinois Central Railroad | |
| Cincinnati, Burnside and Cumberland River Railway | | SOU | 1905 | 1970 | Cincinnati, New Orleans and Texas Pacific Railway | |
| Cincinnati, Flemingsburg and Southeastern Railroad | | | 1905 | 1920? | Flemingsburg and Northern Railroad | |
| Cincinnati, Green River and Nashville Railroad | | L&N | 1882 | 1884 | Chesapeake and Nashville Railway | |
| Cincinnati, Lexington and East Tennessee Railroad | | SOU | 1867 | 1873 | Cincinnati Southern Railway | |
| Cincinnati and Southeastern Railway | | | 1880 | 1892? | Covington, Flemingsburg and Ashland Railway | |
| Cincinnati Southern Railway | | SOU | 1869 | | | Still exists as a lessor of Norfolk Southern Railway operating subsidiary Cincinnati, New Orleans and Texas Pacific Railway |
| City Passenger Railway | | C&O | 1886 | 1888 | Central City Passenger and Transportation Company | |
| Clinchfield Railroad | CRR | ACL; L&N | 1924 | 1983 | Seaboard System Railroad | |
| Clinchfield Northern Railway of Kentucky | | ACL; L&N | 1911 | 1940 | Carolina, Clinchfield and Ohio Railway | |
| Consolidated Rail Corporation | CR | | 1976 | 1994 | Louisville and Indiana Railroad | |
| Covington and Cincinnati Elevated Railroad and Transfer and Bridge Company | | C&O | 1886 | 1985 | Chesapeake and Ohio Railway | |
| Covington and Cincinnati Pier Bridge Company | | C&O | 1884 | 1886 | Covington and Cincinnati Elevated Railroad and Transfer and Bridge Company | |
| Covington, Flemingsburg and Ashland Railway | | | 1892 | 1905 | Cincinnati, Flemingsburg and Southeastern Railroad | |
| Covington, Flemingsburg and Pound Gap Railway | | | 1876 | 1879 | Licking Valley Railway | |
| Covington, Flemingsburg and Southeastern Railway | | | 1880 | 1880 | Cincinnati and Southeastern Railway | |
| Covington and Lexington Railroad | | L&N | 1849 | 1859 | Kentucky Central Railroad | |
| Covington Short Route Transfer Railway | | C&O | 1888 | 1904 | Chesapeake and Ohio Railway of Kentucky | |
| Cumberland Railroad | CMB | | 1902 | 1924 | Artemus–Jellico Railroad | |
| Cumberland Railway | | SOU | 1905? | 1944? | Southern Railway | |
| Cumberland Railway | | | 1882 | 1882 | Carolina, Cumberland Gap and Chicago Railway | |
| Cumberland and Manchester Railroad | C&M | L&N | 1915 | 1936 | Louisville and Nashville Railroad | |
| Cumberland and Ohio Railroad | | L&N | 1869 | 1878 | Northern Division of the Cumberland and Ohio Railroad; Southern Division of the Cumberland and Ohio Railroad | |
| Cumberland River and Tennessee Railroad | | L&N | 1893 | 1901 | Louisville and Nashville Railroad | |
| East Kentucky Southern Railway | EKS | | 1928 | 1933 | N/A | |
| East Tennessee, Virginia and Georgia Railway | | SOU | 1890? | 1894 | Southern Railway | |
| Eastern Kentucky Railway | EK | | 1870 | 1929 | East Kentucky Southern Railway | |
| Elizabethtown, Lexington and Big Sandy Railroad | | C&O | 1869 | 1902 | Lexington and Big Sandy Railway | |
| Elizabethtown and Paducah Railroad | | IC | 1867 | 1874 | Louisville, Paducah and Southwestern Railroad | |
| Elkhorn and Beaver Valley Railway | | C&O | 1904 | | Chesapeake and Ohio Railway | |
| Elkhorn Southern Railway | | ACL; L&N | 1906 | 1911 | Clinchfield Northern Railway of Kentucky | |
| Elkton Railroad | | L&N | 1871 | 1884 | Elkton and Guthrie Railroad | |
| Elkton and Guthrie Railroad | | L&N | 1884 | 1957 | N/A | |
| Evansville, Henderson and Nashville Railroad | | L&N | 1867 | 1872 | St. Louis and South Eastern Railway | |
| Evansville, Owensboro and Nashville Railroad | | L&N | 1873 | 1877 | Owensboro and Nashville Railroad | |
| Falls City Belt Line Railway | | PRR | 1902 | 1903 | Pennsylvania Terminal Railway | |
| Flemingsburg and Northern Railroad | | | 1920 | 1955 | N/A | |
| Frankfort and Cincinnati Railroad | FCIN | | 1927 | 1985 | N/A | |
| Frankfort and Cincinnati Railway | | | 1897 | 1927 | Frankfort and Cincinnati Railroad | |
| Frankfort, Paris and Big Sandy Railroad | | | 1871 | 1881 | Paris, Georgetown and Frankfort Railroad | |
| Gallatin and Scottsville Railway | | L&N | 1906 | 1907 | Louisville and Nashville Railroad | |
| Glasgow Railroad | | L&N | 1868 | 1899 | Glasgow Railway | |
| Glasgow Railway | | L&N | 1899 | | | Still exists as a lessor of CSX Transportation |
| Gulf, Mobile and Northern Railroad | GM&N | GM&O | 1926 | 1938 | N/A | |
| Gulf, Mobile and Ohio Railroad | GM&O; GMO | GM&O | 1940 | 1972 | Illinois Central Gulf Railroad | |
| Hardin Southern Railroad | HSRR | | 1993 | 2005 | KWT Railway | |
| Henderson Belt Railroad | | L&N | 1888 | 1957 | Louisville and Nashville Railroad | |
| Henderson Bridge Company | | L&N | 1872 | 1906 | Henderson Bridge and Railroad Company | |
| Henderson Bridge and Railroad Company | | L&N | 1906 | 1906 | Louisville and Nashville Railroad | |
| Henderson and Nashville Railroad | | L&N | 1837 | 1867 | Evansville, Henderson and Nashville Railroad | |
| Hickman and Obion Railroad | | L&N | 1854 | 1855 | Nashville and North Western Railroad | |
| Hodgenville and Elizabethtown Railway | | IC | 1884 | 1902 | Chicago, St. Louis and New Orleans Railroad | |
| Illinois Central Railroad | IC | IC | 1882? | 1972 | Illinois Central Gulf Railroad | |
| Illinois Central Gulf Railroad | ICG | | 1972 | 1988 | Illinois Central Railroad | |
| Indiana, Alabama and Texas Railroad | | L&N | 1885 | 1887 | Louisville and Nashville Railroad | |
| Indiana Hi-Rail Corporation | IHRC | | 1986 | 1996 | CSX Transportation | |
| Jellico, Bird-Eye and Northern Railway | | L&N | 1893 | 1902 | Louisville and Nashville Railroad | |
| J&J Railroad | JJRD | | 1983 | 1993 | Hardin Southern Railroad | |
| Kentucky Central Railroad | | L&N | 1861 | 1887 | Kentucky Central Railway | |
| Kentucky Central Railway | | L&N | 1887 | 1891 | Louisville and Nashville Railroad | |
| Kentucky Highlands Railroad | | L&N | 1907 | 1915 | Louisville and Nashville Railroad | |
| Kentucky and Indiana Bridge Company | | SOU | 1880 | 1900 | Kentucky and Indiana Bridge and Railroad Company | |
| Kentucky and Indiana Bridge and Railroad Company | | SOU | 1900 | 1910 | Kentucky and Indiana Terminal Railroad | |
| Kentucky and Indiana Terminal Railroad | KIT | SOU | 1910 | 1981 | Southern Railway | |
| Kentucky Midland Railroad | | IC | 1904 | 1922 | Chicago, St. Louis and New Orleans Railroad | |
| Kentucky Midland Railway | | | 1888 | 1897 | Frankfort and Cincinnati Railway | |
| Kentucky Northern Railroad | | | 1896 | 1900 | N/A | |
| Kentucky, Rockcastle and Cumberland Railroad | | | 1913 | | N/A | |
| Kentucky and South Atlantic Railroad | | C&O | 1888 | 1902 | Lexington and Big Sandy Railway | |
| Kentucky and South Atlantic Railway | | C&O | 1882 | 1887 | Kentucky and South Atlantic Railroad | |
| Kentucky Southern Railroad | | L&N | 1872 | 1882 | Louisville, St. Louis and Texas Railway | |
| Kentucky and Tennessee Railroad | | GM&O | 1870 | 1872 | Mobile and Ohio Railroad | |
| Kentucky and Tennessee Railroad | | | 1902 | 1904 | Kentucky and Tennessee Railway | |
| Kentucky Union Railway | | L&N | 1854 | 1894 | Lexington and Eastern Railway | |
| Kentucky Valley Railroad | | IC | 1905 | 1913 | Chicago, St. Louis and New Orleans Railroad | |
| Kentucky and Virginia Railroad | | L&N | 1915 | 1915 | Louisville and Nashville Railroad | |
| Kentucky Western Railway | | IC | 1899 | 1902 | Chicago, St. Louis and New Orleans Railroad | |
| Kinniconnick and Freestone Railway | | C&O | 1890 | 1908 | Chesapeake and Ohio Railway of Kentucky | |
| Knox Creek Railway | | N&W | 1912 | 1936 | Norfolk and Western Railway | |
| Knoxville, Cumberland Gap and Louisville Railroad | | L&N | 1888 | 1895 | Knoxville, Cumberland Gap and Louisville Railway | |
| Knoxville, Cumberland Gap and Louisville Railway | | L&N | 1895 | 1896 | Middlesborough Railroad | |
| Lenox Railroad | | | 1918 | 1926? | N/A | |
| Levisa River Railroad | | C&O | 1911 | 1946 | Chesapeake and Ohio Railway | |
| Lexington and Big Sandy Railroad | | C&O | 1852 | 1864 | Lexington and Big Sandy Railroad, Eastern Division; Lexington and Big Sandy Railroad, Western Division | |
| Lexington and Big Sandy Railroad, Eastern Division | | C&O | 1865 | 1880 | Ashland Coal and Iron Railway | |
| Lexington and Big Sandy Railroad, Western Division | | C&O | 1865 | 1871 | Elizabethtown, Lexington and Big Sandy Railroad | |
| Lexington and Big Sandy Railway | | C&O | 1902 | 1904 | Chesapeake and Ohio Railway of Kentucky | |
| Lexington and Danville Railroad | | SOU | 1850 | 1858 | Lexington and Southern Kentucky Railroad | |
| Lexington and Eastern Railway | | L&N | 1894 | 1915 | Louisville and Nashville Railroad | |
| Lexington and Frankfort Railroad | | L&N | 1848 | 1869 | Louisville, Cincinnati and Lexington Railroad | |
| Lexington and Ohio Railroad | LXOH | | 1996 | 2003 | R.J. Corman Railroad/Central Kentucky Lines | |
| Lexington and Ohio Railroad | | L&N | 1830 | 1842 | Lexington and Frankfort Railroad; Louisville and Frankfort Railroad | |
| Lexington and Southern Kentucky Railroad | | SOU | 1860 | 1867 | Cincinnati, Lexington and East Tennessee Railroad | |
| Lexington Union Station Company | | C&O; L&N | 1905 | | | |
| Licking and Lexington Railroad | | L&N | 1847 | 1849 | Covington and Lexington Railroad | |
| Licking River Railroad | | | 1899 | 1913 | N/A | |
| Licking Valley Railway | | | 1896 | 1899 | Licking River Railroad | |
| Licking Valley Railway | | | 1880 | 1880 | Covington, Flemingsburg and Southeastern Railway | |
| Long Fork Railway | | C&O | 1912 | 1933 | Chesapeake and Ohio Railway | |
| Louisville and Atlantic Railroad | | L&N | 1899 | 1909 | Louisville and Nashville Railroad | |
| Louisville Bridge Company | | PRR | 1856 | 1918 | Louisville Bridge and Railroad Company | |
| Louisville Bridge and Railroad Company | | PRR | 1918 | 1918 | Louisville Bridge and Terminal Railway | |
| Louisville Bridge and Terminal Railway | | PRR | 1918 | 1954 | Penndel Company | |
| Louisville, Cincinnati and Lexington Railroad | | L&N | 1869 | 1877 | Louisville, Cincinnati and Lexington Railway | |
| Louisville, Cincinnati and Lexington Railway | | L&N | 1877 | 1881 | Louisville and Nashville Railroad | |
| Louisville, Cloverport and Western Railway | | L&N | 1880 | 1882 | Louisville, St. Louis and Texas Railway | |
| Louisville and Frankfort Railroad | | L&N | 1847 | 1869 | Louisville, Cincinnati and Lexington Railroad | |
| Louisville, Hardinsburg and Western Railway | | L&N | 1888 | 1892 | Louisville, St. Louis and Texas Railway | |
| Louisville, Harrodsburg and Virginia Railroad | | | 1868 | 1884 | Louisville Southern Railroad | Chartered, but never laid track until reorganization |
| Louisville, Harrods Creek and Westport Railroad | | L&N | 1879 | 1904 | Louisville and Nashville Railroad | |
| Louisville, Harrods Creek and Westport Railway | | L&N | 1870 | 1879 | Louisville, Harrods Creek and Westport Railroad | |
| Louisville, Henderson and St. Louis Railway | LH&S; LHS | L&N | 1896 | 1984 | Seaboard System Railroad | |
| Louisville and Jeffersonville Bridge Company | | NYC | 1888 | 1917 | Louisville and Jeffersonville Bridge and Railroad Company | |
| Louisville and Jeffersonville Bridge and Railroad Company | | NYC | 1917 | 1968 | N/A | |
| Louisville and Nashville Railroad | L&N; LN | L&N | 1850 | 1983 | Seaboard System Railroad | |
| Louisville, New Albany and Chicago Railway | | MON | 1882 | 1897 | Chicago, Indianapolis and Louisville Railway | |
| Louisville, Paducah and Southwestern Railroad | | IC | 1874 | 1876 | Paducah and Elizabethtown Railroad | |
| Louisville Railway Transfer Company | | L&N | 1871 | 1893 | Louisville and Nashville Railroad | |
| Louisville, St. Louis and Texas Railway | | L&N | 1882 | 1896 | Louisville, Henderson and St. Louis Railway | |
| Louisville Southern Railroad | LS | SOU | 1884 | 1894 | Southern Railway in Kentucky | |
| Louisville and Southwestern Railway | | SOU | 1882 | 1889 | Louisville Southern Railroad | |
| Madisonville, Hartford and Eastern Railroad | | L&N | 1905 | 1912 | Louisville and Nashville Railroad | |
| Madisonville and Shawneetown Straight Line Railroad | | L&N | 1870 | 1872 | St. Louis and Southeastern Railway | |
| Mammoth Cave Railroad | | | 1874 | 1931 | N/A | |
| Maysville and Big Sandy Railroad | | C&O | 1850 | 1904 | Chesapeake and Ohio Railway of Kentucky | |
| Maysville and Lexington Railroad | | L&N | 1850 | 1856 | Maysville and Lexington Railroad, Northern Division; Maysville and Lexington Railroad, Southern Division | |
| Maysville and Lexington Railroad, North Division | | L&N | 1876 | 1921 | Louisville and Nashville Railroad | |
| Maysville and Lexington Railroad, Northern Division | | L&N | 1868 | 1875 | Maysville and Lexington Railroad, North Division | |
| Maysville and Lexington Railroad, Southern Division | | L&N | 1868 | 1921 | Louisville and Nashville Railroad | |
| Memphis, Clarksville and Louisville Railroad | | L&N | 1852 | 1871 | Louisville and Nashville Railroad | |
| Memphis, Paducah and Northern Railroad | | IC | 1878 | 1881 | Chesapeake, Ohio and Southwestern Railroad | |
| Middle Division of the Cumberland and Ohio Railroad | | L&N | 1880 | 1888 | Louisville and Nashville Railroad | |
| Middlesborough Railroad | | L&N | 1895 | 1896 | Louisville and Nashville Railroad | |
| Middlesborough Belt Railroad | | L&N | 1890 | 1895 | Middlesborough Railroad | |
| Middlesboro Mineral Railway | | SOU | 1900 | 1905 | Cumberland Railway | |
| Millers Creek Railroad | | C&O | 1909 | 1933 | Chesapeake and Ohio Railway | |
| The Milwaukee Road, Inc. | MILW | MILW | 1985 | 1986 | Soo Line Railroad | |
| Mississippi Central Railroad | | IC | 1859 | 1874 | New Orleans, St. Louis and Chicago Railroad | |
| Mississippi River Railway | | IC | 1860 | 1872 | Paducah and Memphis Railroad | |
| Mobile and Ohio Railroad | | GM&O | 1848 | 1940 | Gulf, Mobile and Ohio Railroad | |
| Monon Railroad | MON | MON | 1956 | 1971 | Louisville and Nashville Railroad | |
| Morehead and North Fork Railroad | | | 1905 | 1973? | N/A | |
| Morehead and West Liberty Railroad | | | | 1906 | Morehead and North Fork Railroad | |
| Morganfield and Atlanta Railroad | | L&N | 1905 | 1921 | Louisville and Nashville Railroad | |
| Mount Sterling Coal Road | | C&O | 1874 | 1882 | Kentucky and South Atlantic Railway | |
| Mountain Central Railway | | | 1914 | 1928 | N/A | |
| Nashville and Chattanooga Railroad | | L&N | | 1873 | Nashville, Chattanooga and St. Louis Railway | |
| Nashville and Clarksville Railroad | | IC | 1901 | 1902 | Tennessee Central Railroad | |
| Nashville, Chattanooga and St. Louis Railway | N&C; NC | L&N | 1873 | 1957 | Louisville and Nashville Railroad | |
| Nashville and North Western Railroad | | L&N | 1855 | 1871 | Nashville and Chattanooga Railroad | |
| New Orleans and Ohio Railroad | | IC | 1852 | 1869 | Paducah and Gulf Railroad | |
| New Orleans, St. Louis and Chicago Railroad | | IC | 1874 | 1877 | Central Mississippi Railroad | |
| Newport and Cincinnati Bridge Company | | L&N | 1868 | 1904 | Louisville and Nashville Railroad | |
| Newport News and Mississippi Valley Company | | C&O | | | Chesapeake and Ohio Railway | |
| Norfolk and Western Railway | N&W; NW | N&W | | 1998 | Norfolk Southern Railway | |
| Northern Division of the Cumberland and Ohio Railroad | | L&N | 1878 | 1900 | Shelbyville, Bloomfield and Ohio Railroad | |
| Ohio and Big Sandy Railroad | | C&O | 1889 | 1902 | Lexington and Big Sandy Railway | |
| Ohio and Kentucky Railway | | | 1894 | 1933 | N/A | |
| Ohio and Kentucky Bridge Company | | C&O | 1886 | 1886 | Covington and Cincinnati Elevated Railroad and Transfer and Bridge Company | |
| Ohio, Kentucky and Virginia Railway | | C&O | 1886 | 1887 | Charleston, Cincinnati and Chicago Railroad | |
| Ohio River and Charleston Railway of Kentucky | | C&O | 1894 | 1902 | Lexington and Big Sandy Railway | |
| Ohio Valley Railroad | | IC | 1880 | 1886 | Ohio Valley Railway | |
| Ohio Valley Railway | | IC | 1886 | 1897 | Chicago, St. Louis and New Orleans Railroad | |
| Ohio Valley Coal and Mining Company | | IC | 1886 | 1888 | Ohio Valley Railway | |
| Ohio Valley Railroad and Mining Company | | IC | 1882 | 1886 | Ohio Valley Coal and Mining Company | |
| Olympia and Owingsville Railway | | | 1916 | 1918 | N/A | |
| Owensboro, Falls of Rough and Green River Railroad | | IC | 1882 | 1897 | Chicago, St. Louis and New Orleans Railroad | |
| Owensboro and Nashville Railroad | | L&N | 1877 | 1881 | Owensboro and Nashville Railway | |
| Owensboro and Nashville Railway | | L&N | 1881 | 1921 | Louisville and Nashville Railroad | |
| Owensboro and Russellville Railroad | | L&N | 1867 | 1873 | Evansville, Owensboro and Nashville Railroad | |
| Owingsville and Olympia Railroad | | | 1915? | 1916 | Olympia and Owingsville Railway | |
| Paducah and Elizabethtown Railroad | | IC | 1877 | 1882 | Chesapeake, Ohio and Southwestern Railroad | |
| Paducah and Gulf Railroad | | IC | 1869 | 1872 | Paducah and Memphis Railroad | |
| Paducah and Illinois Railroad | PI | CB&Q; IC; L&N | 1910 | | | Still exists as a joint subsidiary of the BNSF Railway, Canadian National Railway, and CSX Transportation |
| Paducah and Memphis Railroad | | IC | 1872 | 1877 | Memphis, Paducah and Northern Railroad | |
| Paducah, Tennessee and Alabama Railroad | | L&N | 1892 | 1895 | Louisville and Nashville Railroad | |
| Paducah Union Depot Company | | IC | 1888 | 1913 | Chicago, St. Louis and New Orleans Railroad | |
| Paris, Georgetown and Frankfort Railroad | | | 1871 | 1888 | Kentucky Midland Railway | |
| Passenger and Belt Railway | | C&O | 1888 | 1895 | Chesapeake and Ohio Railway | |
| Penn Central Transportation Company | PC | | 1968 | 1976 | Consolidated Rail Corporation | |
| Penndel Company | | PRR | 1954 | 1976 | Consolidated Rail Corporation | |
| Pennsylvania Railroad | PRR | PRR | 1921? | 1968 | Penn Central Transportation Company | |
| Pennsylvania Terminal Railway | | PRR | 1903 | 1918 | Louisville Bridge and Terminal Railway | |
| Pine Mountain Railroad | | L&N | 1905 | 1913 | Louisville and Nashville Railroad | |
| Portsmouth and Tygart Valley Railroad | | | 1892? | ≤1911 | N/A | |
| Princeton and Ohio River Railroad | | L&N | 1882 | 1885 | Indiana, Alabama and Texas Railroad | |
| Red River Valley Railroad | | | | 1914? | N/A | |
| Richmond, Nicholasville, Irvine and Beattyville Railroad | | L&N | 1888 | 1899 | Louisville and Atlantic Railroad | |
| Rockcastle Railroad | | | 1913 | 1913 | Rockcastle River Railway | |
| Rockcastle River Railway | | | 1913 | 1932 | N/A | |
| St. Louis and South Eastern Railway | | L&N | 1872 | 1879 | Louisville and Nashville Railroad | |
| St. Louis and Southeastern Railway | | L&N | 1872 | 1872 | St. Louis and South Eastern Railway | |
| Sandy Valley and Elkhorn Railway | | C&O | 1902 | 1933 | Chesapeake and Ohio Railway | |
| Seaboard System Railroad | SBD | | 1983 | 1986 | CSX Transportation | |
| Shelby Railroad | | L&N | 1851 | 1902 | Louisville and Nashville Railroad | |
| Shelbyville, Bloomfield and Ohio Railroad | | L&N | 1900 | 1901 | Louisville and Nashville Railroad | |
| Short Route Railway Transfer Company | | IC | 1873 | 1897 | Chicago, St. Louis and New Orleans Railroad | |
| Soo Line Railroad | SOO | | 1986 | 2006 | Indiana Rail Road | |
| South Kentucky Railroad | | IC | 1871 | 1880 | Ohio Valley Railroad | |
| South and Western Railroad | | ACL; L&N | 1905 | 1908 | Carolina, Clinchfield and Ohio Railway | |
| South and Western Railway | | ACL; L&N | 1902 | 1906 | South and Western Railroad | |
| Southern Railway | SOU | SOU | 1894 | 1990 | Norfolk Southern Railway | |
| Southern Railway in Kentucky | | SOU | 1894 | 1944? | Southern Railway | |
| Southern Division of the Cumberland and Ohio Railroad | | L&N | 1878 | 1903 | Louisville and Nashville Railroad | |
| Southwestern Railroad | | SOU | 1876 | 1889 | Louisville Southern Railroad | |
| Tennessee Central Railroad | | IC | 1902 | 1922 | Tennessee Central Railway | |
| Tennessee Central Railway | TC | IC | 1922 | 1968 | Illinois Central Railroad | |
| Tennessee and Kentucky Railroad | | L&N | 1881 | 1881 | Owensboro and Nashville Railway | |
| Tradewater Railway | TRWY | | 1982 | 1995 | Western Kentucky Railway | |
| Tug River and Kentucky Railroad | | N&W | 1913 | 1936 | Norfolk and Western Railway | |
| Versailles and Midway Railway | | SOU | 1884 | 1889 | Louisville Southern Railroad | |
| Wasioto and Black Mountain Railroad | | L&N | 1908 | 1915 | Kentucky and Virginia Railroad | |
| Williamson and Pond Creek Railroad | | N&W | 1912 | 1936 | Norfolk and Western Railway | |
| Winchester and Beattyville Railroad | | L&N | 1878 | 1893 | Beattyville and Cumberland Gap Railroad | |
| Woodford Railroad | | SOU | 1871 | 1889 | Louisville Southern Railroad | |

=== Electric ===
- Blue Grass Traction Company
- Camden Interstate Railway
- Central Kentucky Traction Company
- Georgetown and Lexington Traction Company
- Louisville Railway
- Louisville, Anchorage and Pewee Valley Electric Railway
- Louisville and Eastern Railroad
- Louisville and Interurban Railroad
- Louisville and Northern Railway and Lighting Company
- Ohio Valley Electric Railway

== See also ==
- List of United States railroads
