= Louisville, Paducah and Southwestern Railroad =

Historic railway company in Kentucky, United States

The Louisville, Paducah and Southwestern Railroad was a 19th-century railway company in western Kentucky in the United States. It operated a passenger service from 1874 (151 years ago), until 1876 (149 years ago), when it was sold for $700,000.

The company was formed when it purchased the Elizabethtown and Paducah Railroad. The railroad was sold on two years later to the Paducah and Elizabethtown. It later made up part of the Illinois Central network and its former rights-of-way currently form parts of the class-II Paducah and Louisville Railway.

It connected with the Owensboro and Russellville Railroad and the later Evansville, Owensboro and Nashville Railroad (both subsequently part of the L&N network) at Central City in Muhlenberg County.

== See also ==
- List of Kentucky railroads
