= Owensboro (disambiguation) =

Owensboro is a city in the U.S. state of Kentucky. "Owensboro" may also refer to:

- Owensboro Bridge
- Owensboro Catholic High School
- Owensboro Community and Technical College
- Owensboro–Daviess County Regional Airport
- Owensboro High School
- Owensboro Medical Health System Hospital
- Owensboro metropolitan area
- Owensboro and Nashville Railroad
- Owensboro and Nashville Railway
- Owensboro Oilers
- Owensboro Public Schools
- Owensboro Rage
- Owensboro and Russellville Railroad
- Owensboro Sportscenter
- Central City, Kentucky, formerly "Owensboro Junction."
- Evansville IceMen, once "Owensboro IceMen."
- Evansville, Owensboro and Nashville Railroad
