= Paducah and Elizabethtown Railroad =

Historical US rail company

The Paducah and Elizabethtown Railroad was a 19th-century railway company in western Kentucky in the United States. It operated from 1877, when it purchased the Louisville, Paducah and Southwestern Railroad, until 1882, when it was purchased by the Chesapeake, Ohio and Southwestern Railroad. It later made up part of the Illinois Central network and its former rights-of-way currently form parts of the class-II Paducah and Louisville Railway.

It connected with the Evansville, Owensboro and Nashville Railroad (the later Owensboro and Nashville Railroad and Railway) at Central City in Muhlenberg County.

== See also ==
- List of Kentucky railroads
