= Chicago, St. Louis and New Orleans Railroad =

19th to early-20th-century railway company in Kentucky

The Chicago, St. Louis and New Orleans Railroad was a 19th- and early-20th-century railway company in Kentucky in the United States. It operated from 1877 and was created from the merger of the Mississippi Central Railroad and the New Orleans, Jackson & Great Northern Railroad until 1882, when control was obtained by the Illinois Central.

In 1896, it purchased the Chesapeake, Ohio and Southwestern Railroad and those former rights-of-way currently form parts of the class-II Paducah and Louisville. In 1897, it purchased the Short Route Railway Transfer Company; the Ohio Valley Railway; and the Owensboro, Falls of Rough and Green River Railroad. In 1902, it purchased the Kentucky Western and the Hodgenville and Elizabethtown Railways. In 1913, it purchased the Paducah Union Depot Company and the Kentucky Valley Railroad. In 1922, it purchased the Kentucky Midland.

The Chicago, St. Louis & New Orleans connected with the Owensboro and Nashville Railway (and later the L&N) at Central City in Muhlenberg County.

== Management ==
In 1877, Stuyvesant Fish was elected secretary of the Chicago, St. Louis and New Orleans Railroad company. In 1882, he became its vice president.

== See also ==
- List of Kentucky railroads
