= Chesapeake, Ohio and Southwestern Railroad =

19th-century US railway company

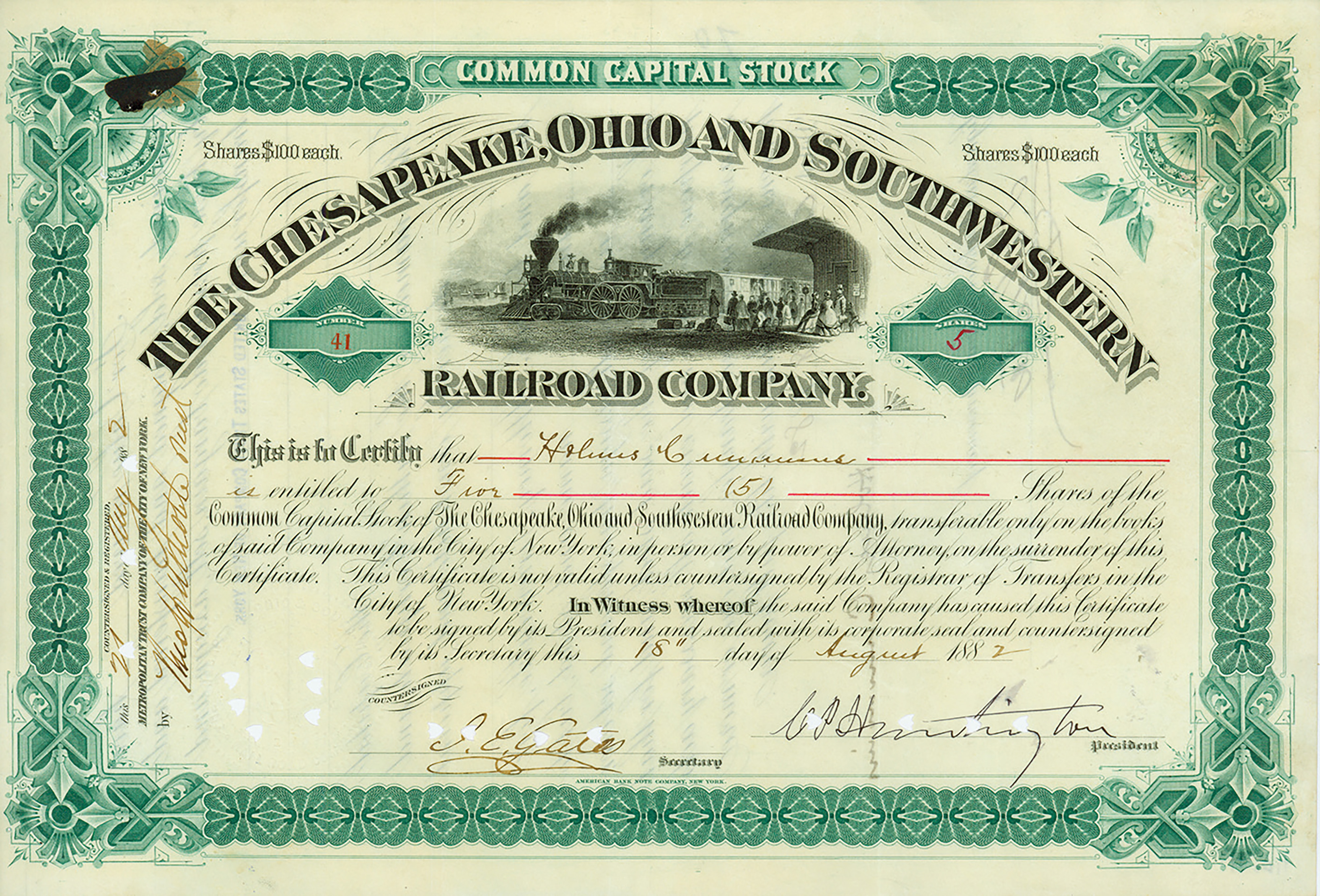
Share of the Chesapeake, Ohio and Southwestern Railroad Company, issued 18 August 1882, signed by Collis P. Huntington

The Chesapeake, Ohio and Southwestern Railroad was a 19th-century railway company in Kentucky in the United States. It operated from 1882, when it purchased the Paducah and Elizabethtown Railroad and the Memphis, Paducah and Northern Railroad, until 1896, when it was purchased by the Chicago, St. Louis and New Orleans Railroad. It later made up part of the Illinois Central network and its former rights-of-way currently form parts of the class-II Paducah and Louisville Railway.

It connected with the Owensboro and Nashville Railway (subsequently part of the L&N network) at Central City in Muhlenberg County.

== Lawsuit ==
In 1884, public school teacher Ida B. Wells sued the Chesapeake, Ohio and Southwestern Railroad company for refusing to allow her to sit in first class, despite her having purchased a first-class ticket. She complained that the front passenger car which the conductor had forcibly moved her to, was unsuitable due to the boisterous behavior of its passengers, who were smoking and drinking. The railroad lost the lawsuit and was ordered by pay the $300 maximum fine, plus $500 in damages. The railroad appealed, and in 1887, the Tennessee Supreme Court reversed the decision, ruling that the smoking car she had been given was equivalent to first class.

== See also ==
- List of Kentucky railroads
