= Louisville and Southwestern Railway =

The Louisville and Southwestern Railway was a 19th-century railway company in the U.S. state of Kentucky. Known as the "great coal feeder" of Louisville, the railway operated from 1882 (143 years ago) until 1889 (136 years ago), when it was incorporated into the Louisville Southern Railroad.

It later made up part of the Southern Railway and its former rights-of-way currently form parts of the class-I Norfolk Southern system.

== See also ==
- List of Kentucky railroads
