= Shelby Railroad =

American railway company

The Shelby Railroad was a 19th-century railway company in the U.S. state of Kentucky. It operated from 1851, when it was created in Shelby County, until 1902, when it was purchased by the Louisville and Nashville Railroad network. Its former rights-of-way currently form parts of the class-I CSX Transportation system. As of 1 October, 2003, the Shelby, aka, the Old Road, has been leased and operated by R J Corman.

The railroad made up a significant part of the economic success of Shelbyville, Kentucky, after the Civil War, particularly after its 1870 connection to the Louisville, Cincinnati and Lexington Railroad mainline at Anchorage.

== See also ==
- List of Kentucky railroads
- The Shelby Iron Company Railroad in Alabama
- The Calera and Shelby Railroad in Alabama
- The Columbus and Shelby Railroad in Indiana
- The Shelby and Rush Railroad in Indiana
- The Norwalk and Shelby Railroad in Ohio
- The Shelby and Detroit Railroad in Michigan.
