= Maysville and Lexington Railroad, North Division =

Defunct railroad company operated 1876-1921

The Maysville and Lexington Railroad, North Division, was a 19th- and early 20th-century railway company in north-central Kentucky in the United States. It operated from 1876, when it reëstablished service on the routes of its failed predecessor, the Northern Division, until 1921, when it was purchased along with the Southern Division by the L&N.

Its routes and rights-of-way are today owned by CSX Transportation.

== See also ==
- Maysville and Lexington Railroad
- List of Kentucky railroads
