= Union Station (Owensboro, Kentucky) =

- U.S. National Register of Historic Places
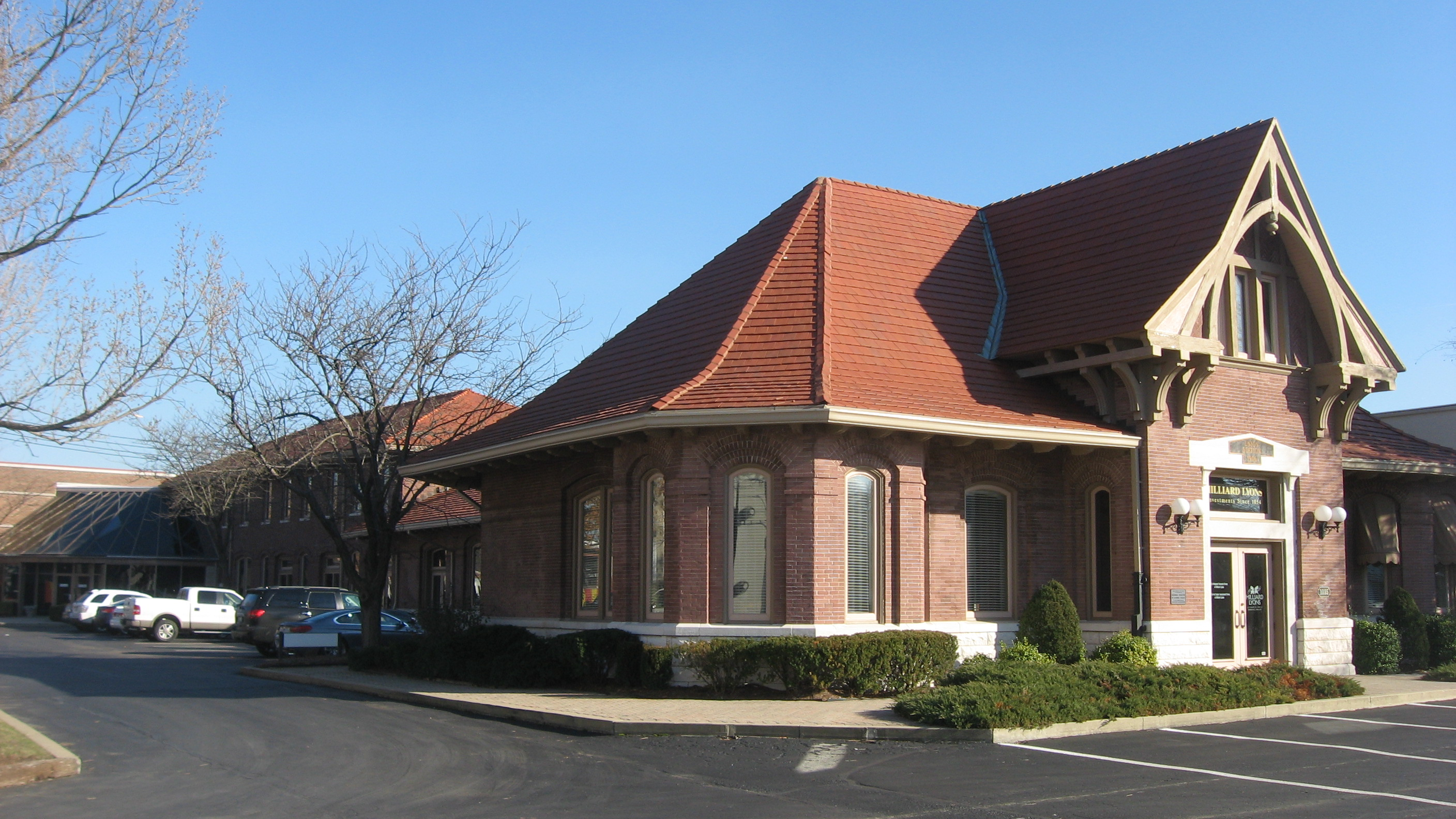
- Front and northern side

- Location within Kentucky Location within the United States
- Location: 1039 Frederica St., Owensboro, Kentucky
- Coordinates: 37°45′56″N 87°6′45″W
- Built: 1905
- Architect: John Bacon Hutchings, Henry Franklin Hawes
- Architectural style: Victorian
- NRHP reference No.: 79000969
- Added to NRHP: August 01, 1979

The Union Station in Owensboro, Kentucky, is a historic railroad station, built in 1905. Built mostly for the Louisville and Nashville Railroad, the station is made of limestone and slate, and currently is home to several businesses.

== Description ==
The Union Station, unlike most urban railroad stations, was situated in a "more spacious area". In the west end was a waiting area, and the east end featured a two-story freight section. The station gains a Gothic look with wooden barge boarding and brackets on its gabled entrance.

The L&N used the second floor of the building for support services and administration.

== History ==
The first railroad company in Owensboro was the Owensboro and Russellville Railroad, in operation from 1867 to 1876. After the O&R went bankrupt, the Owensboro and Nashville Railroad took over the assets, and were in control until purchased by the L&N in 1879.

The station was a joint effort between the L&N, the Louisville, Henderson and St. Louis Railroad, and the Illinois Central Railroad, building over an older depot of the Louisville, Henderson and St. Louis. The plans were designed by Henry F. Hawes and John B. Hutchings and constructed by Walter Brashear. The initial work was completed in 1906.

At its height in the 1920s, the station daily served eighteen passenger trains. In 1946, early in the postwar years, two unnamed L&N trains on St. Louis – Evansville – Owensboro – Louisville itineraries made stops at Owensboro. The trains bypassed the south Kentucky rail hub of Bowling Green.

In 1958, the station stopped being used for passenger traffic, as the L&N claimed annual losses of $130,000 for continuing the passenger service. Since then it has seen several different uses. In the 1970s it was used as a discothèque and then a pizza parlor, but both were unsuccessful, leaving the station empty for a time. Major overhauls of the station occurred in 1982 and 1988, with the latter seeing a two-story atrium and office added to its eastern side. Current tenants include a preschool, an architectural design group, an adult day care, and a Hilliard Lyons office.

== Notes ==
Preceding station	Illinois Central Railroad	Following station
Terminus	Owensboro Division	Oak Ridge toward Horse Branch
Preceding station	Louisville and Nashville Railroad	Following station
Mattingly toward St. Louis	St. Louis – Louisville	Doyle toward Louisville
