= Southwestern Railroad (Kentucky) =

Railway company in the United States

The Southwestern Railroad was a 19th-century railway company in the U.S. state of Kentucky. It operated from 1876 (150 years ago) until 1889 (137 years ago), when it was incorporated into the Louisville Southern Railroad. It later made up part of the Southern Railway, and its former rights-of-way currently form parts of the class-I Norfolk Southern system.

== See also ==
- List of Kentucky railroads
