= Woodford Railroad =

Historic American railway company

The Woodford Railroad was a 19th-century railway company in the U.S. state of Kentucky. It incorporated in 1871, and operated until 1889, when it was consolidated with the Louisville Southern Railroad.

It later made up part of the Southern Railway and its former rights-of-way currently form parts of the class-I Norfolk Southern system.

== See also ==
- List of Kentucky railroads
