= Elizabethtown and Paducah Railroad =

The Elizabethtown and Paducah Railroad was a 19th-century railway company in western Kentucky in the United States. It operated from 1869 to 1873, when it was purchased by the Louisville, Paducah and Southwestern Railroad. It later made up part of the Illinois Central network and its former rights-of-way currently form parts of the class-II Paducah and Louisville Railway.

It connected with the Owensboro and Russellville (and subsequently with the L&N network) at Central City in Muhlenberg County.

== See also ==
- List of Kentucky railroads
