= Louisville and Frankfort Railroad =

The Louisville and Frankfort Railroad (L&F) was a 19th-century railroad in the U.S. state of Kentucky.

Following the 1840 failure of the Lexington and Ohio Railroad, which had only ever managed to connect Louisville with nearby Portland, area businessmen met for years before organizing a new railroad in March 1847. The Louisville and Frankfort was chartered to connect the Ohio port to the state capital, as well as Lexington with any points east. The stretch between the capital and Lexington itself was left for the Lexington and Frankfort, chartered the next year.

After purchasing the L&O's rights-of-way west from Frankfort from the Commonwealth, the Louisville and Frankfort issued stock and raised $800,000 from the City of Louisville. Surveys directed by Col. Stephen H. Long of the U.S. Topographical Engineers selected a new route, employing some but not all of the stretches previously graded by the Lexington and Ohio. The rails for the road were purchased in London, England, and shipped upriver from New Orleans. Construction began in March 1849, heading east from Louisville. The one-story brick passenger station, train shed, freight shed, and roundhouse were all located at Brook and Jefferson Streets. Near Cherokee Gardens in Louisville, the line ran adjacent to present-day Frankfort Avenue. On February 6, 1850, the company held a special round trip to LaGrange for the board of directors and their guests. All the initial track was laid by the spring of 1851 and the completion of a bridge over the Kentucky River near Frankfort permitted the first service along the entire mainline in August.

In 1852, the L&F was connected to the completed Lexington and Frankfort mainline and initiated twice-daily service to Lexington. Connection there to the Covington and Lexington Railroad then permitted travel to Cincinnati's Kentucky suburbs. The L&F and Lexington and Frankfort merged their management and operations on January 1, 1857, and then fully merged as the Louisville, Cincinnati and Lexington Railroad in 1867.

The LC&L later made up part of the L&N. Its rights of way now make up part of the CSX Transportation network.

== Directors ==
The L&F's first president was Thomas Smith of New Castle (d. 1850). He was succeeded by James Guthrie of Louisville.

The L&F's first board of directors included Smith, John J. Jacob, William F. Field, John Hulme, Virgil McKnight, and Jacob Swigert.
