= Maysville and Lexington Railroad, Northern Division =

Defunct railroad company operated 1868-1875

The Maysville and Lexington Railroad, Northern Division, was a 19th-century railway company in north-central Kentucky in the United States. In 1868, along with the Southern Division, it restored the service of the earlier Maysville & Lexington line, which had failed in 1856. The Northern Division was not as successful as the Southern and failed in 1875, after which it was reörganized as the "North Division".

== See also ==
- List of Kentucky railroads
