= WKRL =

WKRL may refer to:

- WKRL-FM, a radio station in Syracuse, New York
- Western Kentucky Railway
