= Owensboro and Nashville Railroad =

The Owensboro and Nashville Railroad was a 19th-century railway company in western Kentucky in the United States. It operated daily trains from its terminus in Owensboro to Louisville, Kentucky, and to points east and west.

It operated from 1877, when it purchased the defunct Evansville, Owensboro and Nashville Railroad, until 1881, when it was purchased by the Owensboro and Nashville Railway. Its former rights-of-way currently form parts of the class-I CSX Transportation railway. It was later absorbed by the Louisville and Nashville Railroad.

It connected with the Paducah and Elizabethtown (subsequently part of the Illinois Central and now the Paducah and Louisville Railway) at Central City in Muhlenberg County.

== See also ==
- List of Kentucky railroads
