= Louisville, Cincinnati and Lexington Railway =

Overview
- Reporting mark: LCL
- Locale: Kentucky
- Dates of operation: January 27, 1830 (as Lexington and Ohio Railroad)–July 1, 1881
- Successors: Louisville and Nashville Railroad; CSX Transportation; R.J. Corman Railroad Group

The Louisville, Cincinnati and Lexington Railway was a 19th-century railway company in the U.S. state of Kentucky. It operated from 1877, when it absorbed the failed Louisville, Cincinnati and Lexington Railroad, which had begun operating in September 1869, until 1881, when it was purchased by the Louisville and Nashville network. Its former rights-of-way currently form parts of the class-I CSX Transportation system.

== History ==
=== 1830–1848: Lexington & Ohio ===
The story of the LCL began with the Lexington and Ohio Railroad, the first railroad in the U.S. Commonwealth of Kentucky. It was the second oldest railroad line west of the Allegheny Mountains.

The Lexington and Ohio was formally chartered by the Kentucky General Assembly on January 27, 1830. The newly formed railroad was tasked with building a line westward from Lexington, Kentucky to the Ohio River. Plans were developed to run the line along the watershed of Elkhorn Creek towards Frankfort, Kentucky. The first section of rail was laid on October 22, 1831, with a ceremony. By August 1 of the following year, the Lexington and Ohio had laid 1.5 miles (2.4 km) of track, stretching to 2 miles (3.2 km) by October 1832.

Efforts to extend the line ramped up the following year. Lexington and Ohio trackage made it to the midway point between Lexington and Frankfort in June 1833, later spawning the present day town of Midway, Kentucky. The railroad was extended further to a point named Duckers Station, bringing the railroad just 6 miles (9.7 km) from Frankfort proper. On January 30, 1834, the railroad finally arrived at Frankfort. However, the railroad did not enter the city proper, but stopped short of it on a bluff overlooking the city to the northeast. In order to access the valley, the L&O utilized a 2,200 feet (670 m) incline.

While the L&O had accomplished half of its goal, expenditures had handicapped the railroad. By 1837, the Lexington and Ohio had no cash on hand. On January 18, 1838, the railroad's leadership agreed to lease out the line to Phillip Swigert & Company, a major stagecoach operator. However, this plan did not save the railroad, and the parent L&O company became completely insolvent by 1840. On January 12, 1842, the assets of the railroad were sold at public auction in Frankfort. The winning bid came from the state itself of over $178,000. The state operated the railroad for only three years, before leasing it out to the new group of McKee & Swigert in 1845. A major accomplishment of the state and McKee & Swigert's stewardship of the line was completion of a 500-foot (150 m) tunnel into downtown Frankfort, enabling the railroad to access the city proper.

=== 1848–1869: Lexington & Frankfort ===
In February 1848, a new company was set up to acquire ownership of the Lexington and Ohio line. Organized as the Lexington and Frankfort Railroad, with ownership stakes by both the state and the city of Lexington. The group would formally acquire ownership of the Lexington and Ohio that fall. One of the first goals for the new railroad was to build a more adequate route into the Kentucky River valley to reach downtown Frankfort. On February 23, 1850, the railroad brought its first passenger train into the city via the new line.

=== 1869–1881: The LCL and L&N purchase ===
In September 1869, the Lexington & Frankfort agreed to merge with the Louisville and Frankfort Railroad to create the Louisville, Cincinnati and Lexington Railroad. Despite the merger, outstanding bonds relating to the construction of the Louisville to Cincinnati "Short Line" put the company in financial straights. The railroad was sent into receivership on September 21, 1874. The railroad's new leadership successfully turned the company around financially, allowing it to exit receivership and reorganize as the Louisville, Cincinnati and Lexington Railway on February 1, 1877.

On July 1, 1881, the Louisville & Nashville Railroad purchased the entirety of the railroad. Three months later on November 1, the L&N would formally absorb the railroad into its operations. Today, former rights-of-way of the railroad form parts of the class-I CSX Transportation system.

== See also ==
- List of Kentucky railroads
