= Fredonia Valley Railroad =

Overview
- Parent company: Respondek Railroad Corporation
- Headquarters: Fredonia, Kentucky
- Reporting mark: FVRR
- Locale: Caldwell County, Kentucky
- Dates of operation: 1998–present
- Predecessor: Western Kentucky Railway

Technical
- Track gauge: 1,435 mm (4 ft 8 1/2 in)

The Fredonia Valley Railroad (reporting mark FVRR) is a Class III railroad subsidiary of Respondek Railroad Corporation.

The line primarily handles aggregate transport from local quarries to an interchange with the Paducah & Louisville Railway. at Princeton, Kentucky.

== History ==
=== Predecessor lineage ===
The trackage configuration of the modern Fredonia Valley Railroad originates from a historical north–south corridor established in the late 19th century by the Ohio Valley Railway, an early corporate predecessor to the Illinois Central Railroad (IC). Under the Illinois Central, the tracks functioned as part of a continuous branch line running between Princeton, Kentucky and Henderson, Kentucky, handling regional agricultural goods, equipment, and bituminous coal traffic.

By the late 20th century, the Illinois Central aggressively divested its underutilized secondary lines in the western Kentucky coal region. In 1995, the assets of the branch were transferred to the Western Kentucky Railway (reporting mark TWRY). Due to sharp declines in traffic, the Western Kentucky Railway systematically filed for abandonment exemptions over major portions of the corridor between 1995 and 1996, effectively leaving the trackage segment between Fredonia and Princeton dormant and physically isolating the active limestone quarry located at Fredonia.

=== Respondek acquisition and reactivation ===
To prevent total abandonment and preserve the rail outlet for the local aggregate mining industry, the Respondek Railroad Corporation intervened in late 1998. Respondek formally leased the remaining 10.5-mile track asset from the Fredonia Valley Clay Company and executed structural repairs to restore safe physical interchanges. The Surface Transportation Board (STB) officially approved the operational transaction in January 1999 under Finance Docket No. 33695, legally chartering the subsidiary as the Fredonia Valley Railroad, Inc. (reporting mark FVRR).

=== Modern status and transition ===
The core commercial mission of the line transitioned strictly into an industrial pipeline dedicated to hauling high-calcium crushed stone and aggregate products out of the Fredonia Quarry (subsequently owned and operated by Martin Marietta and Holcim US).

To streamline logistics, the railroad petitioned the STB under Docket No. AB-592 to modify its legal operating classification from a common-carrier shortline to a proprietary private industrial spur. This reclassification allowed the railroad to function efficiently as an off-grid extension of the quarry's load-out operations while successfully maintaining its continuous physical connection to the national rail grid via its Class I interchange point with the Paducah & Louisville Railway in Princeton.
