= Gravel Switch, Livingston County, Kentucky =

Gravel Switch, Kentucky
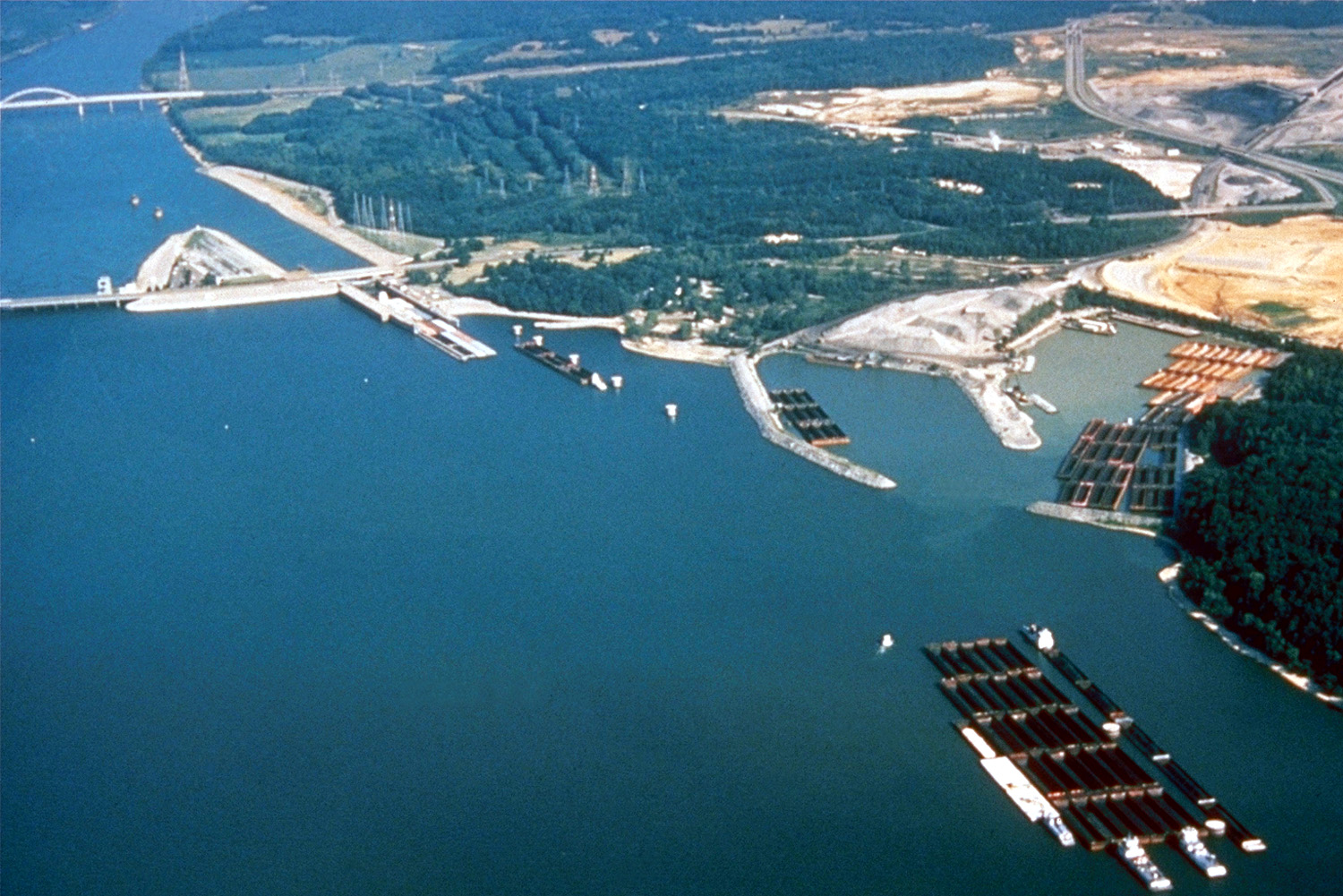
- Dam, quarries, and port in area

- Location in Kentucky Location in the United States
- Coordinates: 37°00′51″N 88°14′56″W
- Country: United States
- State: Kentucky
- County: Livingston
- Elevation: 387 ft (118 m)
- Time zone: UTC-6 (Central (CST))
  - Summer (DST): UTC-5 (CST)
- GNIS feature ID: 493181

Gravel Switch is an area along the Paducah & Louisville Railway (PAL) between the Kentucky Dam on the Tennessee River and Grand Rivers in Livingston County, Kentucky, United States near the interchange of U.S. Route 62 and Kentucky Route 453. The gravel of the area was prized as one of the best cementing gravels for the construction of railroad track ballast. It remains a rail, barge, and transloading terminal for aggregates for Vulcan Materials Company's Grand Rivers Quarry.

== History ==
In the early 1900s PAL's predecessor, the Illinois Central Railroad, had a spur line (its Kentucky Division) to this locale where rock was harvested for use as track ballast for the laying of track. Older maps (1936) show the spurs and surroundings.

After the Kentucky Dam was built and the Tennessee River basin filled (1955 maps), half of the Gravel Switch area and part of the rail line was submerged. The rail line was re-routed over the dam and through the Gravel Switch spur area, which was left above water level, the elevation difference about 36 feet (11 m). (Note: As recorded in 1906 the elevation was 351 feet (107 m) and as recorded in 1979 was 387 feet (118 m), difference of 36 feet (11 m) Gannett, Henry, ed. (1906). "A Dictionary of Altitudes in the United States (Department of the Interior USGS Bulletin No. 274)". U.S. Government Printing Office. "Gravel Switch ID 493181". U.S. Geological Survey: Geographic Names Information Service (1976-1981). September 20, 1979.)

== See also ==
- Railroad switch
- Siding (rail)
