= Maysville and Lexington Railroad =

Railroad company in Virginia

The Maysville and Lexington Railroad was a 19th-century railway company in Kentucky in the United States, connecting Maysville on the Ohio River with Lexington at the center of the state.

It operated from 1850 to 1856, when it failed. It was subsequently re-established as two separate companies – a Northern and a Southern division, in 1868. Both were eventually incorporated into the L&N and today make up part of the CSX Transportation system.

== See also ==
- List of Kentucky railroads
