= Cherokee Gardens, Louisville =

Residential area in Kentucky, United States

Coordinates: 38.24560°N 85.67750°W

Cherokee Gardens is a residential area six miles east of downtown Louisville, Kentucky, US. The area is a collection of small, unconnected subdivisions along Lexington Road and large estates built just outside Cherokee Park.

Many of Louisville's early 20th Century elite lived in the area, drawn there by the large, undeveloped parcels of land near downtown. Most houses in the area were built from the 1920s to the 1950s, several being designed by noted Louisville residential architect Stratton Hammon.

Cherokee Gardens is bounded by Lexington Road, Cannons Lane, and I-64. As of 2000, the population of Cherokee Gardens was 927.

== History ==
The area was deeded to James Southall and Richard Charlton for their part in the French and Indian War. The land remained untouched well into the 1850s because it lay off Frankfort Avenue and Bardstown Road, the two major through routes of the area. In 1851 an alternative route of Frankfort Ave was built for travellers who wanted to avoid the railroad further down in Clifton. The new road was first called 'Shelbyville Branch', today it is called Lexington Road.

The first subdivision called Cherokee Gardens was announced in 1925 by the firm of Otis & Bruce. Jr. it was built on land that had been a part of the Vigilini and Turner estates, with the Olmsted Brothers firm hired to design the landscaping. The lots were sold quickly, with 241 of the original 256 lots selling within 10 days of their initial offering for over $900,000 (equivalent to $16,136,812 in 2024). Many of these lots were combined by initial homeowners.

The initial Cherokee Gardens subdivision consisted of homes built in the 1920s and 1930s off the streets, from west to east, Primrose, Fairfield, Barberry, Rainbow, Garden, Poppy, Sunset and Sunnyside. West of that, Cressbrook was developed in 1955. The homes off Daneshall Drive were built in 1968, in a small subdivision named for the original house which still stands, and was a well-known horse farm into the 1950s. Cherokee Gardens West, with homes off Altagate and Circlewood on the old Speed Estate, was built in 1970. Cherokee Woods subdivision, built off the road of that name and Juniper Hill Road, was built in 1974.
