= Louisville and Indiana Railroad =

American Class III freight railroad

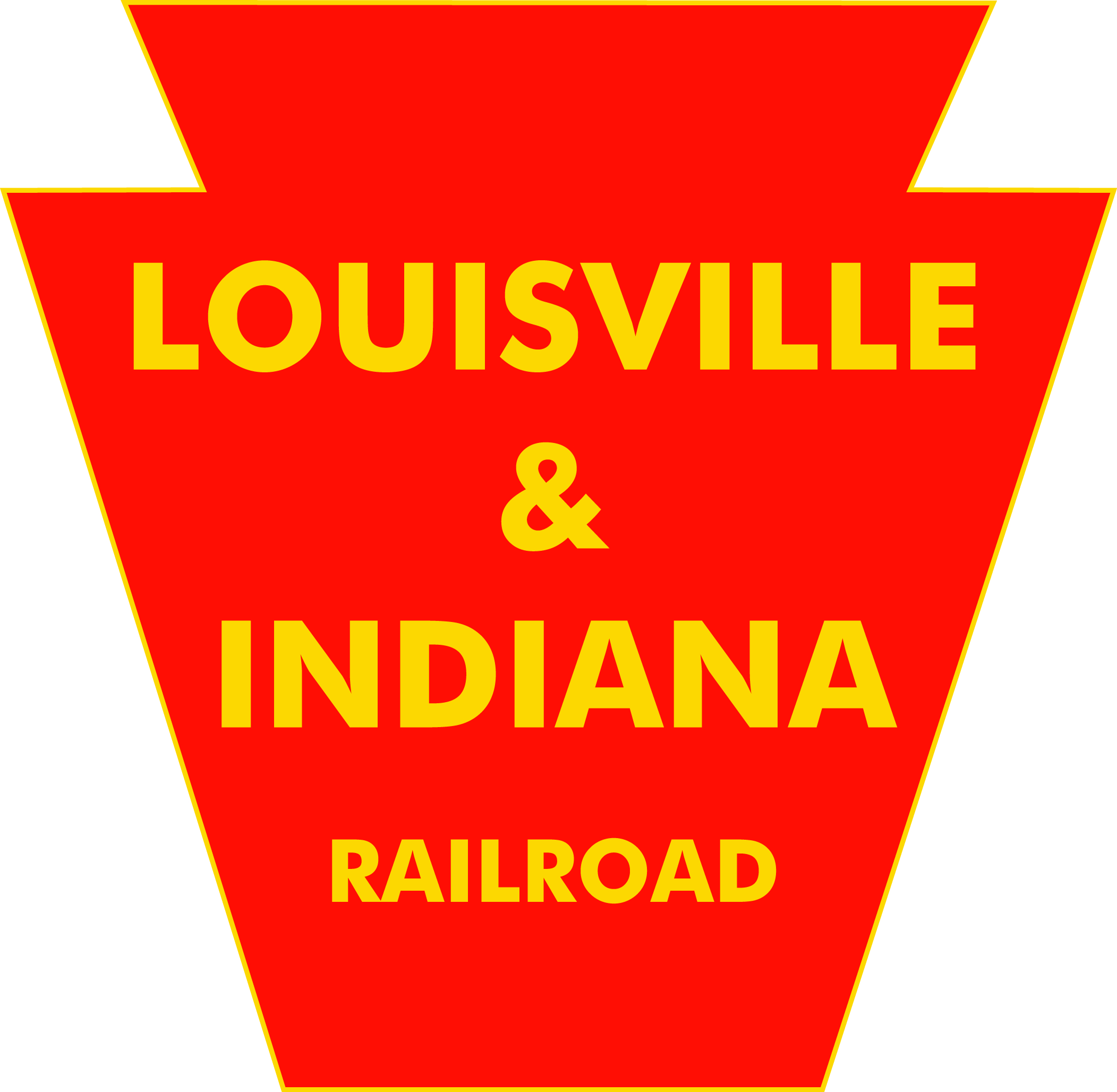

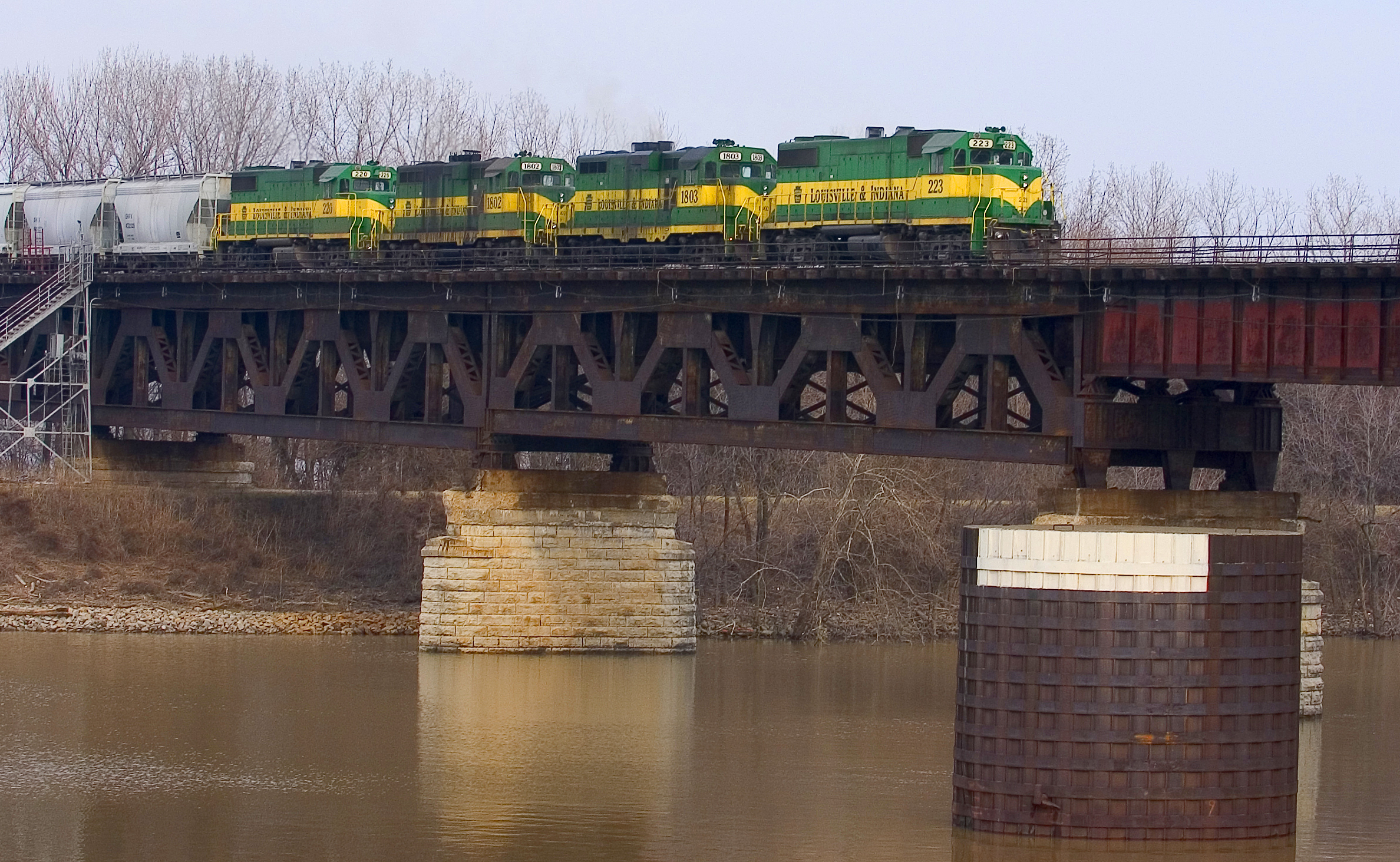
- Louisville & Indiana train entering Louisville, KY on the Fourteenth Street Bridge

Overview
- Headquarters: Jeffersonville, Indiana
- Reporting mark: LIRC
- Locale: Indiana and Kentucky
- Dates of operation: 1994–

Technical
- Track gauge: 4 ft 8 1/2 in (1,435 mm) standard gauge

Other
- Website: www.anacostia.com/railroads/lirc

The Louisville and Indiana Railroad (reporting mark LIRC) is a Class III railroad that operates freight service between Indianapolis, Indiana and Louisville, Kentucky, with a major yard and maintenance shop in Jeffersonville, Indiana. It is owned by Anacostia Rail Holdings.

The 106-mile (171 km) line was purchased from Conrail in March 1994. Previously, it was owned by Penn Central, and before that, the Pennsylvania Railroad. It serves the cities of Franklin, Sellersburg, Seymour and Columbus, Indiana, and also serves the former Clark Maritime Center, now Port of Indiana, Jeffersonville. In Louisville, the LIRC interchanges with the Paducah and Louisville Railway and CSX Transportation. In Indianapolis, the LIRC interchanges with the Indiana Rail Road at the Senate Avenue Terminal.

The Louisville and Indiana Railroad acquired the remaining assets of Southern Indiana Railway in May 2022. The SIR had ceased operations in 2020, and the purchase opened up a new connection to CSX along with the opportunity for the LIRC to add additional rail-served customers in the future.
