= Rockcastle River Railway =

Railway line in Kentucky, US

The Rockcastle River Railway was a line created in 1915 by the Bond Foley lumber company to extract timber from Jackson County, Kentucky. It intersected the Louisville and Nashville Railroad line at East Bernstadt, Kentucky.
