= Indiana Rail Road =

American railroad

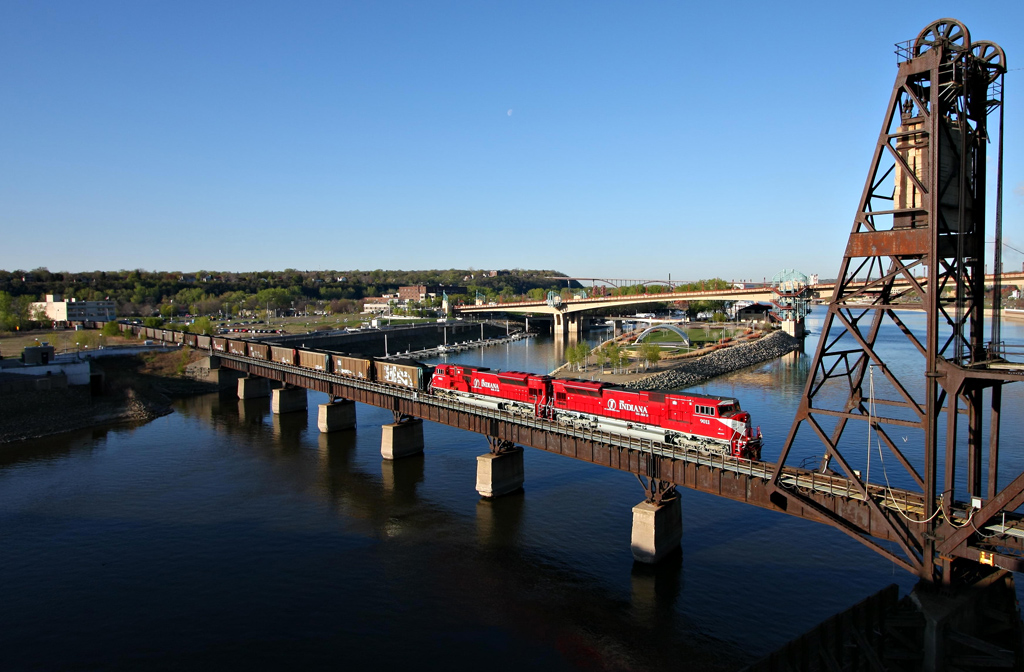
- An Indiana Rail Road train crossing the CGW Robert Street draw in 2012

Overview
- Headquarters: Indianapolis, Indiana
- Reporting mark: INRD
- Locale: Illinois, Indiana
- Dates of operation: 1986–present

Technical
- Track gauge: 1,435 mm (4 ft 8 1/2 in) (standard gauge)
- Length: 225 miles owned

Other
- Website: www.inrd.com

The Indiana Rail Road (reporting mark INRD) is a United States Class II railroad, originally operating over former Illinois Central Railroad trackage from Newton, Illinois, to Indianapolis, Indiana, a distance of 155 miles (249 km).

This line, now known as the Indiana Rail Road's Indianapolis Subdivision, comprises most of the former IC/ICG line from Indianapolis to Effingham, Illinois; Illinois Central successor Canadian National Railway retains the portion from Newton to Effingham. INRD also owns a former Milwaukee Road line from Terre Haute, Indiana, to Burns City, Indiana (site of the Crane Naval Surface Warfare Center), with trackage rights extending to Chicago, Illinois.

INRD no longer serves Louisville, Kentucky, and the Port of Indiana on the Ohio River at Jeffersonville, Indiana, through a haulage agreement with the Louisville & Indiana Railroad (LIRC).

== Overview ==
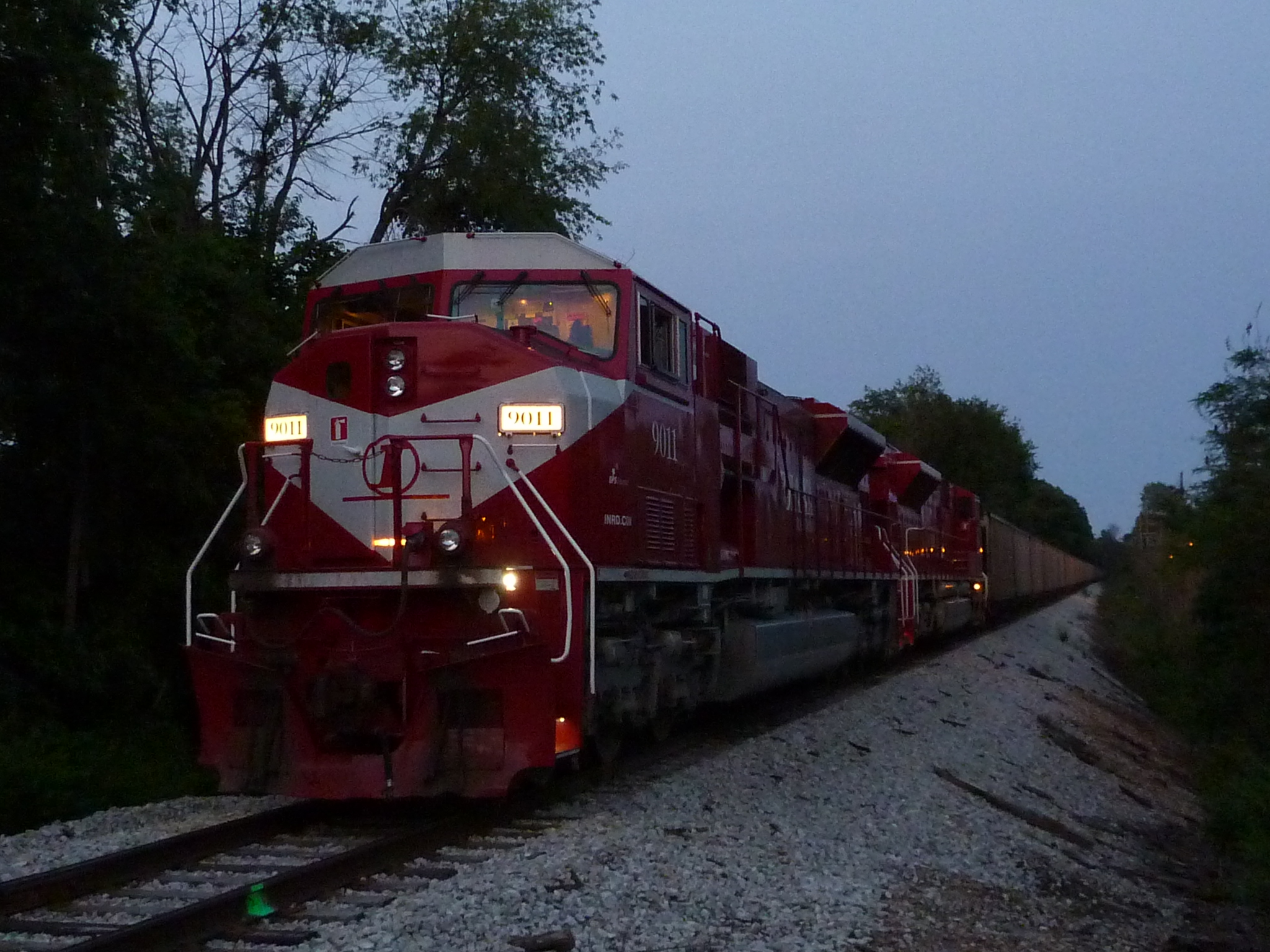
An Indiana Rail Road train in Bloomington, on the line coming from Morgantown

The company was formed in 1986 by entrepreneur Thomas Hoback, who retired as president and chief executive officer in 2015. CSX Transportation now owns a majority interest in the parent company. The company's executive and administrative offices are located in downtown Indianapolis.

In May 2006, INRD completed the purchase of the Canadian Pacific Railway line from Terre Haute to Bedford, Indiana, the former Milwaukee Road/Soo Line Railroad Latta Subdivision, now known as INRD's Chicago Subdivision, which crosses the Indianapolis Subdivision at grade at Linton, Indiana. The former Latta Sub was isolated from the rest of the CPR, and was reached from Chicago via trackage rights over CSX Transportation's former Chicago and Eastern Illinois Railroad line; further trackage rights over CSX's former Monon from Bedford to Louisville, Kentucky (negotiated as part of the Monon's merger with CSX predecessor Louisville and Nashville Railroad in 1971) allowed the CPR access into the Bluegrass State.

These trackage rights were transferred to the Indiana Rail Road as part of the sale, bringing INRD's total route structure to approximately 500 miles (800 km). The company also operates the remnants of the Monon Railroad in and around Bloomington, Indiana, and has trackage rights over other lines in and around Indianapolis, with a classification yard, shops and main transloading facility located on the city's near south side at the Senate Avenue Terminal (between I-70 and the Indianapolis Union Railway's Belt Line).

Additional INRD classification yards are located at Palestine, Illinois, and Jasonville, Indiana. The latter facility, known as Hiawatha (in tribute to original owner Milwaukee Road's crack passenger trains) is also home to the main locomotive servicing facility.

The INRD primarily hauls coal from Indiana mines to electric generating plants along the line. Appliances, grain, plastics, aggregates and food products comprise other freight hauled. Major customers include Indianapolis Power & Light, Ameren, Hoosier Energy, Duke Energy, Lincoland AgriEnergy (ethanol), Marathon Oil, Hershey Foods, General Electric, Mont Eagle Mills, PolyOne Corporation, Bemis Plastics. On March 18, 2009, the railroad announced that it would build a new 5.2-mile (8.4 km) rail spur in Sullivan County, Indiana, for the new Bear Run coal mine. Bear Run is being developed by Peabody Coal and is expected to produce more than 8 million tons annually.

Long abandoned and now removed was a connection to Union Station. Tracks once ran between Senate Avenue (originally known as Mississippi Street) and Missouri Street north from this terminal's location through the present-day site of Lucas Oil Stadium. A remnant of this connection can still be noted today in the unusual height of I-70's overpass above West and Missouri streets, which when the freeway was built in the early 1970s had to also pass over the once active rail line.

== Routes ==
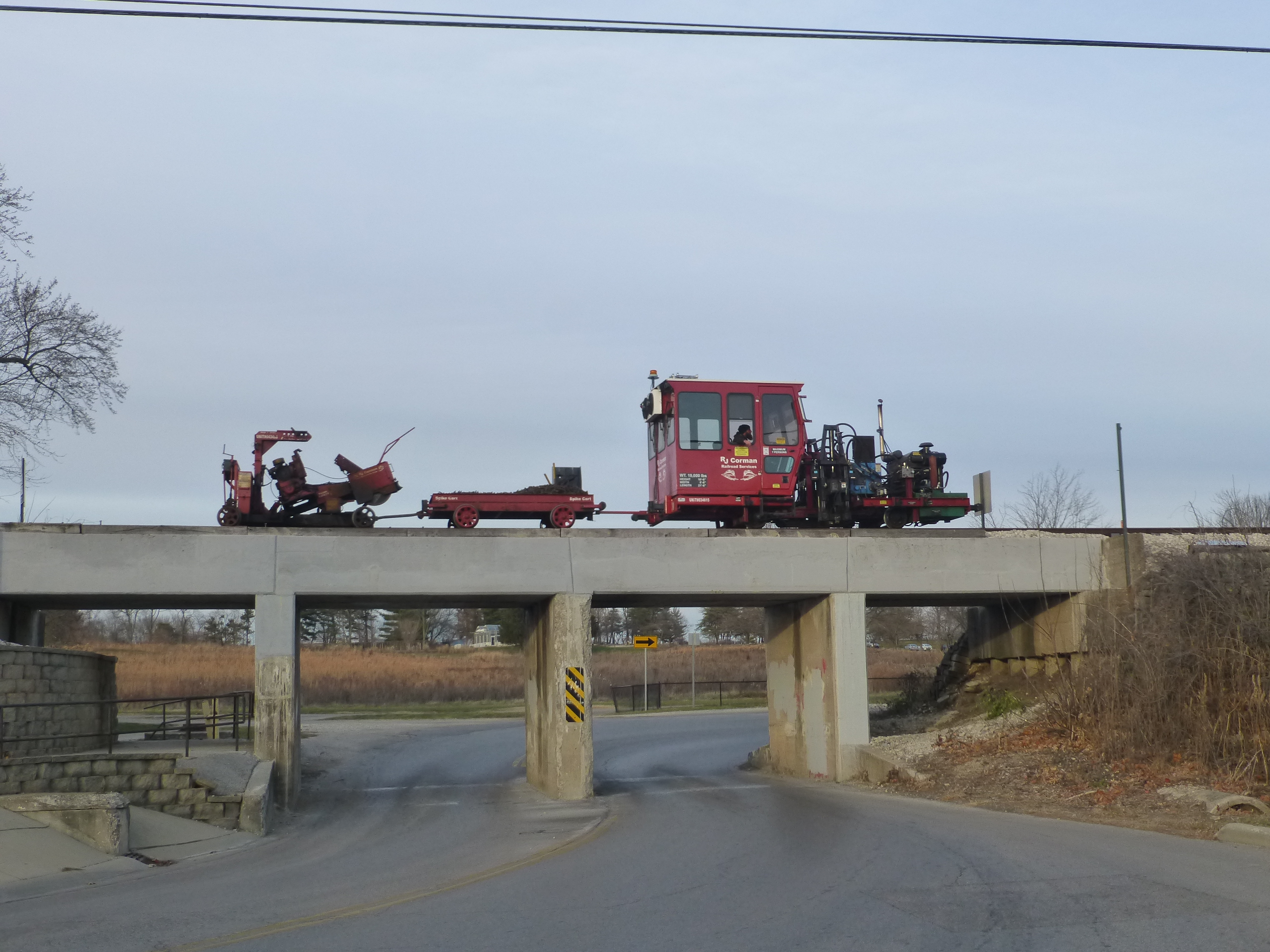
Maintenance equipment traveling on the tracks of the Indiana Rail Road in Bloomington, IN

The Soo Line Railroad abandoned a section of the line between Bedford and Seymour, Indiana, as soon as they took over the Milwaukee Road in 1986. The Canadian Pacific Railway operated on the Chicago–Bedford line from their acquisition of the Soo Line until 2006, when they spun it off to the Indiana Rail Road company. On December 18, 2009, it was decided to cut the southern part of that line even more, as they are abandoning between Bedford and Crane, a total distance of 21.15 miles (34.04 km).

== Intermodal terminal ==
The Indiana Rail Road operates the Senate Avenue Intermodal Terminal, located southwest of downtown Indianapolis. In cooperation with the Canadian National Railway, it provides container service between Indianapolis and Canada's ports of Halifax, Nova Scotia, Vancouver and Prince Rupert, for connection with global shipping. Opened in 2013, the terminal moved 1,450 containers during its first year of operations. In the fall of 2021, it was expected that the terminal would move over 40,000 containers during the year. An expansion project started in 2021, and is expected to be completed in 2023.

== Locomotive roster ==
As of July 2025, the INRD's roster consisted of the following, all built by EMD:

| Model | Numbers | Built | Notes |
|---|---|---|---|
| GP40M-2 | 3001–3002 | 1967–1970 | Rebuilt from GP40s by Morrison-Knudsen in 1991. |
| GP38 | 3801 | 1969 | In storage. |
| GP38-2 | 3802–3808 | 1978–1979 | |
| SD40-2 | 4001–4006 | 1980 | |
| SD60 | 6004, 6006–07, 6009, 6013, 6016–18 | 1987 | |
| GP40-2 | 6498 | 1980 | |
| EMD SD70M | 7001–7010 | 2003 | originally from Norfolk Southern Railway |
| SD9043MAC | 9001, 9004–05, 9007, 9009, 9011, 9013 | 1999 | Built with 4300 hp engines instead of standard 6000 hp. |

| Preceded by CSAO | Regional Railroad of the Year; 2018 | Succeeded by RCPE |
