= Hardin Southern Railroad =

Overview
- Reporting mark: HSRR
- Locale: Hardin, Kentucky, USA
- Dates of operation: –2005
- Successor: KWT Railway

Technical
- Track gauge: 4 ft 8 1/2 in (1,435 mm) standard gauge

Other
- Website: hsrr.com

The Hardin Southern Railroad (reporting mark HSRR) was a short line freight and tourist railroad located in Hardin, Kentucky. In 2005, the Murray-Calloway Economic Development Corporation bought the former line and leased it to the KWT Railway for the purpose of serving the Murray Industrial Park in Murray.

A passenger train operated over this line until 2005. The equipment used included an EMD SW1 which was sent to Knoxville Locomotive Works in Knoxville, Tennessee. The passenger cars and a Chessie System C27A caboose went to the Tennessee Valley Railroad Museum in Chattanooga, Tennessee, and Norfolk Southern, with the caboose ending up on the Black River & Western Railroad in Ringoes, New Jersey.

Most of the trackage of the former Hardin Southern Railroad was removed in August 2009.
