= Pine Mountain Railroad =

- Origin: Knoxville, Tennessee, United States
- Genre: Bluegrass
- Years active: 1998–2006
- Labels: CMH Records; Copper Moon Records; TrakTone Records

Pine Mountain Railroad was an American contemporary bluegrass band based out of Knoxville, Tennessee co-founded by banjoist and baritone singer Kipper Stitt, guitarist and lead singer Jimbo Whaley, and tenor/lead singer and bassist Mike Gwen in 1998. Over the years, it featured an array of singers, fiddle players, bassists, guitarists, mandolinists, and resonator guitar players, along with multiple guest musicians. They released six albums: three independent, one with Copper Moon Records, one with CMH Records, and one with TrakTone Records. They received several nominations and awards from organizations such as the International Bluegrass Music Association and the California Bluegrass Association, and several of their songs placed on the gospel and bluegrass charts.

== History ==
In 1998, Kipper Stitt, then a Group Sales Manager for Dolly Parton's Stampede (known at the time as Dixie Stampede), attended a meeting for the Pigeon Forge Convention and Visitors Bureau. The meeting was to plan for an upcoming dinner they were hosting at the upcoming American Bus Association National Convention in Milwaukee, Wisconsin. During the meeting, Stitt gave the suggestion that he plays the banjo and if anyone else plays the guitar, they could play some bluegrass music at the dinner. Mike Gwen, who was there representing Mainstay Suites, said that he played guitar and sang and his friend Jimbo Whaley, who was also attending the meeting, also sometimes performed with him at church. Following the convention, they continued to play together and began performing shows. In 2001, they were sponsored by sausage company Odom's Tennessee Pride and were heard weekly on the Grand Ole Opry performing their theme song. In March 2006, Pine Mountain Railroad released their final album, Heartache & Hope, produced by bass player Missy Raines.

Pine Mountain Railroad was a two-time nominee for International Bluegrass Music Association Emerging Artist of the Year in 2003 and 2004, and was awarded California Bluegrass Association Emerging Artist of the Year in 2002. They traveled to several countries, including the United States, Canada, Mexico, and the Bahamas. Their music has also been featured on the CBS show Training Day.

== Members ==
Name	Instrument	Vocal
Kipper Stitt	Banjo	Baritone
Mike Gwen	Bass	Tenor
Jimbo Whaley	Guitar	Lead
Jimmy Sims	Fiddle	None
Mike McCoig	Bass	None
Sonny Brock	Mandolin	Tenor
Bill McBee	Bass	Bass
Roscoe Morgan	Mandolin	Tenor
Samuel "Clint" Damewood	Fiddle	Tenor
Danny Barnes	Mandolin	Tenor
Jerry Butler	Guitar	Lead
Michael Fagan	Fiddle	None
Matt DeSpain	Resonator guitar	Lead, Tenor, Baritone
Cody Shuler	Mandolin	Lead
Matt Flake	Fiddle	Bass

== Discography ==
Album	Record Label	Release
Full Throttle!	Independent	1998
Pine Mountain Railroad	Independent	2000
Live! at the Old Country Church	Independent	2001
Knoxville Train	Copper Moon Records	2002
The Old Radio	CMH Records	2003
Heartache & Hope	TrakTone Records	March 15, 2005
