= Owensboro and Russellville Railroad =

The Owensboro and Russellville Railroad was a 19th-century railway company in western Kentucky in the United States. It operated from 1867 to 1873, when it was merged into the Evansville, Owensboro and Nashville Railroad. Its former rights-of-way currently form parts of the class-I CSX Transportation railway.

It connected with the Elizabethtown and Paducah (subsequently part of the Illinois Central and now the Paducah and Louisville Railway) at Central City in Muhlenberg County.

== See also ==
- List of Kentucky railroads
