= Western Kentucky Railway =

Railway line in United States of America

Overview
- Headquarters: Sturgis, Kentucky
- Reporting mark: WKRL
- Locale: Western Kentucky
- Dates of operation: 1995–2010

Technical
- Track gauge: 4 ft 8 1/2 in (1,435 mm) standard gauge

The Western Kentucky Railway (reporting mark WKRL) was a shortline railroad in Kentucky, that connected coal mines with CSX Transportation at Providence. The lines were part of the Illinois Central Gulf Railroad until March 1982, when Costain Coal, Inc. bought the trackage and set up the Tradewater Railway (reporting mark TWRY) to operate it. In January 1995, the Rail Management and Consulting Corporation acquired the property and transferred it to the new Western Kentucky Railway. Genesee & Wyoming Inc. acquired it from the Rail Management Corporation in 2005. In 2010, WKRL abandoned all of its remaining lines north of Providence, and the rails were removed shortly after. The only remaining tracks that were originally owned by WKRL are operated by Martin Marrieta Aggregates' Fredonia Valley Railroad from Princeton to Fredonia.

When created in 1995, the Western Kentucky Railway owned lines from Providence to a junction at Blackford, and from Blackford north to Waverly and south to the Paducah and Louisville Railway at Princeton. Most of the north–south line, once the main line of the Ohio Valley Railway (an Illinois Central Railroad predecessor) was abandoned in 1995 and 1996, leaving only the piece between Blackford and Dekoven. (The Fredonia Valley Railroad later acquired the section from Princeton to Fredonia.)The rest of the line was then abandoned in 2010 and removed from Providence to Wheatcroft and the surrounding mines.
