= Glasgow Railway =

American Railway Line

The Glasgow Railway (formally, the Glasgow Railway Company, Inc.) is an American short-line railroad whose line runs from Park City to Glasgow, Kentucky.

Though independently owned by the Robert Lessenberry family of Glasgow, the line is operated under long-term lease by CSX Transportation, as corporate successor to the Louisville and Nashville Railroad. As such, the company has no locomotives or operable rolling stock, and apparently has noreporting mark assigned to it.

The Glasgow Railway connects its namesake city with the former L&N's namesake main line at Park City, which itself was formerly named Glasgow Junction.

== History ==
The line began as the Barren County Railroad Company, and was built in 1856, with the intention of connecting with the L&N, then itself under construction. According to Lessenberry, county leaders raised taxes to fund the line, which angered resident of the eastern portion of the county. That portion seceded and eventually became part of neighboring Metcalfe County.

That company was sold to three local businessmen, including prominent attorney William Logan Porter, in 1868 and renamed the Glasgow Railroad Company. The men later sold the line to the Glasgow Railway Company in 1899.

== Current ==
The only surviving rolling stock of the Glasgow Railway is passenger car 109, which is one of only a handful of such cars in a Jim Crow configuration remaining in existence. The car is in an advanced state of decay, despite various efforts to save it over the years, and sat on a siding near the line's terminus in Glasgow for decades. In 2011, the car was moved to The Historic Railpark and Train Museum in nearby Bowling Green, where efforts are underway to restore the car. It was used on the daily (sometimes twice-daily) mixed train that ran from Glasgow to the L&N connection.

The line is freight-only, serving numerous factories in Glasgow. It once used a ramp for piggyback service, whose main customer was a local moving company; the ramp was literally the end of the line, adjacent to a city street.

The only structure on the line is the freight station at Glasgow. A passenger station was once located at the community of Oil City.

For a brief period in the 1990s, the Glasgow Railway hosted a tourist train using an EMD SD9 locomotive that was notable for being specially ballasted for use on the steep grade at Madison, Indiana on the former Pennsylvania Railroad (now the Madison Railroad).
