= Squaw Creek Southern Railroad =

Squaw Creek Southern

Overview
- Headquarters: Newburgh, IN
- Reporting mark: SCS, RRC
- Locale: Southern Indiana
- Dates of operation: 2007–present

Technical
- Track gauge: 4 ft 8 1/2 in (1,435 mm) standard gauge
- Length: 21.6 miles (34.8 km)

Other
- Website: scsrailroad.com

The Squaw Creek Southern Railroad (reporting mark SCS) is a Class III railroad subsidiary of Respondek Railroad operating in the southern portion of the State of Indiana. Originally, the Squaw Creek Southern started operating 21 miles of former Yankeetown Dock Corporation/Peabody Coal trackage owned by Norfolk Southern, but has since started servicing Foresight Energy's Sitran Coal Terminal near Evansville, Indiana and SABIC's Innovative Plastics plant in Mount Vernon, Indiana.

== History ==
In 2003, Norfolk Southern bought 21.6 miles of former Peabody Coal Company/Yankeetown Dock Corporation (AMAX Coal) trackage and spurs from Lynnville, Indiana, to Yankeetown Indiana. In 2007, the Squaw Creek Southern acquired trackage rights from Norfolk Southern from 0.0 BY (Yankeetown) and 21.6 BY (Lynnville Mine), and since then, has done the loading at Alcoa's Liberty Mine north of Boonville, and unloading at Alcoa's Warrick Operations, as well as Yankeetown Docks.

== Locomotive roster ==
Squaw Creek Southern #20 and #21

- RRC 11, EMD SD35 rebuild from EMD SDP35
- RRC 20, EMD SD38-2
- RRC 21, EMD SD38-2
- RRC 415 EMD GP7 Former Peabody Coal #415
- RRC 1001 EMD GP7 Former Peabody Coal #1001
- RRC 4139 EMD GP7

=== Former ===
- RRC 8795; EMD SD40T-2; Former Union Pacific and Southern Pacific. Sold to Wheeling And Lake Erie Railway and continues to operate as WE 5411.
- RRC 204 EMD SD9 Former Algers, Winslow and Western Railway and CofG #204 Scrapped in March 2020.

== See also ==
Port Harbor Railroad - Sister Company
