= C&O Railroad Bridge =

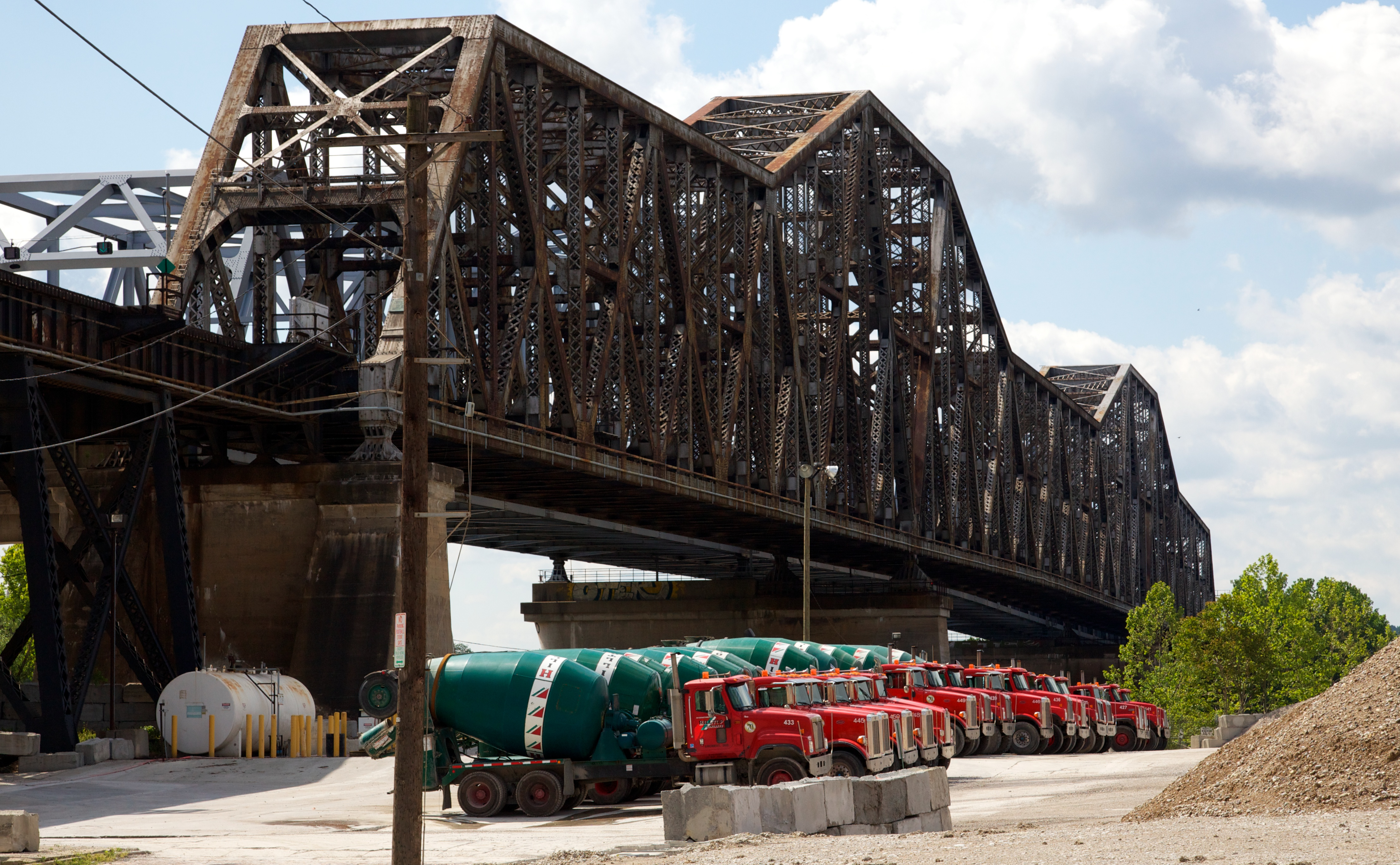
- The C&O Railroad Bridge looking southeast from Mehring Way in Cincinnati.
- Coordinates: 39.09151°N 84.519643°W
- Carries: 2 tracks of CSX Transportation Cincinnati Terminal Subdivision
- Crosses: Ohio River
- Locale: Covington, Kentucky, and Cincinnati, Ohio

Characteristics
- Design: Cantilever bridge
- Longest span: 206 metres (676 ft)

History
- Opened: 1889 original, 1929 rebuilt

The C&O Railroad bridge is a cantilever truss bridge carrying the CSX Transportation Cincinnati Terminal Subdivision over the Ohio River. It was the first railroad bridge connecting Cincinnati, Ohio, and Covington, Kentucky.

The bridge was originally built between 1886 and 1889 by a predecessor of the Chesapeake and Ohio Railway. The bridge cost $3,348,675, an enormous sum. By 1929 it was obsolete, and a replacement was built on extended piers immediately adjacent to the original structure. This new bridge was given the same name as the original and is still in use, carrying the CSX Railroad (the C&O's successor) across the river. The original bridge was sold to the Commonwealth of Kentucky and retrofitted as an automobile bridge. In 1970 that converted original bridge was pulled off its piers by two tug boats thus falling into the Ohio River below, the northern pier was extended, and the Clay Wade Bailey Bridge was built on that and the remaining preexisting piers.

== See also ==
- List of bridges documented by the Historic American Engineering Record in Kentucky
- List of bridges documented by the Historic American Engineering Record in Ohio
