= Evansville, Owensboro and Nashville Railroad =

The Evansville, Owensboro and Nashville Railroad was a 19th-century railway company in western Kentucky in the United States. As of 1880, the railroad passed north and south through Daviess County and McLean County, into Muhlenberg County, Kentucky, but had not yet been completed,

On January 14, 1880, the railroad filed for consolidation with Owensboro and Nashville Railroad and Owensboro and Russellville Railroad.

== See also ==
- List of Kentucky railroads
