= Louisville Southern Railroad =

19th-century railway company in the U.S

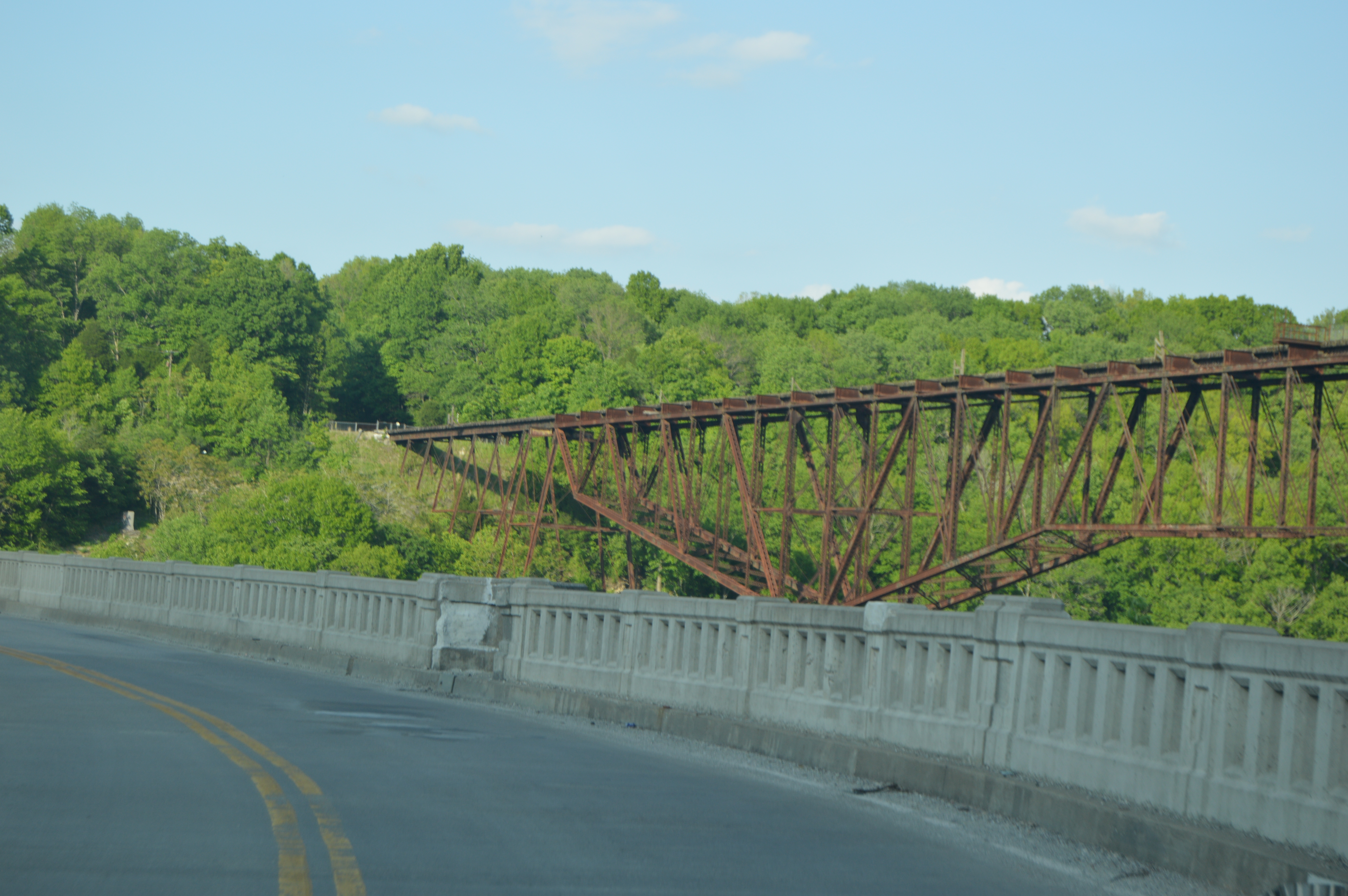
The Tyrone Bridge, by which the LS crossed the Kentucky River

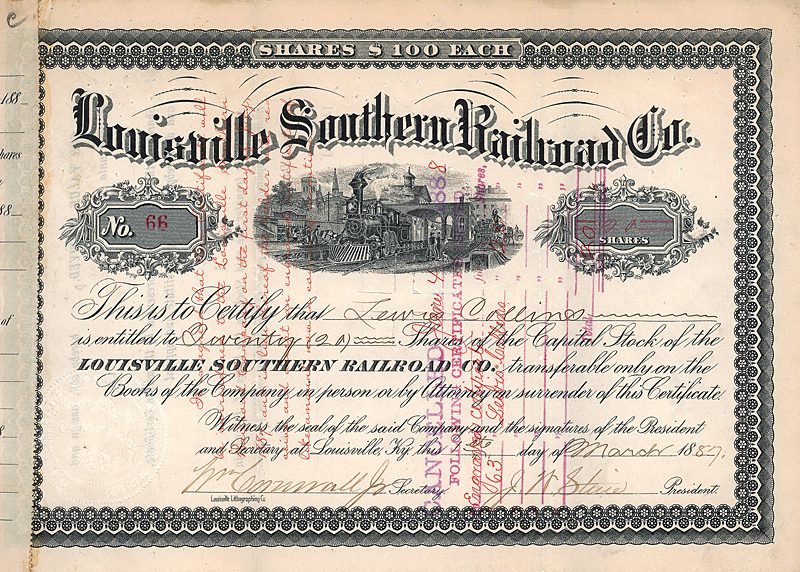
Share of the Louisville Southern Railroad Co. from the 1st March 1887

The Louisville Southern Railroad (abbreviated: LS) was a 19th-century railway company in the U.S. state of Kentucky. It operated from 1884 (141 years ago) until 1894 (131 years ago), when it was incorporated into the Southern Railway in Kentucky.

Originally incorporated as the Louisville, Harrodsburg and Virginia Railroad in 1868, no track was laid until the early 1880s. When the Louisville, New Albany and Chicago Railway was chartered in 1882 and began an attempt to challenge the L&N's access to the Eastern Kentucky Coalfields, the LH&V was reörganized as the Louisville Southern and hired the LNA&C's president, Louisvillian Bennett Young. Construction commenced in 1884 and ran from Louisville through Shelbyville and Lawrenceburg to Harrodsburg, which was reached in 1888. A spur was constructed to Burgin, where the Louisville Southern joined the Cincinnati Southern's mainline.

In 1888, the Louisville Southern also began a spur from Lawrenceburg to Versailles and Lexington. It then purchased the Versailles and Midway and initiated service to Georgetown. The line to Lexington crossed the Kentucky River at Tyrone by means of the 1,625-foot (495 m) Young's High Bridge and initiated service in October 1889.

Within Louisville, the LS leased the track and facilities of the Kentucky and Indiana Bridge and Railroad Company: passengers boarded and disembarked at Central Station on Seventh Street and cargo was loaded and unloaded at the K&I's West End yard. The Louisville Southern in turn was leased by the LNA&C from 1889 to March 1890. The East Tennessee, Virginia and Georgia Railway later leased both the Cincinnati Southern and the Louisville Southern and all three were merged into the Southern system in 1894.

The Louisville Southern's former rights-of-way currently form parts of the Class I Norfolk Southern system.

== See also ==
- Lexington Extension of the Louisville Southern Railroad
- List of Kentucky railroads
