= Owensboro and Nashville Railway =

Former railway company

The Owensboro and Nashville Railway was a 19th- and early-20th-century railway company in western Kentucky in the United States. It operated from 1881, when it purchased the defunct Owensboro & Nashville and Tennessee & Kentucky railroads, until 1921, when it was purchased by the L&N. Its former rights-of-way currently form parts of the class-I CSX Transportation railway.

It connected with the Paducah and Elizabethtown and its successors (all subsequently part of the Illinois Central) at Central City in Muhlenberg County.

== See also ==
- List of Kentucky railroads
