= Central City, Kentucky =

- City
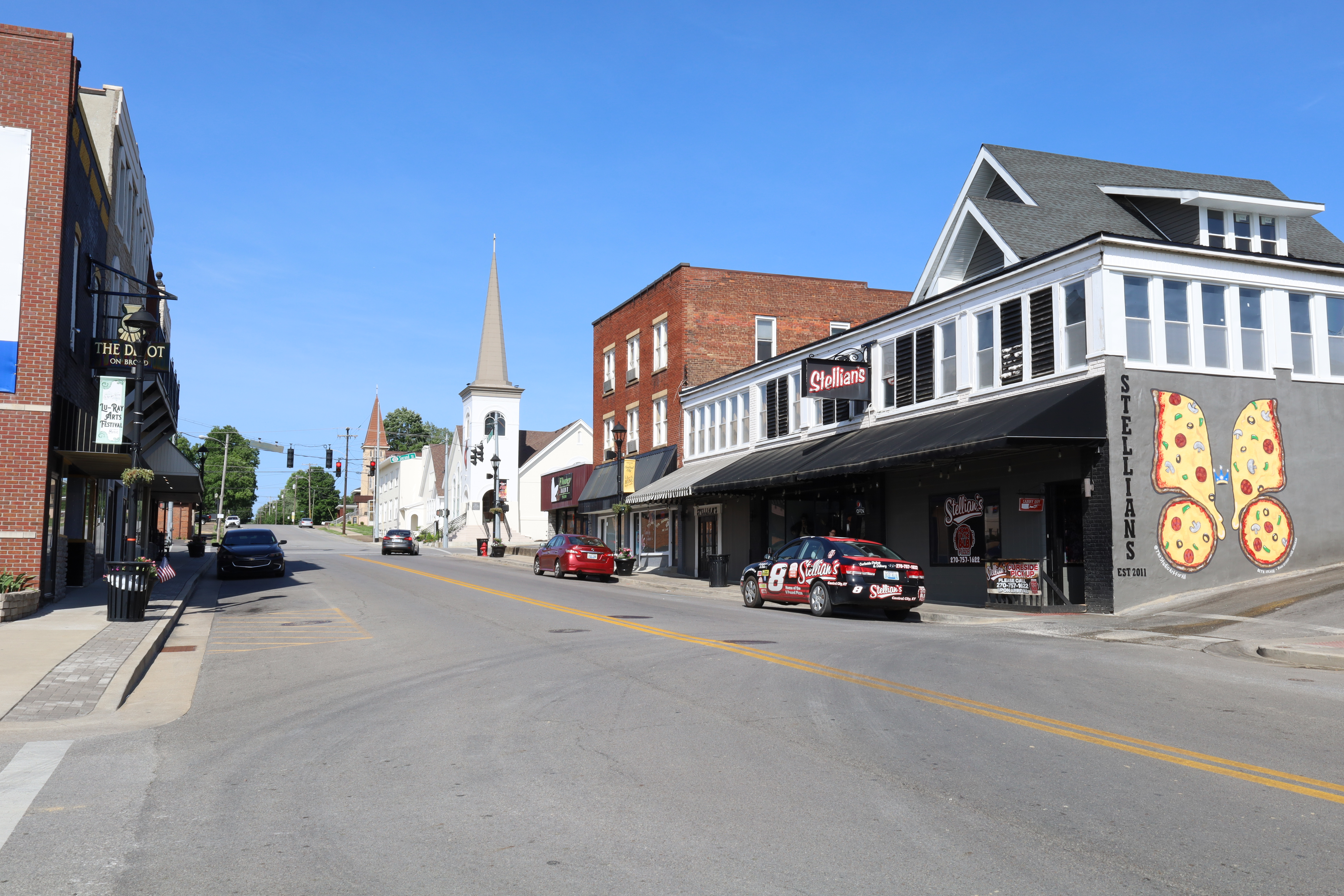
- Downtown in 2022

- Flag Seal
- Motto: "Where the opportunities are endless and the music never ends"
- Location in Muhlenberg County, Kentucky
- Coordinates: 37°17′42″N 87°7′43″W
- Country: United States
- State: Kentucky
- County: Muhlenberg
- Established: Morehead's Horse Mill, 1826
- Incorporated: Stroud City, 1873
- Incorporated: Central City, 1882

Government
  - Type: Mayor-City Administrator- City Council
  - Mayor: Tony Armour

Area
  - Total: 5.25 sq mi (13.59 km^{2})
  - Land: 5.24 sq mi (13.56 km^{2})
  - Water: 0.012 sq mi (0.03 km^{2})
- Elevation: 436 ft (133 m)

Population (2020)
  - Total: 5,819
  - Estimate (2024): 5,744
  - Density: 1,111.2/sq mi (429.05/km^{2})
- Time zone: UTC-6 (CST)
  - Summer (DST): UTC-5 (CDT)
- ZIP Code: 42330
- Area codes: 270 & 364
- FIPS code: 21-13978
- GNIS feature ID: 0489282
- Website: https://www.centralcityky.org/

Central City is a home rule-class city in Muhlenberg County, Kentucky, in the United States. The population was 5,819 at the 2020 census. It is the largest city in the county and the principal community in the Central City Micropolitan Statistical Area, which includes all of Muhlenberg County.

== History ==
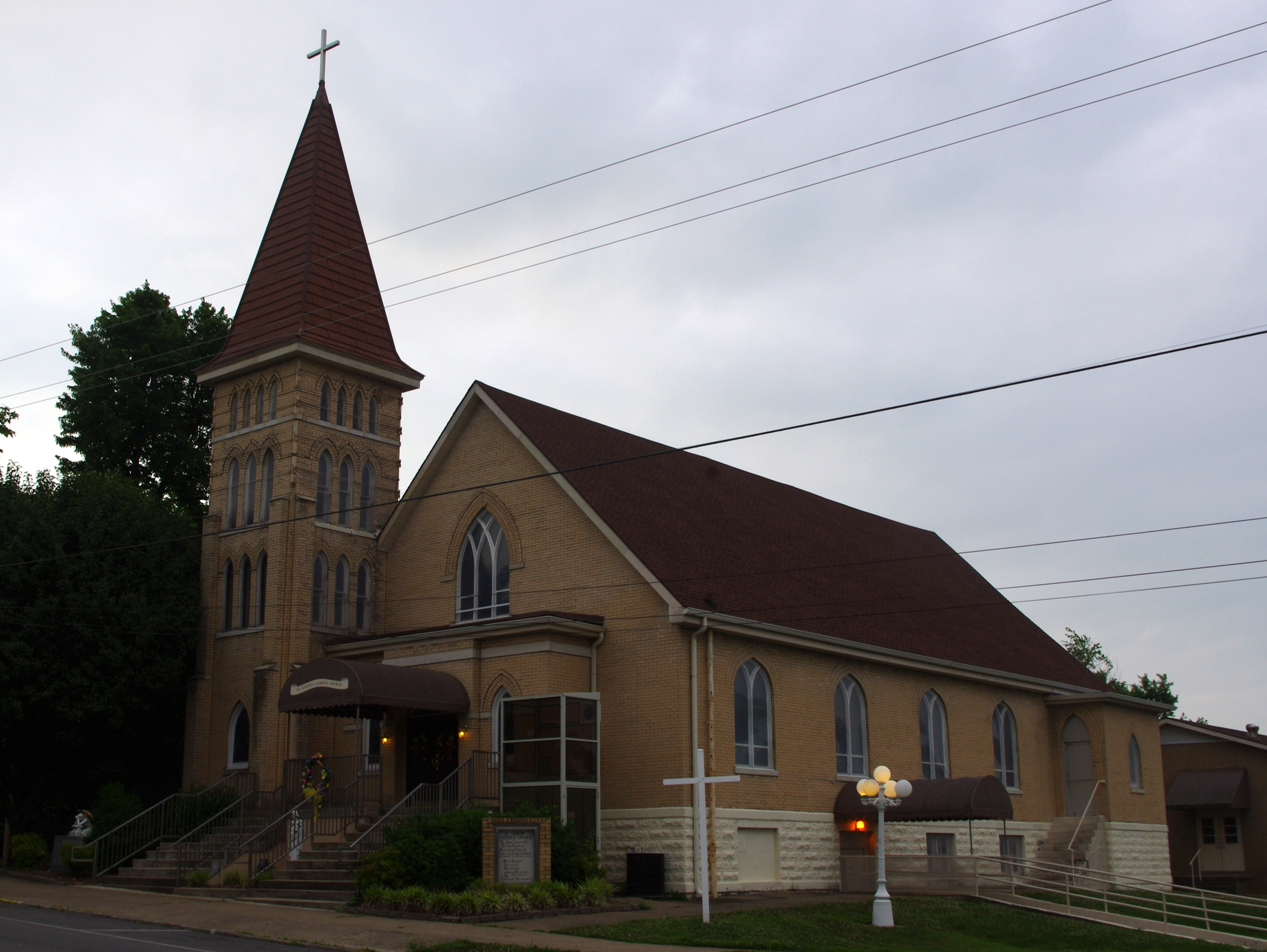
St. Joseph's Catholic Church on Broad Street

The site of present-day Central City was originally known as "Morehead's Horse Mill" after local resident Charles S. Morehead's steam-powered gristmill. A larger community began to develop after the 1870 advent of the Elizabethtown and Paducah Railroad. A post office was constructed the next year in 1871 and called "Owensboro Junction" after the projected 1872 completion of the Owensboro and Russellville Railroad. By 1873, the settlement was large enough to be incorporated by the state legislature as "Stroud City", after local landowner John Stroud.

The same year, however, the du Ponts' Central Coal and Iron Company began operation in the area and became so vital to the local economy that the city was reincorporated in 1882 as "Central City". Recessions replaced the E&P and the O&R with a procession of different companies, including the Owensboro and Nashville Railway, but the two rights of way always remained in separate hands, keeping Central City an important regional hub for the Illinois Central and the L&N, with train yards, roundhouses, and even an elevated rail station. Coal was mined from nearby fields, prompting explosions such as one in 1912 that killed five workers.

The expansion of automotive traffic in the early 20th century reduced some of Central City's importance, but it continues to service mainline freight traffic on the Paducah and Louisville Railway and trunk-line service for CSX from Madisonville to the Paradise Combined Cycle Plant, minutes south of the city.

== Geography ==
Central City is located in northeastern Muhlenberg County at 37°17′42″N 87°07′43″W (37.294989, -87.128622). The Western Kentucky Parkway runs along the southern edge of the city, with access from Exit 58 (U.S. Route 431). The parkway leads northeast 80 miles (130 km) to Elizabethtown and west 57 miles (92 km) to Eddyville. U.S. Route 62 passes through Central City south of the city center; it leads northeast 17 miles (27 km) to Beaver Dam and southwest 7 miles (11 km) to Greenville, the Muhlenberg county seat. US 431 passes through Central City's downtown, leading north 35 miles (56 km) to Owensboro and south 36 miles (58 km) to Russellville.

According to the United States Census Bureau, the Central City has a total area of 5.25 square miles (13.6 km^{2}), of which 0.01 square miles (0.03 km^{2}), or 0.21%, are water. Terrain in Central City is rolling hills to steep bluffs along the northern boundaries of the city along the Green River. The city, along its northwestern border, is known for its swamps and lowland area that remain at or near the water table year-round.

Most of Central City has a sandstone bedrock with #9 bituminous coal underlying the bedrock. Central City has a number of old underground coal mine shafts that still crisscross the city. Most of these old shafts date back to the early 1900s. The majority of terrain around the city limits is reclaimed land where surface mining has taken place.

== Demographics ==
Historical population
Census	Pop.	Note	%±
1890	1,144		—
1900	1,348		17.8%
1910	2,545		88.8%
1920	3,108		22.1%
1930	4,321		39.0%
1940	4,199		−2.8%
1950	4,110		−2.1%
1960	3,694		−10.1%
1970	5,450		47.5%
1980	5,214		−4.3%
1990	4,979		−4.5%
2000	5,893		18.4%
2010	5,978		1.4%
2020	5,819		−2.7%
2024 (est.)	5,744		−1.3%
U.S. Decennial Census

=== 2020 census ===
As of the 2020 census, Central City had a population of 5,819. The median age was 39.3 years. 19.0% of residents were under the age of 18 and 16.5% of residents were 65 years of age or older. For every 100 females there were 134.4 males, and for every 100 females age 18 and over there were 138.3 males age 18 and over.

94.8% of residents lived in urban areas, while 5.2% lived in rural areas.

There were 2,034 households in Central City, of which 31.1% had children under the age of 18 living in them. Of all households, 43.3% were married-couple households, 18.2% were households with a male householder and no spouse or partner present, and 30.0% were households with a female householder and no spouse or partner present. About 32.0% of all households were made up of individuals and 15.4% had someone living alone who was 65 years of age or older.

There were 2,231 housing units, of which 8.8% were vacant. The homeowner vacancy rate was 1.6% and the rental vacancy rate was 9.3%.

Racial composition as of the 2020 census
Race	Number	Percent
White	4,900	84.2%
Black or African American	553	9.5%
American Indian and Alaska Native	15	0.3%
Asian	17	0.3%
Native Hawaiian and Other Pacific Islander	1	0.0%
Some other race	91	1.6%
Two or more races	242	4.2%
Hispanic or Latino (of any race)	236	4.1%

=== 2000 census ===
As of the 2000 census, there were 5,893 people, 2,065 households, and 1,410 families residing in the city. The population density was 1,126.2 inhabitants per square mile (434.8/km^{2}). There were 2,313 housing units at an average density of 442.0 per square mile (170.7/km^{2}). The racial makeup of the city was 88.07% White, 10.67% African American, 0.05% Native American, 0.24% Asian, 0.02% Pacific Islander, 0.41% from other races, and 0.54% from two or more races. Hispanic or Latino of any race were 0.80% of the population.

There were 2,065 households, out of which 28.7% had children under the age of 18 living with them, 51.5% were married couples living together, 13.4% had a female householder with no husband present, and 31.7% were non-families. 29.5% of all households were made up of individuals, and 15.5% had someone living alone who was 65 years of age or older. The average household size was 2.39 and the average family size was 2.95.

In the city, the population was spread out, with 20.1% under the age of 18, 10.6% from 18 to 24, 30.8% from 25 to 44, 22.2% from 45 to 64, and 16.3% who were 65 years of age or older. The median age was 38 years. For every 100 females, there were 116.7 males. For every 100 females age 18 and over, there were 120.3 males.

The median income for a household in the city was $27,371, and the median income for a family was $32,959. Males had a median income of $29,284 versus $18,265 for females. The per capita income for the city was $12,637. About 18.4% of families and 20.5% of the population were below the poverty line, including 25.3% of those under age 18 and 21.4% of those age 65 or over.

== Education ==
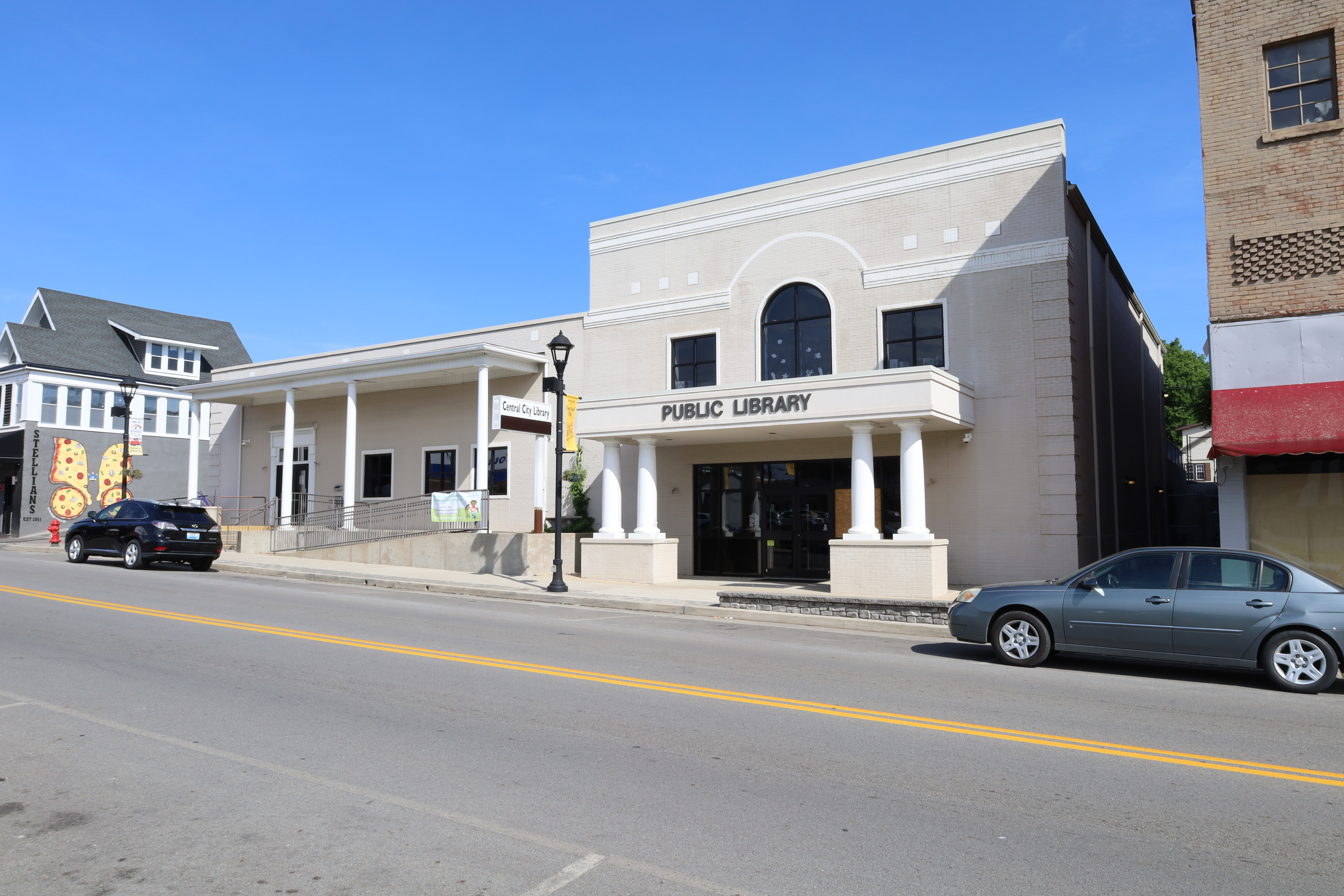
Central City Public Library

Central City is home to Central City Elementary School. Central City Elementary School is a feeder school for Muhlenberg North Middle School which, in turn, feeds Muhlenberg County High School.

Central City is also home to the Muhlenberg Campus of Madisonville Community College, completed in 2001.

Central City has a lending library, a branch of the Muhlenberg County Public Library.

== Media ==
- WMTA AM 1380, founded 1955
- WNES AM, founded in 1955, owned by the Andy Anderson Corporation which founded the station.
- WEKV FM 101.9, 100,000 watt station, owned and operated by Andy Anderson Corporation, licensed to Central City where the main studio is, tower and transmitter located in Pleasant Ridge, (Daviess County), Kentucky.
- A number of regional radio stations have Radio repeater's located in Central City. Two are currently active while a third is under consideration.
- Leader-News, weekly newspaper founded in Greenville Leader, moved to Central City in the 1960s and became the "Greenville Leader-Central City News", owned and published by the Andy Anderson Corporation.
- Times Argus, formerly the Messenger Times Argus, founded in 1909, published weekly.

== Economy ==
Major employers in Central City include:

- Brewco
- Brewer, Inc.
- Green River Correctional Complex
- Kentucky Utilities Green River Generating Station
- Armstrong Coal Company Parkway Mine
- KenAmerican Paradise Underground Mine
- Wal-Mart Supercenter
- Central City Elementary School

== Arts and culture ==
=== Everly Brothers Homecoming/Labor Day Cruise-In ===
On Labor Day Weekend 1988, Central City began hosting The Everly Brothers Homecoming event to raise money for a scholarship fund for Muhlenberg County students. The Homecoming became a popular annual event for fourteen years, before ending in 2002.

Not to be discouraged, the citizens reformed the event as a weekend long cruise-in and car show that is still held annually on Labor Day Weekend.

=== Kentucky Women's Hall of Fame, Inc. ===
Sponsored by the Central City Business & Professional Women's Club, the Hall of Fame is located inside the Central City Public Library, 108 E. Broad Street and features a portrait and memorabilia gallery which includes former Governor Martha Layne Collins, Country & Western music giant Loretta Lynn, and local author, editorialist, historian, war correspondent for the Service Star and noted cultivator of roses Agnes S. Harralson. Central City Library hours are Monday-Wednesday 9 a.m.-5 p.m.; Thursday 9 a.m.-7 p.m.; Friday 9 a.m.-5 p.m.; Saturday 9 a.m.-1 p.m. Visit www.mcplib.org for more info; Central City BPW meets the second Tuesday of each month in the library meeting room at 6:00 pm - visitors are welcome.

=== Muhlenberg County Rail Trail ===
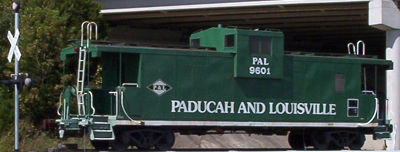
A refurbished railcar from the Paducah and Louisville Railroad along the Muhlenberg County Rail Trail

The Muhlenberg County Rail Trail is a paved trail following an old Paducah and Louisville railway route between Central City and Greenville that is open to pedestrian and non-motorized vehicle traffic. Kentucky's most extensive rail trail conversion to date, the Muhlenberg Rail Trail opened October 20, 2000 and was named "Trail of the Month" by the Rails to Trails Conservancy in May 2004. A viewing platform and birding guide are available where the trail passes through a local wetland. The Muhlenberg County Rails to Trails Committee has obtained an additional 3 miles of abandoned rail, possibly for a later extension into McLean County.

== Notable residents ==
- Tom Christerson, second recipient of an artificial heart
- T. Coleman du Pont, manager for the Central Coal & Iron Company, later president of Dupont and a Republican senator for Delaware
- Don Everly of The Everly Brothers, musician
- Bernard Hickman, former head coach of the Louisville Cardinals men's basketball team
- Halley G. Maddox, US Army major general
- Ziggy Sears, Major League Baseball umpire
- Jim Walker, musician
- Corky Withrow, baseball player
