= Paducah & Louisville Railway =

Railroad between Paducah and Louisville, Kentucky

Coordinates: 37°5′3″N 88°35′41.1″W

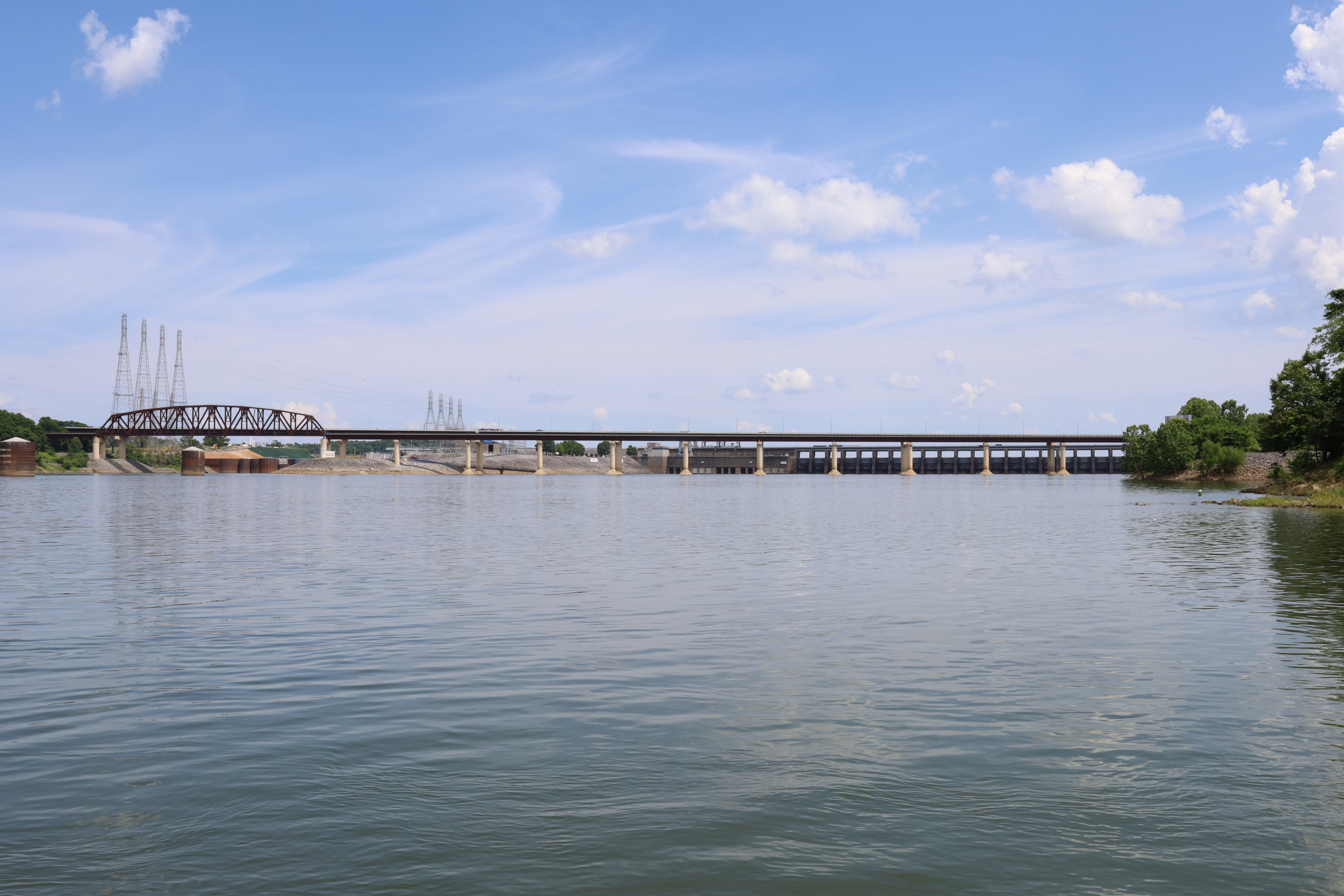
- The rail line crossing the Tennessee River

Overview
- Headquarters: Paducah, Kentucky
- Reporting mark: PAL
- Locale: Kentucky
- Dates of operation: 1986–

Technical
- Track gauge: 4 ft 8 1/2 in (1,435 mm) standard gauge
- Electrification: none

Other
- Website: www.palrr.com

The Paducah & Louisville Railway (reporting mark PAL) is a Class II railroad that operates freight service between Paducah and Louisville, Kentucky. The line is located entirely within the Commonwealth of Kentucky.

The 270-mile (430 km) line was purchased from Illinois Central Gulf Railroad in August, 1986. The 223-mile (359 km) main route runs between Paducah and Louisville with branch lines from Paducah to Kevil and Mayfield, Kentucky and another from Cecilia to Elizabethtown, Kentucky. The PAL interchanges with Burlington Northern Santa Fe (BNSF) and Canadian National (CN), formerly Illinois Central Railroad, in Paducah. In Madisonville, the line interchanges with CSX Transportation (CSXT).

In Louisville, the line interchanges with CSX Transportation (CSXT) and Norfolk Southern (NS). Class III line connections are at Princeton with the Fredonia Valley Railroad (FVRR) and at Louisville with the Louisville and Indiana Railroad (LIRC). The line today carries over 200,000 carloads of traffic on a CTC-controlled mainline with welded rail and even a section of multiple main track nearly 20 miles (32 km) long between Paducah and just east of Calvert City. This is a huge improvement from the little amount of traffic and poor condition the line was in by the time the ICG had sold it.

Today it is a big regional class II railroad connecting with four class I railroads (listed above), as well as the three shortline connections it makes which are also listed above. It has 270 route-miles of track, of which 233 miles (375 km) are its mainline running between its namesake towns of Paducah and Louisville, as well as branch lines to Mayfield, Kevil, and Elizabethtown. The railroad serves "many chemical plants and other manufacturing companies, several coal mines, numerous clay and stone quarries, lumber and propane distributors, farm [including a few large grain elevators] and mine equipment suppliers, warehouses, transloads, bulk terminals, riverports, and one military base."

The parent company of the PAL, P&L Transportation, also operates the Appalachian and Ohio Railroad, Evansville Western Railway and the Midway Southern Railway.

== Current and former equipment ==
Model	Quantity	Acquired	Numbers
EMD GP7u	?		2002 & 8201
EMD GP10	?		1798(UofL), 1978(UK), 8075, 8286, 8302–8303, 8305, 8314–8315, 8317, 8319, 8321–8322, 8333, 8336, 8344 & 8390
EMD GP35	?		635
EMD GP38-2	17		1998(UK), 3800, 3801(UofL), 3803–3812, 3817 & 3831
EMD GP39-2	1		8507
EMD GP40-2	5		2123, 2125, 2127, 2129 & 2131
EMD GP40-3	11		2101, 2103, 2105, 2107, 2109, 2111, 2113, 2115, 2117, 2119 & 2121
EMD RDSLUG/RDMATE (ex-GP35)	11		2100, 2102, 2104, 2106, 2108, 2110, 2112, 2114, 2116, 2118, 2120 & 2122
EMD SD40	?		3053
EMD SD45	?		6683
EMD SD70MAC	9	2013	2012(UK), 2013(UofL), 4503, 4504, 4512, 4516, 4518, 4522(UK), 4523
EMD SW9	?		1236
EMD SW13	?		1302–1303, 1305-1306 & 1308
EMD SW14	?		1425
EMD SD70M	6	2023	4120, 4121, 4122, 4125, 4127, 4128

== See also ==
- Gravel Switch, Livingston County, Kentucky
- List of Kentucky railroads
