= Rail transport company =

Entity that operates a railroad/railway track and/or trains

A rail transport company is a company active within the rail industry. It can be:

- a manufacturing company,
- a railway undertaking providing services through operating rolling stock,
- a railway infrastructure manager.

In some jurisdictions such as the United States, railway companies may combine these roles. Railway companies can be private or public.

== Structure ==
In Europe, the EU requires its members to separate the national railway infrastructure managers from railway undertakings which are public and private companies providing services by operating rolling stock. This ensures conditions enabling the latter companies to compete fairly among each other, with multiple companies bidding for the privilege to operate the line for a limited time period under public service obligation aided by railway subsidies or under franchising. In addition, other companies offer trackside and rolling stock maintenance.

Some countries have in turn a national railway company that owns all track and operates all trains in the country, for instance the Russian Railways (the world's largest rail company by network size). Other countries have many different, sometimes competing, railway companies that operate each their own lines, particularly in the United States and Canada. Countries may have both public and private railway companies, for instance the United States, where the publicly-owned Amtrak exists alongside numerous private operators.

== See also ==
- Railway undertaking
- Railway infrastructure manager
- List of railway companies
- List of countries by rail transport network size
- Rail transport by country
