= Chetoogeta Mountain Tunnel =

Tunnel for a railroad in Georgia, US

Coordinates: 34.838689°N 85.033281°W

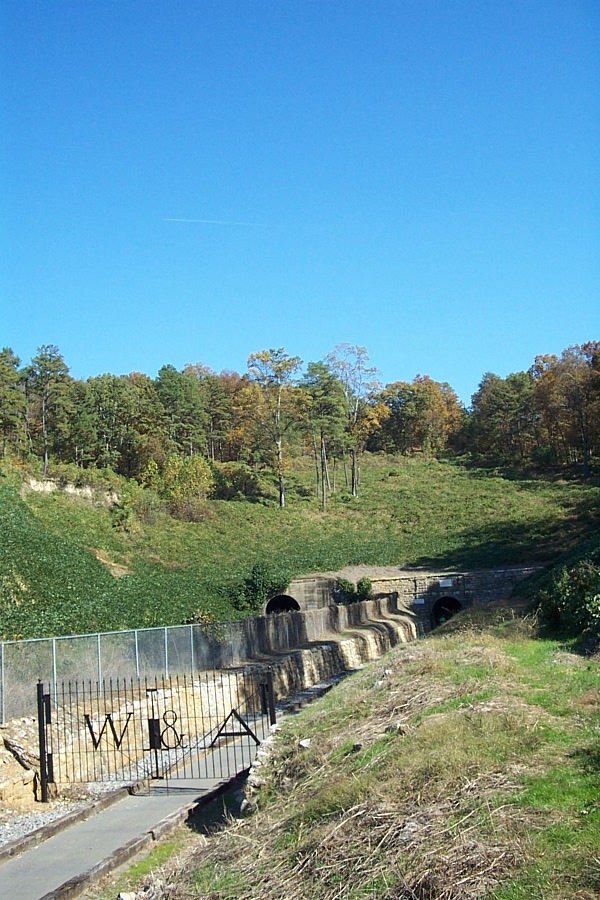
The northwest faces of the historic Western and Atlantic Railroad Tunnel (right) and modern CSX (left) railroad tunnels

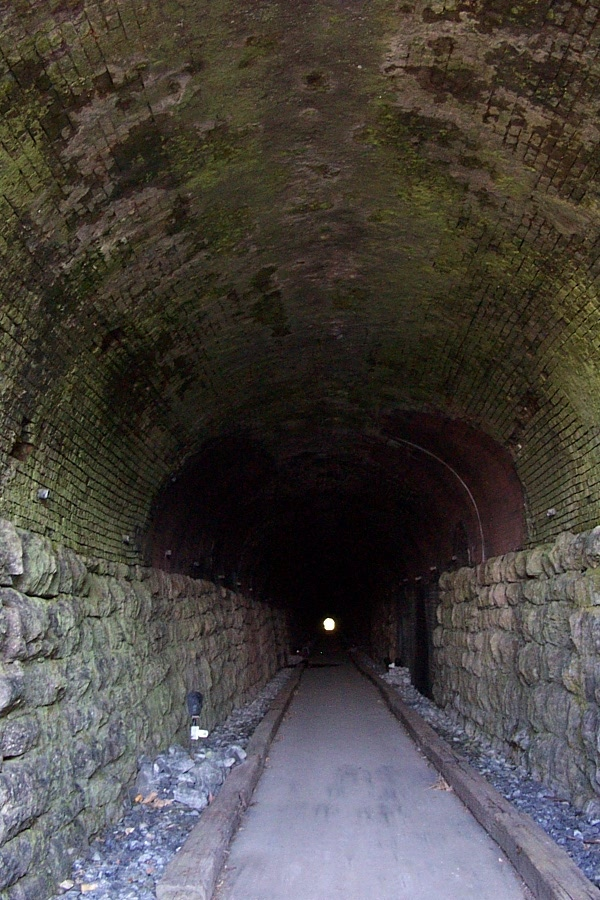
Brick-lined interior of the W&A tunnel, now preserved as a walking trail, looking southeast

The Chetoogeta Mountain Tunnel () refers to two different railroad tunnels passing through Chetoogeta Mountain in Tunnel Hill, Georgia, United States.

The first tunnel, known as the Western and Atlantic Railroad Tunnel at Tunnel Hill, was completed on May 7, 1850, as part of the construction of the Western & Atlantic Railroad (W & A), the first state road in Georgia. It was the first major railroad tunnel in the South and is 1,447 feet/0.274 miles; 441 meters in length. It was renovated in 1998-2000 and is now open to the public as a privately owned historic site. It was listed on the National Register of Historic Places in 2002.

The second tunnel was built from 1926 to 1928 and is 1,557 feet/0.295 miles; 475 meters long. It is still in use by CSX Transportation, under lease from the Georgia Department of Transportation. It, like the entire W & A subdivision, is a major route between Atlanta and Chattanooga.

The nearby town of Tunnel Hill, Georgia (originally Tunnelsville) was created and named for the first tunnel, and was the supply base for its construction materials and worker housing.

Two historic events occurred here during the American Civil War; first the Great Locomotive Chase and second a battle between Union and Confederate forces during the Atlanta campaign. The first occurred on April 12, 1862, when a civilian scout, James J. Andrews, led 22 volunteer Union soldiers from three Ohio regiments: the 2nd, 21st, and 33rd Ohio Infantry. Also named Andrews' Raid, the near suicide mission went deep into Confederate territory, where the men stole the locomotive named the General. The men were pursued by another train, the Texas, and Confederate forces. Andrews and company made it north of this location before they ran out of water and steam to run the locomotive, where they abandoned the train. Many of the men, including Andrews, were hanged in Atlanta.

The second incident was a minor skirmish on May 6 and 7, 1864 between invading Union and Confederate forces. Union forces were generally invading and securing the rail lines as they progressed towards Atlanta. Confederate pickets were posted to delay advancing troops.

== See also ==
- National Register of Historic Places listings in Whitfield County, Georgia
