= The General (1926 film) =

1926 silent film

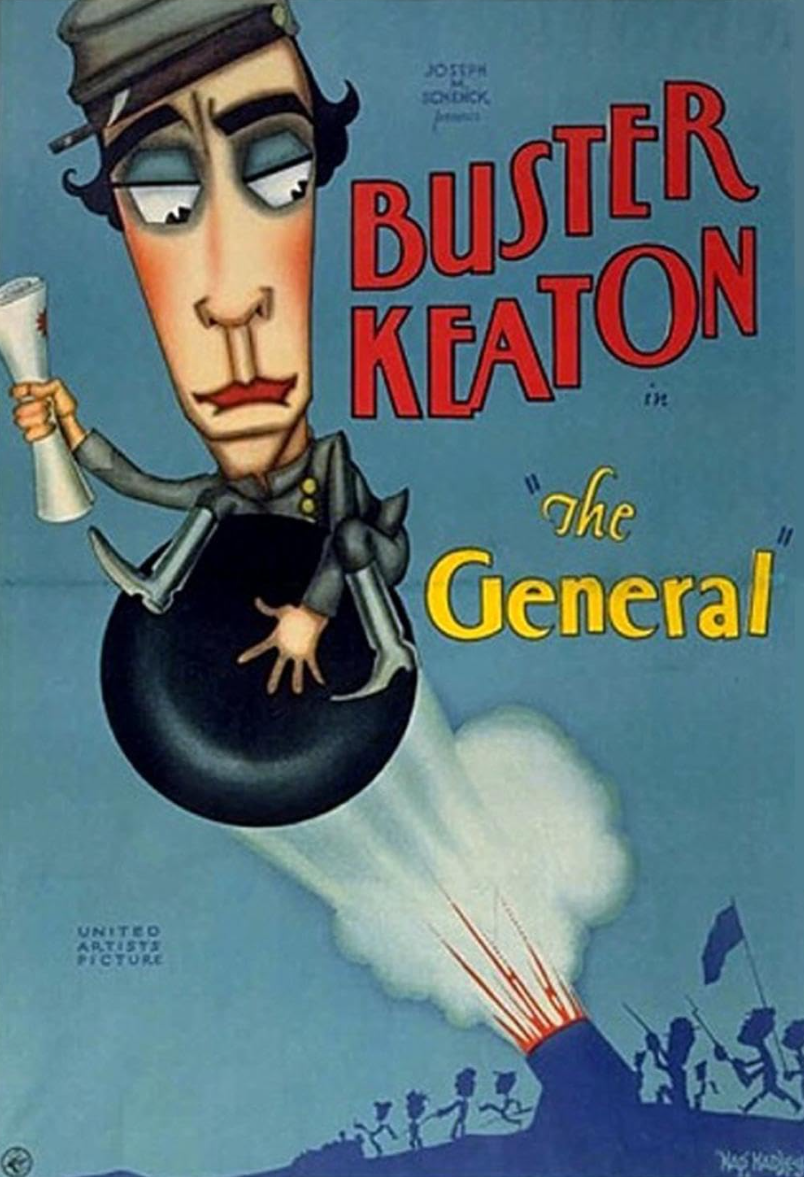
- Theatrical release poster
- Directed by: Buster Keaton; Clyde Bruckman
- Screenplay by: Al Boasberg; Clyde Bruckman; Buster Keaton; Charles Smith
- Based on: The Great Locomotive Chase; 1863 memoir Union soldier by William Pittenger
- Produced by: Joseph Schenck; Buster Keaton
- Starring: Buster Keaton; Marion Mack
- Cinematography: Devereaux Jennings; Bert Haines
- Edited by: Buster Keaton; Sherman Kell
- Music by: William P. Perry (1970) (Note: Carl Davis (1987), Robert Israel (1995), Baudime Jam (1999), Joe Hisaishi (2004), Timothy Brock (2005) and Angelin Fonda (2017) later acted as music supervisors on various restorations of this film.)
- Production companies: Buster Keaton Productions; Joseph M. Schenck Productions
- Distributed by: United Artists
- Release dates: December 31, 1926 (Tokyo); February 5, 1927 (New York City)
- Running time: 79 minutes (8 reels) (times vary with different versions)
- Country: United States
- Languages: Silent film English intertitles
- Budget: $750,000
- Box office: $1 million

The General is a 1926 American silent comedy film released by United Artists. It was inspired by the Great Locomotive Chase, a true story of an event that occurred during the American Civil War. The story was adapted from the 1889 memoir The Great Locomotive Chase by William Pittenger. The film stars Buster Keaton, who also co-directed it along with Clyde Bruckman.

At the time of its initial release, The General, made toward the end of the silent era, was not well received by critics and audiences, resulting in mediocre box office returns (about half a million dollars domestically, and approximately one million worldwide). Because of its huge budget ($750,000, supplied by Metro chief Joseph M. Schenck) and failure to turn a significant profit, Keaton lost his independence as a film maker and was forced into a restrictive deal with Metro-Goldwyn-Mayer.

In 1954, the film entered the public domain in the United States because its claimant did not renew its copyright registration in the 28th year after publication. Over time, The General has come to be regarded by critics and filmmakers as one of the greatest films ever made. In 1989, the film was selected by the Library of Congress to be included in the first class of films for preservation in the United States National Film Registry for being "culturally, historically, or aesthetically significant."

== Plot ==
Full film: The General (1926)

After arriving in Marietta, Georgia, Western & Atlantic Railroad train engineer Johnnie Gray visits Annabelle Lee, one of the two loves of his life, the other being his locomotive, The General. News arrives that the American Civil War has broken out, and Annabelle's brother and father rush to enlist in the Confederate Army. To please Annabelle, Johnnie hurries to be first in line to enlist, but is rejected because he is more valuable as an engineer, although he is not told that reason. On leaving, he runs into Annabelle's father and brother, who beckon to him to join them in line, but he walks away, leading them to believe that he does not want to enlist. Annabelle decides that she will not speak to Johnnie again until he is in uniform.

A year passes, and Annabelle receives word that her father has been wounded. She travels north on the W&ARR to see him, with The General pulling the train. When it makes a stop, the passengers and crew detrain for a quick meal. As previously planned, Union Army spies led by Captain Anderson use the opportunity to steal the train. Anderson's objective is to burn all the railroad bridges he passes, thus preventing reinforcement and resupply of the Confederate army. Annabelle, having returned to the train to fetch her belongings, is taken captive by the spies.

Johnnie gives chase, first on foot, then by handcar and boneshaker bicycle, before reaching the station at Kingston. He alerts the army detachment there, which boards another train to give chase, with Johnnie manning the locomotive the Texas. However, the flatcars are not hooked up to the engine and the troops are left behind. By the time Johnnie realizes he is alone, it is too late to turn back.

The Union agents try various methods to shake their pursuer, including disconnecting their trailing car and dropping railroad ties on the tracks. As the chase continues northward, the Confederate Army of Tennessee is ordered to retreat and the Northern army advances in its wake. Now behind Union lines, the hijackers see that Johnnie is by himself. Johnnie stops the Texas and runs into the forest to hide.

At nightfall, Johnnie climbs through the window of a house to steal food, but hides underneath a table when Union officers enter. He overhears their plan for a surprise attack and learns that the Rock River Bridge is essential for their supply trains. There, Johnny meets Annabelle, and they decide to steal back the train.

As day breaks, Johnnie and Annabelle find themselves near a railway station where Union soldiers and equipment are being organized for the attack. Seeing The General, Johnnie devises a plan to warn the South. After sneaking Annabelle onto a boxcar, Johnnie steals his engine back. Two Union trains, including the Texas, set out after the pair, while the Union attack is launched. Fending off his pursuers, Johnnie starts a fire behind The General in the center of the Rock River Bridge to cut off the Union's supply line.

Reaching friendly lines, Johnnie warns the Confederate commander of the impending attack and their forces rush to meet the enemy. Meanwhile, Annabelle is reunited with her convalescing father. The pursuing Texas drives onto the burning bridge, which collapses. When Union soldiers try to ford the river, Confederate fire drives them back.

Afterward, Johnnie returns to his locomotive to find the Union officer whom he had knocked out in escaping earlier has now regained consciousness. He takes the officer prisoner and is spotted by the Confederate general. As a reward for his bravery, he is commissioned a lieutenant and given the captured officer's sword.

Returning to The General with Annabelle, he tries to kiss her, but has to repeatedly return the salutes of troops walking past. Johnnie finally uses his left hand to embrace Annabelle while using his right to salute passing soldiers.

== Cast ==
- Buster Keaton as Johnnie Gray
- Marion Mack as Annabelle Lee
- Glen Cavender as Union Captain Anderson
- Jim Farley as General Thatcher
- Frederick Vroom as a Confederate general
- Charles Smith as Annabelle's father
- Frank Barnes as Annabelle's brother
- Joe Keaton as a Union general
- Mike Donlin as a Union general
- Tom Nawn as a Union general

== Production ==
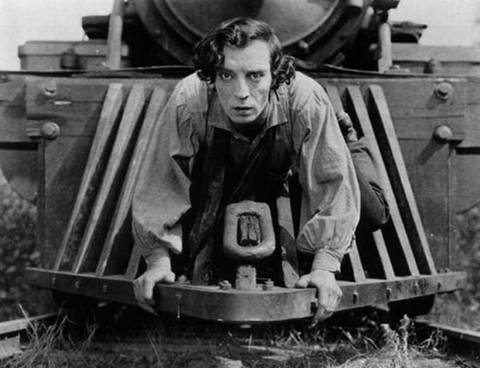
Keaton riding the cowcatcher.

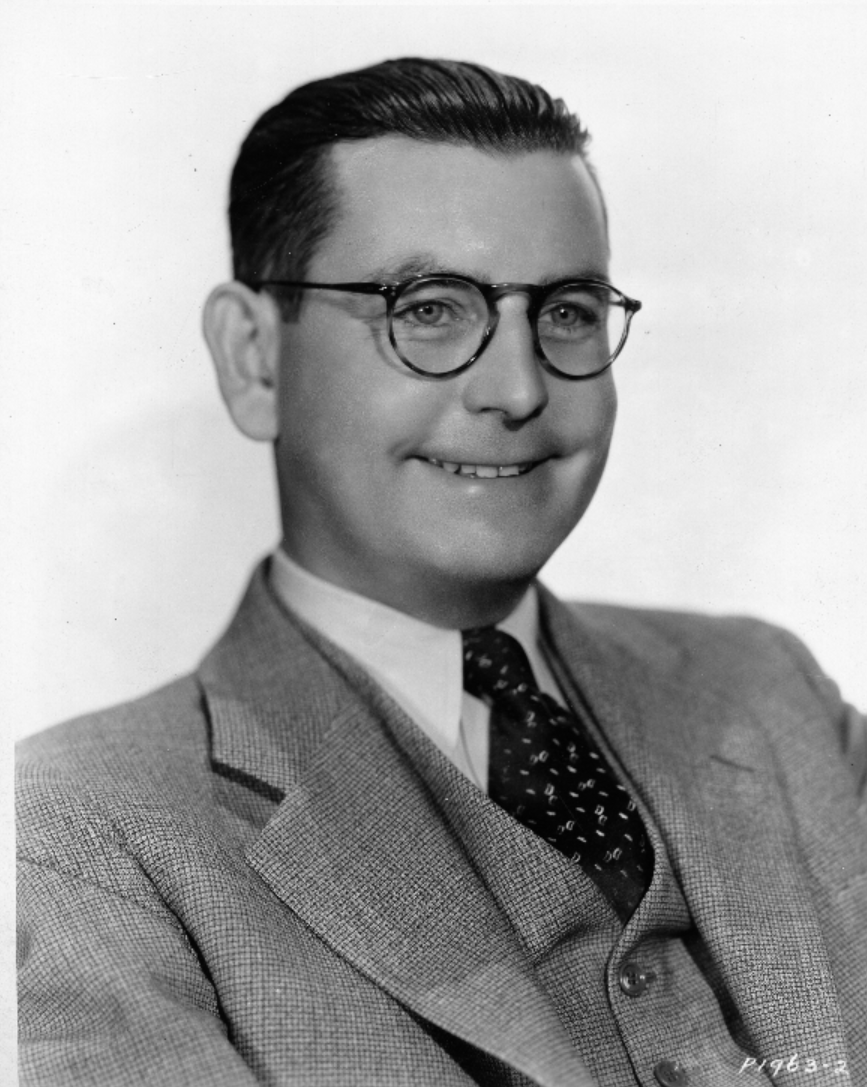
The General was co-directed by Clyde Bruckman (pictured), who was a friend and collaborator of Keaton.

In early 1926, Keaton's collaborator Clyde Bruckman told him about William Pittenger's 1889 memoir The Great Locomotive Chase about the 1862 Great Locomotive Chase. Keaton was a huge fan of trains and had read the book. Although it was written from the Union Army perspective, Keaton did not believe that the audience would accept Confederates as villains and changed the story's point of view. Keaton looked into shooting the film in the area where the original events took place, and attempted to authorize a lease agreement for the real-life General. At that time, the locomotive was on display at Chattanooga Union Station. The Nashville, Chattanooga and St. Louis Railway denied Keaton's request when they realized the film was going to be a comedy.

In April 1926, Keaton's location manager, Burt Jackson, found an area in Oregon with old-fashioned railroads which he ascertained to be more authentic in terms of period setting for the film. He also discovered that the Oregon, Pacific and Eastern Railway owned two vintage locomotives operating in lumber service that looked the part and purchased them for the production. He later bought a third locomotive in Oregon to portray the Texas for the purpose of using it in the iconic bridge collapse stunt. Producer Joseph M. Schenck was excited about the film and gave Keaton a budget of $400,000. Keaton spent weeks working on the script and preparing for elaborate pyrotechnics shots. He also grew his hair long for the film. He hired Sennett Bathing Beauties actress Marion Mack for the female lead role.

The cast and crew arrived in Cottage Grove, Oregon, on May 27, 1926, with 18 freight cars full of Civil War-era cannons, rebuilt passenger cars, stagecoaches, houses, wagons and laborers. The crew stayed at the Bartell Hotel in nearby Eugene, and brought three 35 mm cameras with them from Los Angeles. On May 31, set construction began, and regular train service in Cottage Grove ceased until the end of production. One third of the film's budget was spent in Cottage Grove, and 1,500 locals were hired.

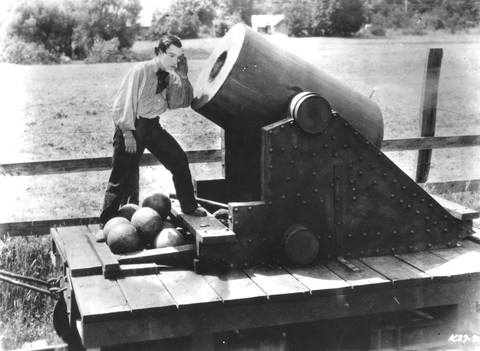
Keaton brought 18 freight cars of props and set materials to Oregon.

Filming began on June 8. At first, Keaton completely ignored Mack on set. She said that "Buster just stuck to the job and to his little clique, and that was all" and that the crew "stopped the train when they saw a place to play baseball." Keaton eventually came to like Mack, often playing practical jokes on her. The atmosphere on set was lighthearted, and every Sunday the cast and crew played baseball with local residents, who often said that Keaton could have been a professional player.

According to a United Artists press release at the time, the film had 3,000 people on its payroll and cost $400 an hour to make. Entertainment trade papers reported rumors that the film's budget had grown to between $500,000 and $1 million, and that Keaton was out of control, building real bridges and having dams constructed to change the depths of rivers. Producer Schenck was angry at Keaton over the growing costs. There were also numerous on-set accidents that contributed to the growing budget. This included Keaton being knocked unconscious, an assistant director being shot in the face with a blank cartridge, a train wheel running over a brakeman's foot—resulting in a $2,900 lawsuit—and the train's wood-burning engine causing numerous fires. The fires often spread to forests and farmers' haystacks, which cost the production $25 per burnt stack.

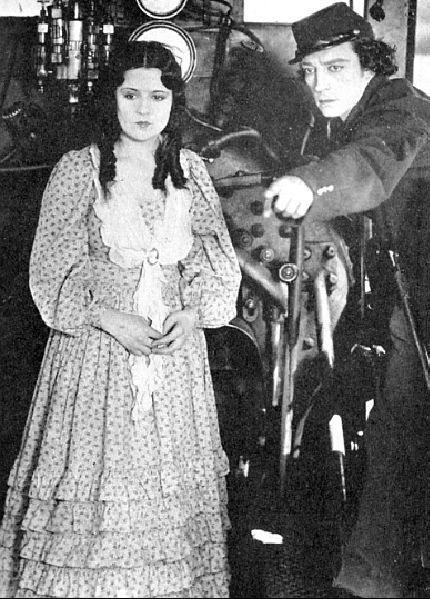
Keaton with Mack

On July 23, Keaton shot the climactic train wreck scene in the conifer forest near Cottage Grove. The town declared a local holiday so that everyone could watch the spectacle. Between three and four thousand local residents showed up, including 500 extras from the Oregon National Guard. (Elsewhere in the film, the Oregon National Guard members appear dressed as both Union and Confederate soldiers who cross the landscape in the background of the train tracks). Keaton used six cameras for the train wreck scene, which began four hours late and required several lengthy trial runs. The production company left the wreckage in the riverbed. The locomotive became a minor tourist attraction for nearly twenty years, until it was salvaged in 1944–45 for scrap during World War II.

Another fire broke out during the filming of a large fight scene, which not only cost the production $50,000, but also forced Keaton and the crew to return to Los Angeles on August 6 due to excessive smoke. Heavy rains finally cleared the smoke in late August and production resumed. Shooting concluded on September 18. Keaton had shot 200,000 feet of film and began a lengthy editing process for a late December release date.

Keaton performed many dangerous physical stunts on and around the moving train, including jumping from the engine to a tender to a boxcar, and running along the roofs of the railcars. One of the riskier stunts involved him pulling a railroad tie out from being lodged into the track, with the train steadily approaching, then sitting on the cow-catcher of the slow-moving train while carrying the tie, then tossing it at another tie to dislodge it from the tracks.

Another dangerous stunt involved Keaton sitting on one of the coupling rods connecting the drivers of the locomotive. Had the locomotive suffered a wheelspin, Keaton might have been thrown from the rod and injured or killed. Shot in one take, the scene shows the train starting gently and gradually picking up speed as it enters a shed, to which Keaton's character Johnnie Gray, distracted and heartbroken, is oblivious.

== Release and initial reception ==
The General premiered on December 31, 1926, in two small theaters in Tokyo, Japan. It was scheduled to have its US premiere at the prestigious Capitol Theatre in New York City on January 22, 1927, but was delayed for several weeks due to the enormous hit, Flesh and the Devil, then playing at the Capitol. It finally premiered on February 5, with the engine bell from the real General train on display in the lobby to promote it. It played at the Capitol for one week, making $50,992, considered average box-office. With a final budget of $750,000, it made $474,264 in the US.

On its initial release, the film largely failed to please the critics. Variety reported of a theater in which it played, "After four weeks of record business with Flesh and the Devil, [the theater] looks as though it were virtually going to starve to death this week." It went on to say The General was "far from funny" and that it was "a flop." The New York Times reviewer, Mordaunt Hall, stated: "The production itself is singularly well mounted, but the fun is not exactly plentiful," and "This is by no means so good as Mr. Keaton's previous efforts." The Los Angeles Times reported that the picture was "neither straight comedy nor is it altogether thrilling drama"..."drags terribly with a long and tiresome chase of one engine by another." A review in Motion Picture Classic called it "a mild Civil War comedy, not up to Keaton's best standards." A review in the New York Herald Tribune called it "long and tedious — the least-funny thing Buster Keaton has ever done." Writer Robert E. Sherwood wrote, "Someone should have told Buster Keaton that it is difficult to derive laughter from the sight of men being killed in battle." There was a favourable review in the Brooklyn Eagle.

== Legacy ==
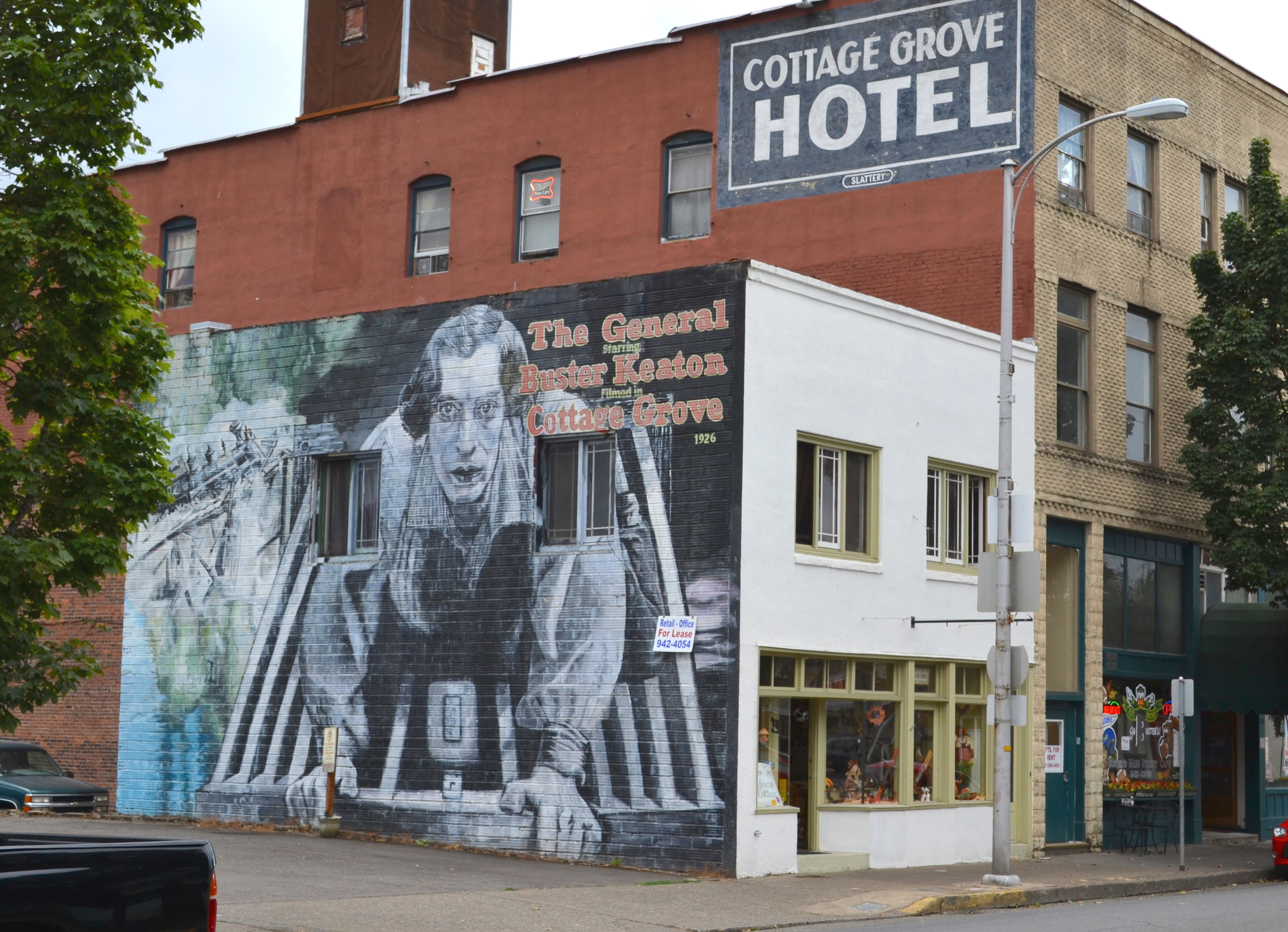
A mural commemorating the film in Cottage Grove, Oregon, where much of it was filmed in the summer of 1926

In 1963, Keaton said, "I was more proud of that picture than any I ever made. Because I took an actual happening out of the...history books, and I told the story in detail too." Following changes in taste and critical reevaluation of Keaton's work, later audiences and critics have come to agree with him, and The General is now considered a major classic of the silent era. David Robinson wrote, "Every shot has the authenticity and the unassumingly correct composition of a Mathew Brady Civil War photograph." Raymond Durgnat wrote, "Perhaps The General is the most beautiful [film], with its spare, grey photography, its eye for the racy, lunging lines of the great locomotives, with their prow-like cowcatchers, with its beautifully sustained movement." In 2015, film critic Eileen Jones (writing for leftist magazine Jacobin) called the film a "comic masterpiece" while also criticizing how it exemplified a larger tendency throughout American cinema to champion the Lost Cause of the Confederacy.

In 1954 the film entered the public domain in the United States because its claimant did not renew its copyright registration in the 28th year after publication.

American filmmaker Orson Welles said that it was "the greatest comedy ever made, the greatest Civil War film ever made, and perhaps the greatest film ever made." He featured the film in his 1971 documentary television series, The Silent Years.

In 1989, The General was in the first group of films chosen by the Library of Congress's National Film Registry as "culturally, historically, or aesthetically significant," alongside films such as: The Best Years of Our Lives, Casablanca, Citizen Kane, Gone with the Wind, Singin' in the Rain, Snow White and the Seven Dwarfs, Star Wars, Sunset Boulevard, and The Wizard of Oz.

In the decennial Sight and Sound poll of the greatest films ever made, international critics ranked The General eighth in 1972 and tenth in 1982. In the 2012 poll, it was ranked 34th by the critics and 75th by the directors. In 2002, critic Roger Ebert ranked it sixth in the 2002 Sight and Sound Greatest Films poll and included it on his Great Movies list. Dave Whitaker of DavesMovieDatabase, a film aggregator site that combines other lists with box-office, ratings and awards, lists The General as the 99th-greatest movie of all time, the 21st-greatest comedy, and the 3rd-greatest silent.

A mural was painted on a building in Cottage Grove, Oregon, commemorating the film. David Thomson has speculated it is "the only memorial in the United States to Buster Keaton."

U.S. film distributor Kino International released the film on Blu-ray in November 2009, the first American release of a silent feature film for the high-definition video medium. The Blu-ray edition replicates the extra features of Kino's 2008 "The Ultimate 2-Disc Edition" on DVD, including the choice of three orchestral scores.

The film was recognized by American Film Institute in the lists AFI's 100 Years...100 Laughs (2000) and AFI's 100 Years...100 Movies (10th Anniversary Edition) (2007), both in 18th spot.

== Versions ==
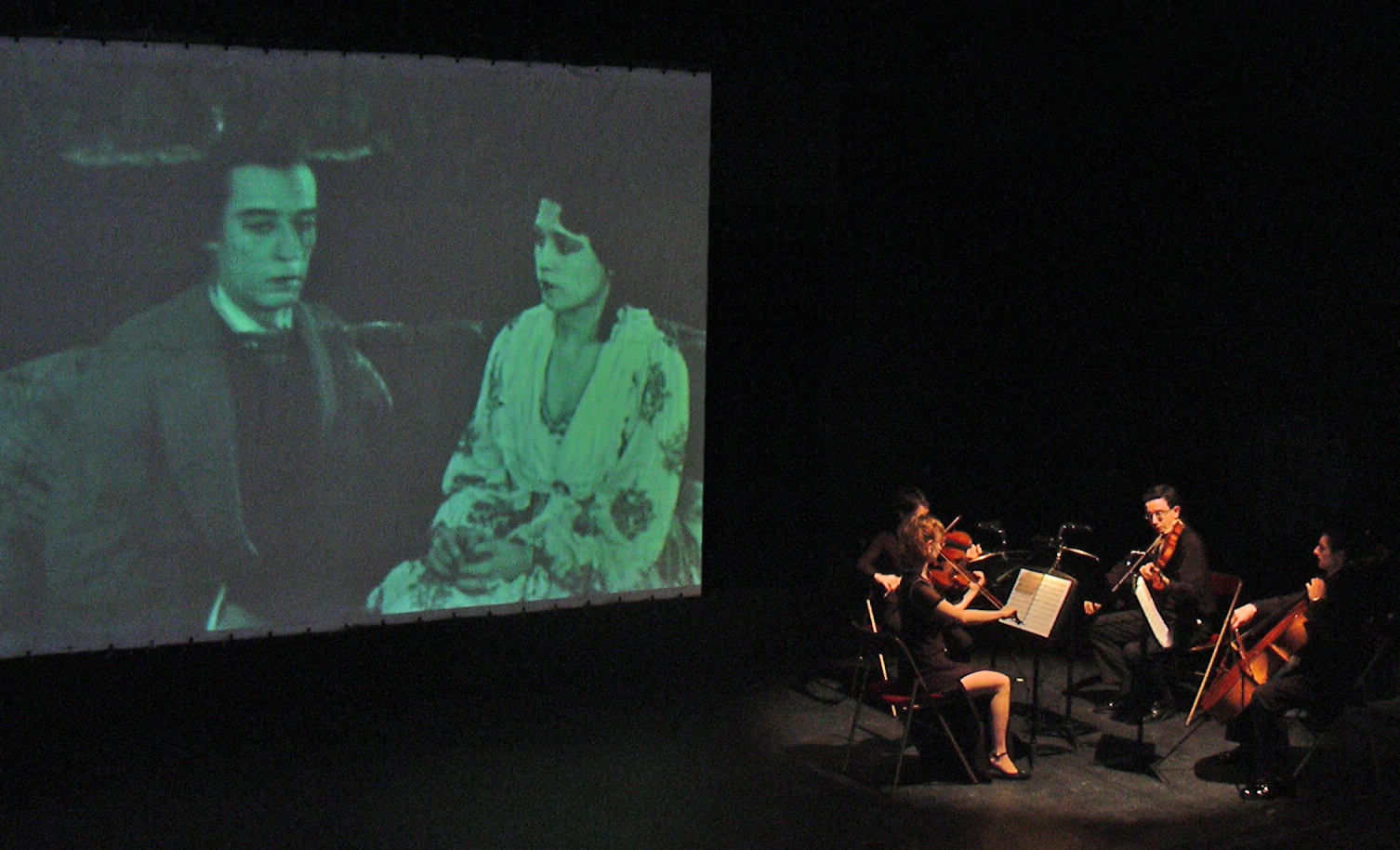
A 2006 screening with live music. Since its initial failure, the film has become regarded as a classic and one of Keaton's best.

In 1953, a new version of the film was created by film distributor and collector Raymond Rohauer, re-edited with an introduction and music. That version is still under copyright, because Rohauer filed a copyright registration in 1953 and renewed it in 1983.

In 1987, a then-51-year-old Carl Davis composed a score for the film, which was later used with a 4K restoration of the film in 2019. Davis died on August 3, 2023.

In 2004, Japanese composer Joe Hisaishi created a score which accompanied a new digital restoration of the film. The restoration was unveiled at the 57th Cannes Film Festival, with the score played live, conducted by Hisaishi, making him the first Japanese musician to conduct an orchestra at a Cannes Film Festival.

In 2016, an original score was commissioned to celebrate the 90th anniversaries of both The General and the Hollywood Theatre in Portland, Oregon. The film subsequently toured Oregon.

In 2017, the Dallas Chamber Symphony commissioned an original film score for The General from composer Douglas Pipes. The score premiered during a concert screening on October 17, 2017, at Moody Performance Hall with Richard McKay conducting.

== See also ==
- Buster Keaton filmography
- List of films and television shows about the American Civil War
- The Great Locomotive Chase

== Bibliography ==
- Meade, Marion (1997). Buster Keaton: Cut to the Chase. New York, New York: Da Capo Press. ISBN 0306808021.
- The General essay by Daniel Eagan in America's Film Legacy: The Authoritative Guide to the Landmark Movies in the National Film Registry, A&C Black, 2010 ISBN 0826429777, pages 124-126.
