= Atlanta Cyclorama & Civil War Museum =

Former museum

- Cyclorama of the Battle of Atlanta
- U.S. National Register of Historic Places
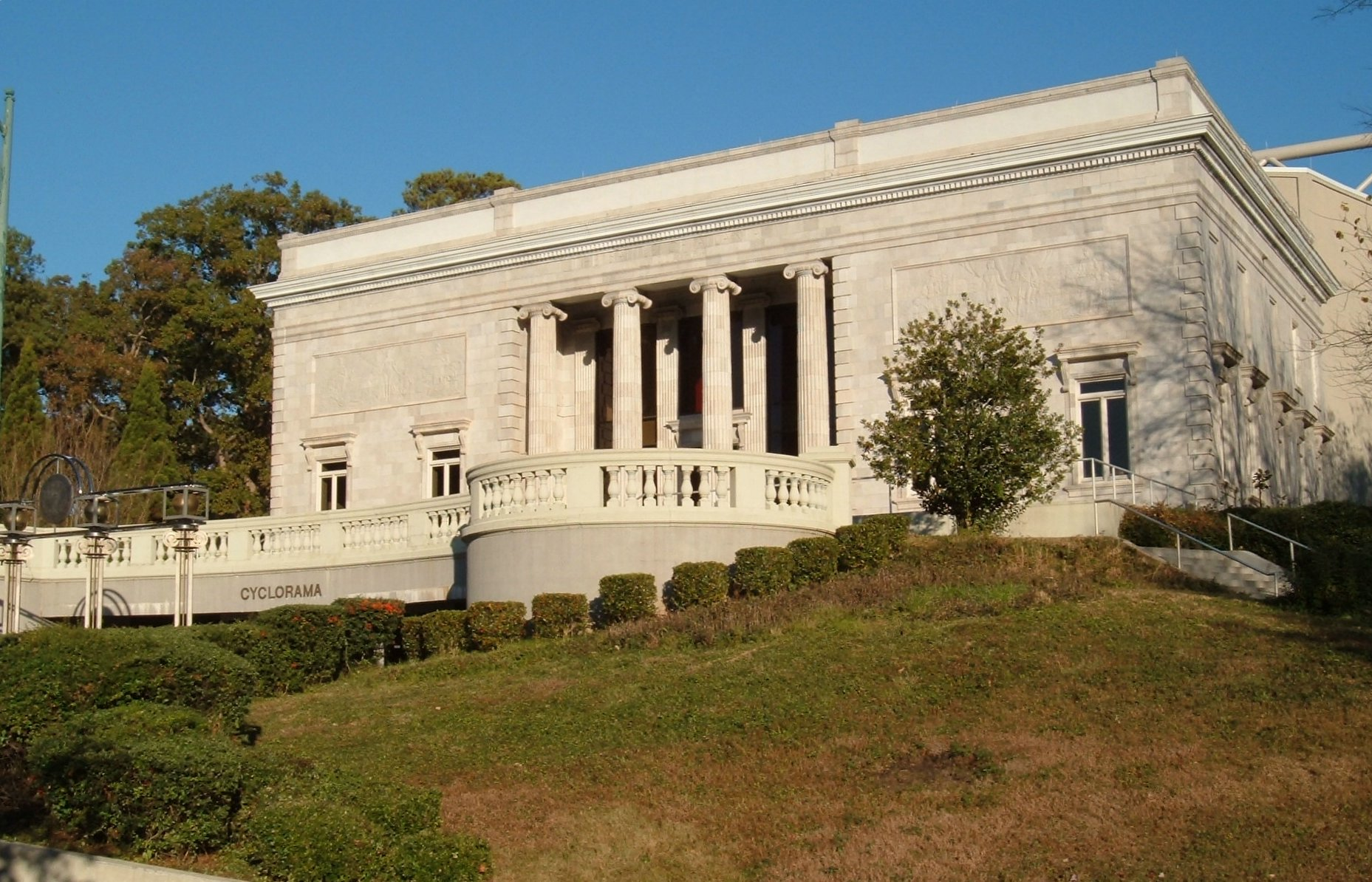
- Atlanta former Cyclorama building

- Location within Atlanta Location within Georgia Location within the United States
- Location: Atlanta, Georgia
- Coordinates: 33°44′2.97″N 84°22′15.83″W
- Built: 1885
- Architect: American Cyclorama Co.; John Francis Downing
- Visitation: 54,489 (2014)
- NRHP reference No.: 71000274
- Added to NRHP: December 9, 1971

The Atlanta Cyclorama and Civil War Museum was a Civil War museum located in Atlanta, Georgia. Its most noted attraction was the Atlanta Cyclorama, a cylindrical panoramic painting of the Battle of Atlanta. As of December 2021, the Cyclorama is located at the Atlanta History Center, while the building is now Zoo Atlanta's Savanna Hall.

== History ==
The painting was created as a traveling attraction for Northerners; it portrayed celebrated Union officers, while the portrayals of Confederate officers were not individualized. It was purchased and moved to Atlanta in 1891 by Paul Atkinson, who attempted to recast the Battle of Atlanta as a Confederate victory, repainting a group of Confederate prisoners of war so they became defeated Union soldiers.

Paying visitors viewed the cylindrical painting from the inside, entering through an entrance in the floor. After being seated, the central cylinder rotates slowly, affording a view of the entire painting. The painting at one time was the largest oil painting in the world, and if unrolled would measure 49 feet (15 m) high by 358 feet (109 m) long, weighing 10,000 pounds. It held this record until 1894, when it was surpassed in size by the Racławice Panorama (15 by 114 meters (49 ft × 374 ft) a cycloramic painting depicting the Battle of Racławice.

The Cyclorama was narrated at one time by volunteers, some of whom were veterans or widows of veterans of the Civil War. In 1960, Atlanta Mayor William B. Hartsfield accepted the donation of a recorded narration written by Junius Andrew Park Jr., in honor of his father, Junius Andrew Park Sr., who was born and raised in Atlanta. Research was done by Lurline Richardson Park, the writer's wife. The narration was musically scored by Atlanta musician Sam T. Wilhoit, and the narration was read by Hollywood actor Victor Jory, who appeared in the original motion picture Gone with the Wind. All parties donated their time and labor. In later years, a revised narration was produced and narrated by actor Shepperd Strudwick.

== Civil War museum ==
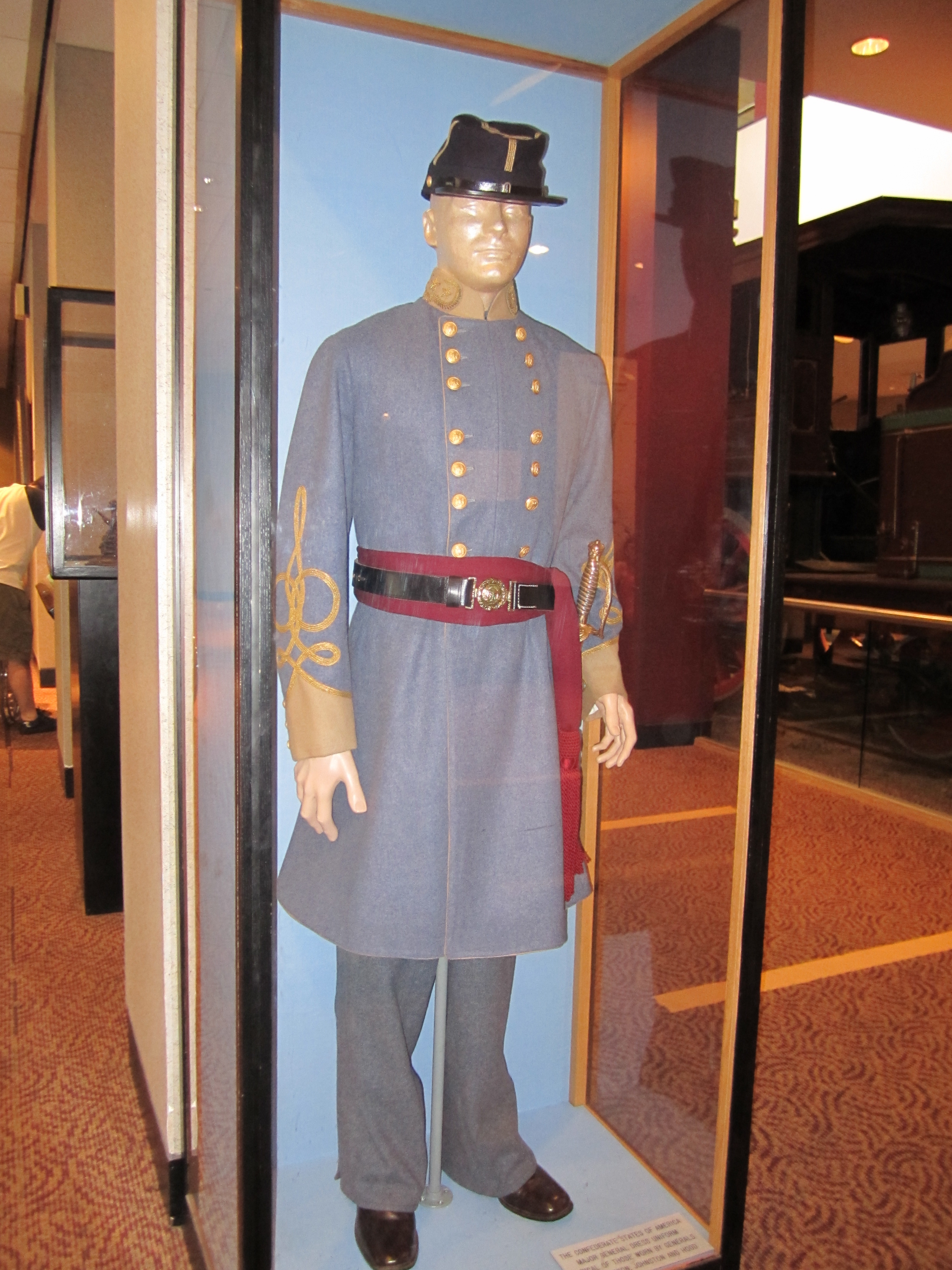
The uniform of a Confederate general

The museum displayed pictures and artifacts from the Civil War, including the Texas, a steam locomotive that pursued the captured train the General in the Great Locomotive Chase during the war. This raid was depicted in the 1927 Buster Keaton film The General and the 1956 Disney film The Great Locomotive Chase.

A movie theater inside the museum showed a short film about the Atlanta campaign to visitors before they viewed the painting. The 14-minute film was called The Atlanta Campaign, and was directed by and narrated by James Earl Jones. It originally premiered on May 9, 1990, and had a budget of $300,000, including a 24-foot scale model of Atlanta and a cast of 5,000 reenactors. Many of the reenactors also appeared in the 1989 film, Glory.

The Cyclorama painting itself is augmented by a three-dimensional diorama in front of the painting and a narration of the events of the battle and the history of the painting. A popular story concerning the diorama involves actor Clark Gable. During the celebrations surrounding the opening of the film Gone with the Wind, the film's actors visited the Atlanta Cyclorama. Gable allegedly claimed that the only way the painting could be any more magnificent was if he were in it, prompting the management to add Gable's features to one of the sculptures in the diorama, that of a dying soldier.

== Relocation ==
In July 2014, Atlanta city officials announced plans to relocate the Cyclorama to the Atlanta History Center in Buckhead. The possibility of a move started soon after the 2008 restoration of the only other panoramic painting in the United States, the Gettysburg Cyclorama. In 2011, a panel of city leaders and historians was appointed to investigate options for restoring and possibly relocating the painting, which was estimated to cost at least $8 million to restore. Three options were considered: relocate to the Centennial Olympic Park area, near the Georgia Aquarium and other new tourist attractions; relocate to the Atlanta History Center; or, remain in the current location. The Atlanta History Center was selected after a local couple offered $10 million towards the project, with the History Center noting in its announcement that it had already raised $32.2 million for the move. Including the $10 million endowment, ultimately a total of $35.78 million was raised.

The Cyclorama's final day open to the public was June 30, 2015, after which it closed in preparation for the move. The History Center began construction in fall 2015 on a new 23,000-square-foot (2,100 m^{2}) building to house the painting, the diorama and the Texas locomotive. During the construction, restoration work was done on the painting, including the addition of areas of the painting that were removed prior to its installation in the current Grant Park facility. After the History Center building was completed, the painting and diorama were to be moved to the new facility where restoration continued, at times in view of History Center visitors. The building in Grant Park was given to Zoo Atlanta, which planned to use it as office and event space, including a new private viewing area for a proposed expansion of the zoo's African elephant habitat.

The restored Cyclorama reopened in February 2019.

== See also ==
- Gettysburg Cyclorama
- International Panorama Council
