= John Sharpe Rowland =

Major John Sharpe Rowland (August 6, 1795 – September 18, 1863) was a wealthy planter and politician in antebellum South Carolina and Georgia. During the American Civil War he served as Superintendent of the Western and Atlantic Railroad.

== Early life and military service ==
Major Rowland was born in Rutherfordton, North Carolina, to Thomas and Mildred Lewis Rowland. His father served in the Revolutionary War. In 1810 his family moved to Greenville, South Carolina, and at age 17 John Sharpe Rowland "began teaching an English school with the permission of his parents." He volunteered during the War of 1812 and served in Captain William Turner's Company under Lieutenant Colonel John Ashe Alston's 3rd Regiment, South Carolina Militia. There he served with rank as private, adjutant, and mustered out as a corporal. After the war at age 19 he was appointed Collector of the Direct Tax of Pendleton District, South Carolina. He then returned to his birthplace of Rutherdford Court House, North Carolina for a short time where he served as Assistant Court Clerk to his uncle, Col. Richard Lewis where he remained until his marriage.

== Pre-civil war politics ==
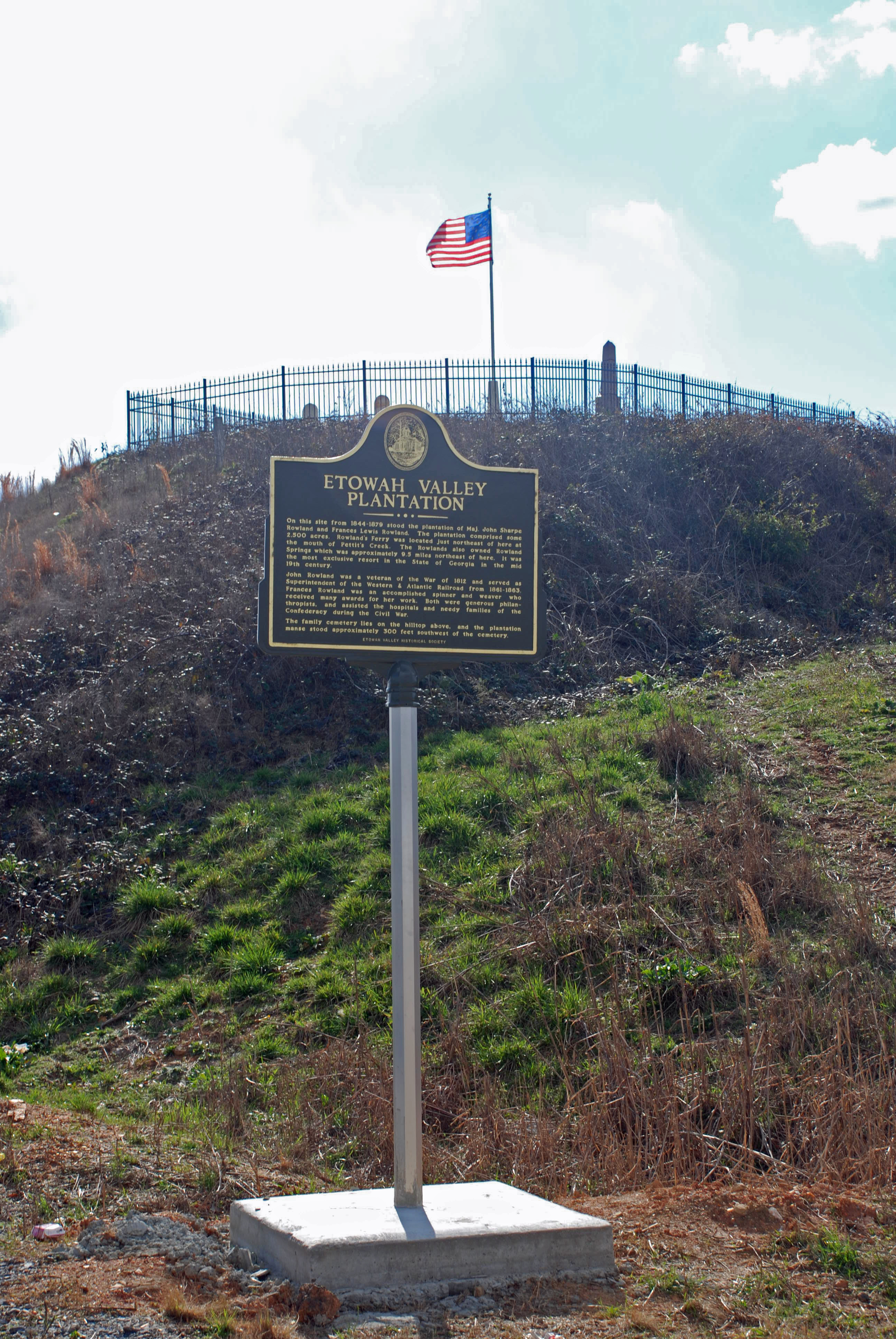
Etowah Valley Plantation historical marker

On November 21, 1816, he married Miss Frances Machen Lewis of Spartanburg District, S.C. They had eleven children, four of whom died in infancy. In 1832, he was a member of the Committee of South Carolina representing Spartanburg District during the Nullification Crisis. Being a strong Union man, he voted with the minority against the Ordinance of Nullification at the convention in 1832. The Ordinance overwhelmingly passed by a vote of 136–27. Major Rowland was a farmer in Spartanburg District and also held several positions of public trust serving as Tax Collector, Commissioner of Elections, and also served in the South Carolina House of Representatives.

He began purchasing land in Cass County (now Bartow), Georgia in 1838 and built a sizable plantation of over 2,500 acres which was called "Etowah Valley". He served as postmaster for Etowah Valley from 1841 to 1845. In 1843, he purchased 2,440 additional acres in Cass County (Bartow) about 9.5 miles northeast of his plantation and, built the most exclusive resort in the state of Georgia, Rowland Springs. Governor and Mrs. Joseph E. Brown were frequent guests there and four state governors vacationed there in one season. Renowned physician, scientist, conservationist, and educator, Joseph LeConte honeymooned at Rowland Springs in 1846. William Gilmore Simms, Southern poet, novelist, and historian, even mentions Rowland Springs in one of his works.

Among other notable friends of Major and Mrs. Rowland was Senator Stephen A. Douglas of Illinois who was hosted by them at Etowah Valley Plantation during his tour of the southern states in the spring of 1859.

From June 1–5, 1852, Major Rowland was a Georgia delegate to the Democratic National Convention in Baltimore, Md. He was a Unionist in a Georgia delegation that was evenly divided between Unionist and State's Rights delegates. After 49 ballots, Franklin Pierce of New Hampshire was nominated as the Democratic candidate for president with William King of Alabama as vice-president.

At age 59, Major Rowland stood 5' 10" tall, weighed approximately 210 pounds with dark hair and eyes and a swarthy complexion.

== Civil War and death ==
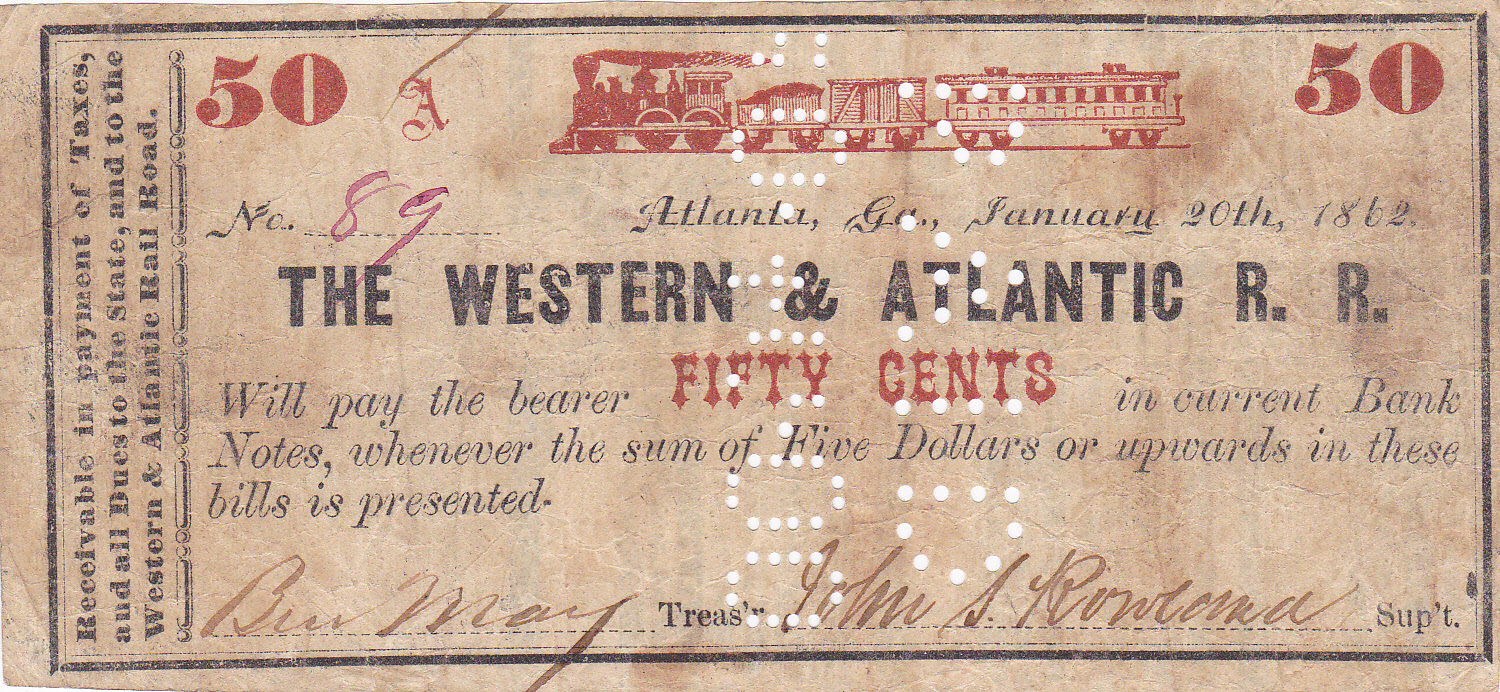
Western & Atlantic Railroad change bill with Rowland's signature

In September 1861, Major Rowland was appointed Superintendent of the Western & Atlantic Railroad, which ran between Atlanta, Georgia and Chattanooga, Tennessee a distance of 138 miles. He held this position until his death on September 18, 1863. It was during his tenure as Superintendent that Andrews' Raiders stole a locomotive, The General, from Big Shanty, Georgia, and the Great Locomotive Chase ensued ending in their capture just two miles north of Ringgold, Georgia.

John Sharpe Rowland was said to be "a liberal supporter to widows and orphans of the Confederacy during the Civil War". "His body was lowered into the grave on the 20th of September 1863 when the cannons were booming at the Battle of Chickamauga, over 60 miles away. The roar could be heard at the time and he expected to sleep there until the Resurrection." (as told by his daughter-in-law, Serena Jane Dillard Rowland [1834-1898]). John Sharpe Rowland is buried at Rowland Cemetery in Cartersville, Bartow County, Georgia with his wife, two sons, daughter, and three grandchildren.
