= Union Station (Chattanooga) =

Former train station in Chattanooga, Tennessee, U.S.

General information
- Location: Chattanooga, Tennessee
- Coordinates: 35.045416°N 85.311181°W
- System: Inter-city rail
- Lines: W&A, TA&G, NC&StL, M&C, ET&G, L&N

History
- Opened: 1859
- Closed: 1970 (demolished 1972)
- Rebuilt: 1882, 1900, 1926

Former services
Preceding station	Nashville, Chattanooga and St. Louis Railway	Following station
Wauhatchie toward Memphis	Main Line	Boyce toward Atlanta
Location
- Location within Tennessee

Chattanooga Union Station, more commonly known as the Union Depot in Chattanooga, constructed between 1857 and 1859, served as a train car shed in Chattanooga, Tennessee. Located at Broad and Ninth Streets (the latter now Martin Luther King Blvd), the station was one of two major railroad terminals in the city, the other being the Southern Railway's Terminal Station.

Modifications were added in 1868 and 1881 to include offices and waiting rooms. The train car shed was in use during and after the Civil War. After failed efforts to preserve the structure, the Union Depot was torn down in 1972.

== History ==
The Union Depot was constructed of limestone and brick; the bricks used were made by slaves. The center line of the train car shed was the boundary line between the Western & Atlantic Railway and the Nashville & Chattanooga Railway. During the Civil War, the train car shed was used as an army hospital. A head house was added in 1882, and the south end was demolished and replaced with butterfly sheds in 1926. In 1900, Georgian marble floors were added to the building, which was appropriate because Georgia owned the land that the Union Depot stood on.

Throughout the first four decades of the facility's operation, its ownership had been disputed between the state of Georgia (and by extension, the Western & Atlantic Railway and successors), the East Tennessee & Georgia Railroad, and the Memphis & Charleston Railroad, the latter two having leased portions of the property. The case was settled in the 1890s, when the courts ultimately ruled in favor of Georgia, and determined that the Western & Atlantic Railway and the Nashville & Chattanooga Railway were the rightful owners, the other two roads only having "vested rights" to its usage. The debate over ownership resulted in the organization of the Chattanooga Station Company in 1905. The company was formed by the three lines of the Southern Railway System (which had absorbed the East Tennessee & Georgia) and the Central of Georgia Railway, and opened the competing Terminal Station in 1909.

In 1901, the Western and Atlantic's General locomotive was placed on display in the station. It remained displayed until 1961, when Western & Atlantic's successor, the Louisville and Nashville removed the engine to be restored to operating condition. The engine then toured various parts of the eastern United States until 1967, when despite efforts by Chattanooga's then mayor Ralph Kelley to keep the engine in the city, the engine was ultimately given to the state of Georgia, who placed it on display in the Southern Museum of Civil War and Locomotive History, where it currently remains.

The last passenger train was the Louisville & Nashville's St. Louis and Chicago to Atlanta Georgian.

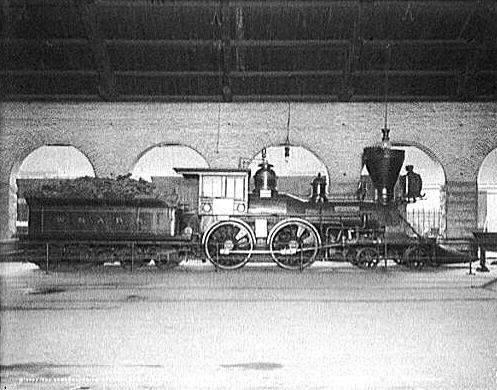
Western and Atlantic Railroad No. 3: The General, on display in Chattanooga Union Depot in 1907.

=== Passenger trains ===
Louisville & Nashville Railroad trains running on Nashville, Chattanooga and St. Louis Railway routes, making stops at Union Station included:

- Georgian – Chicago and St. Louis, Evansville, Nashville, Chattanooga, Atlanta

Chicago to Florida passenger service on the "Dixie Route":

- Dixie Limited – Chicago & St. Louis to Evansville, Nashville, Chattanooga, Atlanta, Macon, Albany, Jacksonville
- Dixie Flyer – Chicago & St. Louis to Evansville, Nashville, Chattanooga, Atlanta, Macon, Albany, Jacksonville
- Dixie Mail
- Dixie Flagler – Chicago to Evansville, Nashville, Chattanooga, Atlanta, Waycross, Jacksonville, Miami.

Nashville, Chattanooga and St. Louis Railway route, using Florida East Coast track for final leg of the trip.

- Tennessean NCStL train #3, 4 -Evansville, Nashville, Chattanooga, Atlanta, Augusta

== Restoration efforts and destruction ==
In 1971, an English class from University of Tennessee at Chattanooga taught by Dr. Tom Preston proposed a visionary plan to save the Union Depot from demolition. The plan proposed restoration and utilization as the center of a midtown mall. The class presented a paper and a video to the Chattanooga City Commission on July 19, 1971. Mayor Robert Kirk Walker recommended that the students take their presentation to the Downtown Development Committee. The Chattanooga Area Historical Association joined the fight to save the Union Depot in November 1971. However, on September 26, 1971, Georgia decided to sell some of the land it owned, including the depot site. The structure was torn down the following year, and the site currently houses office buildings. A historical marker was placed at the location of the Union Depot.

While the group was unsuccessful in saving the station, their efforts did manage to save Terminal Station from a similar fate.
