= The Texas (locomotive) =

Historic railroad locomotive in the US

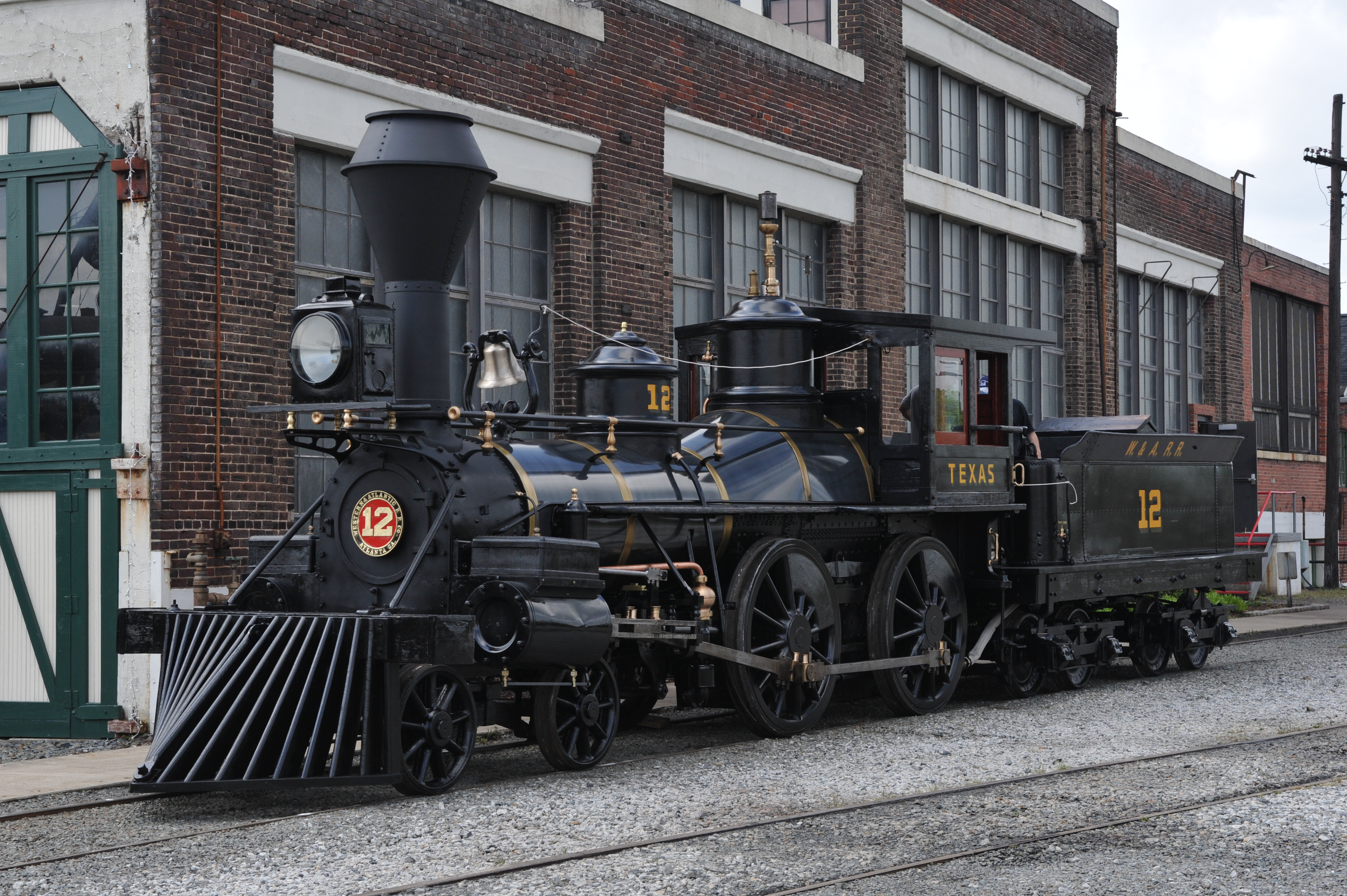
- The Texas, restored at the North Carolina Transportation Museum to its 1870s appearance, April 2017.
Type and origin
- Power type: Steam
- Builder: Danforth, Cooke and Company (engine and original tender); Mason Machine Works (extant tender)
- Build date: October 1856
Specifications
- Configuration
  - Whyte: 4-4-0
  - UIC: 2′B n
- Gauge: Originally: 5 ft (1,524 mm), Since 1886: 4 ft 8 1/2 in (1,435 mm)
- Driver dia.: 57 in (1,448 mm)
- Adhesive weight: 32,000 lb (14.5 tonnes)
- Cylinders: Two, outside
- Cylinder size: 15 in × 22 in (381 mm × 559 mm)
Career
- Operators: Western and Atlantic Railroad, Nashville, Chattanooga and St. Louis Railway
- Numbers: Numbered 49 in 1866, renumbered 12 in 1870, became NC&STL no. 212 in 1890
- Official name: Texas, renamed "Cincinnati" in 1870
- Retired: 1907
- Current owner: Donated to the City of Atlanta, Georgia on February 17, 1908
- Disposition: Static display

- The Texas
- U.S. National Register of Historic Places
- Location within Atlanta Location within Georgia Location within the United States
- Location: Atlanta, Georgia
- Coordinates: 33°44′1.78″N 84°22′15.42″W
- Built: 1856
- Architect: Danforth, Cooke & Co.
- NRHP reference No.: 73002234
- Added to NRHP: June 19, 1973

Western & Atlantic Railroad #49 "Texas" is a 4-4-0 "American" type steam locomotive built in 1856 for the Western & Atlantic Railroad by Danforth, Cooke & Co., best known as the principal pursuit engine in the Great Locomotive Chase, chasing the General after the latter was stolen by Union saboteurs in an attempt to ruin the Confederate rail system during the American Civil War. The locomotive is preserved at the Atlanta History Center.

== Antebellum ==
The Texas was built in October 1856 for the Western & Atlantic Railroad by locomotive manufacturer Danforth, Cooke and Company in Paterson, New Jersey, and subsequently shipped from Paterson to the Port of Savannah, thence delivered via the Georgia Rail Road & Banking Company and Macon & Western Railroad to the W&A headquarters in Atlanta.

The Texas provided freight and passenger service on the W&A's main line between Atlanta and Chattanooga, Tennessee.

== Civil War and the Great Locomotive Chase ==
At the onset of the Civil War, the locomotive primarily hauled local freight and cargo without any major incident. However, on April 12, 1862, the Texas, while pulling loaded 21 freight cars from Dalton southbound towards Atlanta, was commandeered by William Allen Fuller to chase down spies, led by James J. Andrews, during the "Great Locomotive Chase." Steaming in reverse after jettisoning the railcars, the Texas pursued the fleeing General over 51 miles before the raiders abandoned their stolen engine two miles north of Ringgold, Georgia. The Texas's engineer, Peter Bracken, towed the abandoned General back to Adairsville, Georgia, and then picked up his 12 cars and steamed into Atlanta, well behind schedule, but with good reason.

Following the incident, the Texas and nine boxcars were loaned to the East Tennessee & Virginia Railroad to haul salt and cargo from the mines at Saltville, Virginia in 1863. While in Virginia, the engine was captured by the U.S. Military Railroad (USMRR). Eventually, as Union forces made their way toward Atlanta, the W&ARR and its 46 other locomotives were captured as well.

== Postbellum ==
The USMRR returned the Texas, W&ARR, and its other locomotives to the State of Georgia on September 25, 1865. The engine continued to serve the W&ARR during the Reconstruction era, though under several different stewards as the public railroad was steadily privatized. The State of Georgia numbered the W&ARR's engines in 1866, leading to the Texas's designation as number 49.

In 1870, the W&ARR was leased out, for a period of twenty years, to a group of Georgia investors led by former war-time governor Joseph E. Brown. Alongside the W&ARR's other 44 locomotives at the time, the Texas was renumbered and renamed - becoming the Cincinnati, number 12. During the lease period, the engine received a new boiler (1877), was converted to burn coal, and was regauged (1886) as the W&ARR converted its entire locomotive rolling stock to the national standard gauge.

The W&ARR lease was renewed in 1890, though with a different lessee: the Nashville, Chattanooga and St. Louis Railway. The Texas remained the Cincinnati under the NC&StL and was renumbered 212.

In 1895, the engine was withdrawn from mainline service and stored on a siding in Vinings, Georgia. By 1903, the engine had briefly returned to service on a branch line serving a corn mill in Emerson, Georgia. It served there until its retirement in 1907, at which time it was sent to the W&ARR's yard in Atlanta, where it would await its disposition.

== Preservation ==
In August 1907, an article in the Atlanta Constitution brought to attention the deteriorated state of the locomotive and its historical significance. A fundraising effort began for its preservation. In response, NC&StL president John W. Thomas stated that he was willing to turn the engine to either the State of Georgia or the City of Atlanta, should either be willing to accept it. Accordingly, the Georgia General Assembly passed a resolution recognizing the need to preserve the engine. However, neither the railway nor the state took any physical action to move or protect the engine, which thus remained derelict on a siding.

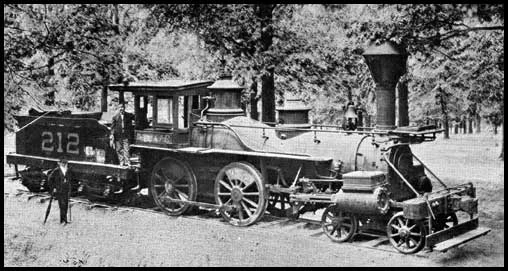
Texas still numbered 212 from its NC&StL days, on static display in Grant Park, circa 1910-1912

A grassroots campaign led by the Atlanta Georgian newspaper and an ad-hoc group (composed of the Atlanta chapter of the United Daughters of the Confederacy, the Inman Park Students' Club, and the Atlanta Woman's Club) succeeded in securing the locomotive for the City of Atlanta instead. On February 17, 1908, the Texas was officially donated to the "Ladies of Atlanta" by the NC&StL. The group, in turn, transferred the engine to the city.

However, despite the Texas's donation, the locomotive remained in the W&A yard. In 1910, Atlanta artist and historian, Wilbur G. Kurtz, began writing articles in the Atlanta Constitution advocating preservation of the Texas. The following year, the engine was moved to Grant Park, though it remained exposed to the elements and funds for its restoration were still lacking.

In 1927, the Texas was placed in the basement of the newly constructed Cyclorama, but remained unrestored or altered from its retirement appearance in 1907. As stated, during its service life, the Texas underwent numerous rebuilds and modifications. Most notably, the engine's smokestack was replaced with a diamond design suited for coal-burning, and its cowcatcher had been replaced with a wooden step for use in yard service. The locomotive's current tender originally belonged to the United States Military Railroad's Dalton locomotive, built in 1864 by the Mason Machine Works of Taunton, Massachusetts. The Dalton was sold to the Western & Atlantic after the war, renamed William MacRae, and operated on the W&A until retired in 1890, with its tender salvaged for the Texas when the latter was briefly returned to service in 1900.

In 1936, the locomotive, under the guidance of Kurtz, was cosmetically restored to an approximation of its wartime appearance. The engine's smokestack was replaced with one resembling the balloon design of the Civil War era, its horizontal strap-iron slat cowcatcher was restored, as were the nameplates on the sides of the boiler. The basement in which the engine was placed, while adequate to protect the engine, had been criticized for its small size which made viewing the engine difficult. As with the General, several proposals had been made as to where the Texas should be displayed, including placing it on display in the Atlanta Union Station, at the site of present-day Underground Atlanta, at Stone Mountain Park, among others - none of which materialized.

By the late 1960s and early 1970s, there was growing concern about the condition of the panoramic painting of the Battle of Atlanta (the Atlanta Cyclorama), which had suffered from storm damage as well as long periods of neglect. In 1972, the City of Atlanta developed plans to renovate the Cyclorama building, including a complete restoration of the painting as well as an enlarged display area for the Texas. However, the renovation did not begin until 1979, and was completed in 1982.

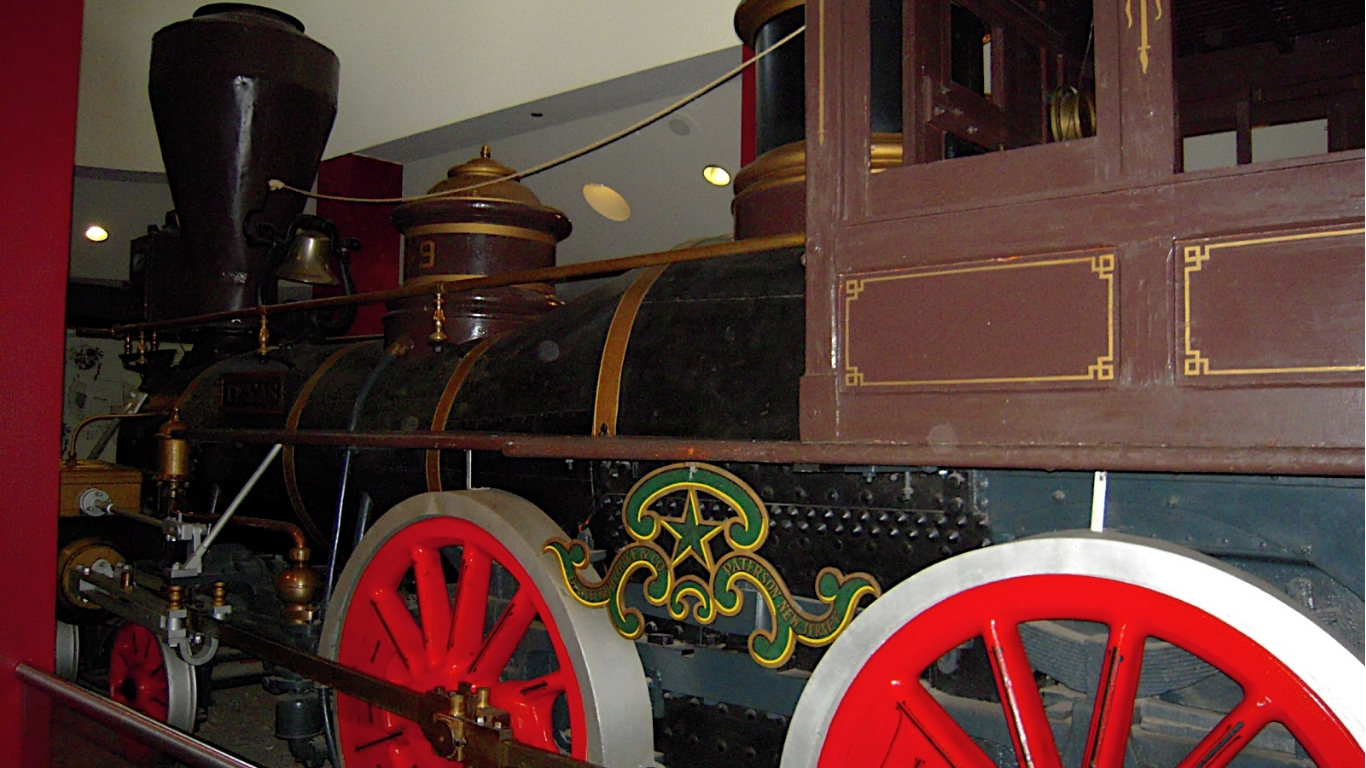
Texas displayed in the Cyclorama.

== Contemporary ==
After the 2008 restoration of The Battle of Gettysburg Cyclorama, focus shifted once more to the Atlanta Cyclorama and its deteriorated condition, prompting the City of Atlanta to explore another restoration and potential relocation of the painting. Ultimately, a decision was made to relocate and restore the painting, with a transfer ultimately including the Texas locomotive and other artifacts at the Atlanta Cyclorama and Civil War Museum as well.

Around this time, the cities of Marietta, Kennesaw, as well as the Southeastern Railway Museum in Duluth, Georgia expressed interest in acquiring the locomotive. However, city officials in Atlanta determined the engine should remain preserved in tandem with the painting.

In July 2014, the city of Atlanta announced that the Cyclorama collection, including the painting, locomotive, and other artifacts were to be relocated to the Atlanta History Center in Buckhead. The Texas was removed from the Cyclorama building in December 2015, marking the first time the Texas had been removed from the building since its 1981 remodeling. The engine received a cosmetic restoration performed at the North Carolina Transportation Museum by a private contractor, Steam Operations Corporation, who had previously restored the Norfolk and Western Railway no. 611 to operation at that facility, before being placed in the expanded history center.

The engine has been restored to its 1880s appearance, as opposed to the wartime appearance it had from the 1936 restoration. As such, it received a new diamond stack similar to the one it had when retired, as well as a new cowcatcher with vertical wooden slats (similar to that currently worn by the General), a black paint scheme, and was returned to its 1870s number, 12, though retains the Texas name, with a newly fabricated number plate to reflect the number. The old balloon stack, cowcatcher, and other removed elements from the 1936 restoration will remain in the history center's collection, and may be exhibited separately. The engine's new look caused a controversy in some circles, with critics saying the Texas's new look erased its Civil War history. Commenting on the engine's new appearance, Gordon Jones, of the Atlanta History Center, noted that the Texas was in service for fifty years, the Great Locomotive Chase occupying but a few hours of its service life, and said "We've already got one locomotive [the General] telling the story of the Great Locomotive Chase. We can utilize the Texas to tell a different story." The fully restored Texas was publicly unveiled by the North Carolina Transportation Museum on April 28, 2017, during a weekend long celebration in which it was exhibited alongside other engines at the museum, including the visiting Lehigh Valley No. 126 and the above mentioned Norfolk and Western no. 611.

The Texas was scheduled to begin its two-day move to the Atlanta History Center on May 3, 2017, but a logistical issue delayed the beginning of the move from North Carolina until May 4. It arrived on May 5. The Atlanta History Center's new Atlanta railroads exhibit, featuring the locomotive, opened on November 17, 2018. The Cyclorama painting and related exhibits opened to the public in spring 2019.

== Confirmation of legal ownership ==
On April 12, 2015, the 153rd anniversary of the Great Locomotive Chase, the Marietta Daily Journal published an article advocating the transfer of the Texas to the Southern Museum of Civil War and Locomotive History in Kennesaw, Georgia. Several state legislators indicated their support, arguing the locomotive was state property due to its association with the once-public W&ARR. Following the piece, the Georgia State Properties Commission requested a legal opinion from the State's Office of the Attorney General concerning the engine's ownership. The State Attorney General's office concluded that the Texas was property of the City of Atlanta given the evidence discovered, particularly citing the NC&StL's right to disposition of property as clarified in their 1890 and 1919 leases with the State of Georgia for the W&ARR. As a result, the donation of the Texas to the City of Atlanta on February 17, 1908, was a legally permissible transfer, meaning the City of Atlanta continues to hold ownership rights to the locomotive today.
