= Southern Museum of Civil War and Locomotive History =

Coordinates: 34.0240°N 84.6144°W

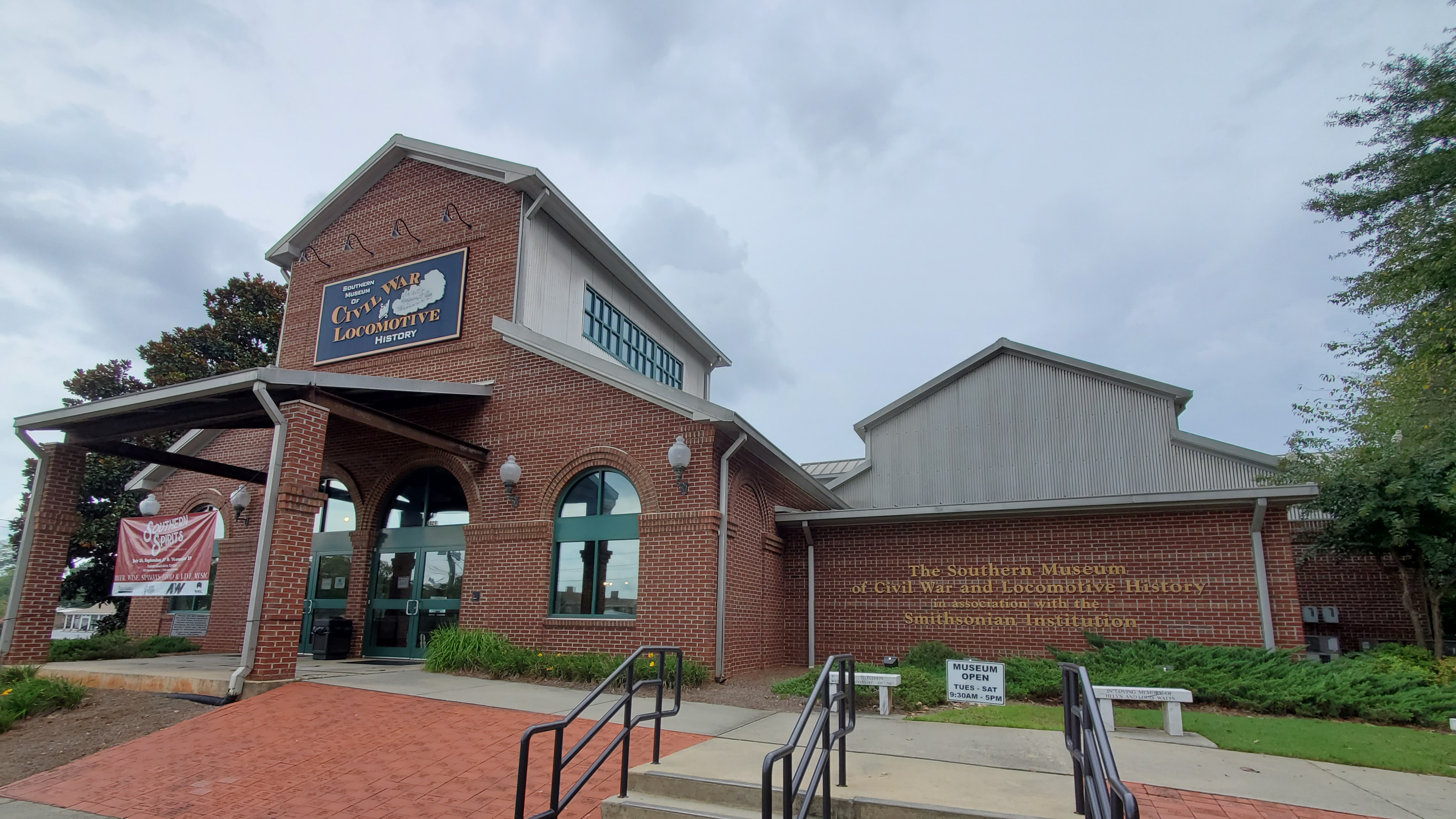

- Location within Georgia Location within the United States
- Former names: Big Shanty Museum, Kennesaw Civil War Museum
- Established: April 12, 1972
- Location: Kennesaw, Georgia
- Type: Technology museum
- Accreditation: Smithsonian Affiliate
- Key holdings: The General (locomotive)
- Collections: Locomotives, Civil War
- Collection size: 1,250 items
- Visitors: 40,000
- Executive directors: Richard Banz, D.E.D.
- Curator: Joshua Whitfield
- Website: https://southernmuseum.org/

The Southern Museum of Civil War and Locomotive History is a museum in Kennesaw, Georgia, that contains a collection of artifacts and relics from the American Civil War, as well as from railroads of the state of Georgia and surrounding regions. The centerpiece is the Western and Atlantic Railroad steam locomotive, the General, made famous for its role in the Great Locomotive Chase in April 1862.

The archives house a significant collection of company records, engineering drawings, blueprints, glass-plate negatives, photographs and correspondence from various American businesses representing the railroad industry in the South after the Civil War. The archives also contain a growing collection of Civil War letters, diaries, and official records.

== History and evolution ==
The Big Shanty Museum was conceived out of the need to provide a suitable home to preserve the General locomotive, which was being moved to Kennesaw in 1971, following a legal battle between the engine's owner, the Louisville and Nashville Railroad, and the City of Chattanooga concerning the engine's ownership. Steve Frey and his family owned a vacant former cotton gin building located across the street from the Kennesaw depot, which he donated to the city to serve as the home of the General.

The Big Shanty Museum opened to the public on April 12, 1972, on the date which the chase occurred one hundred and ten years prior, with the General as the centerpiece. Later, the theme expanded to include Civil War pieces as well.

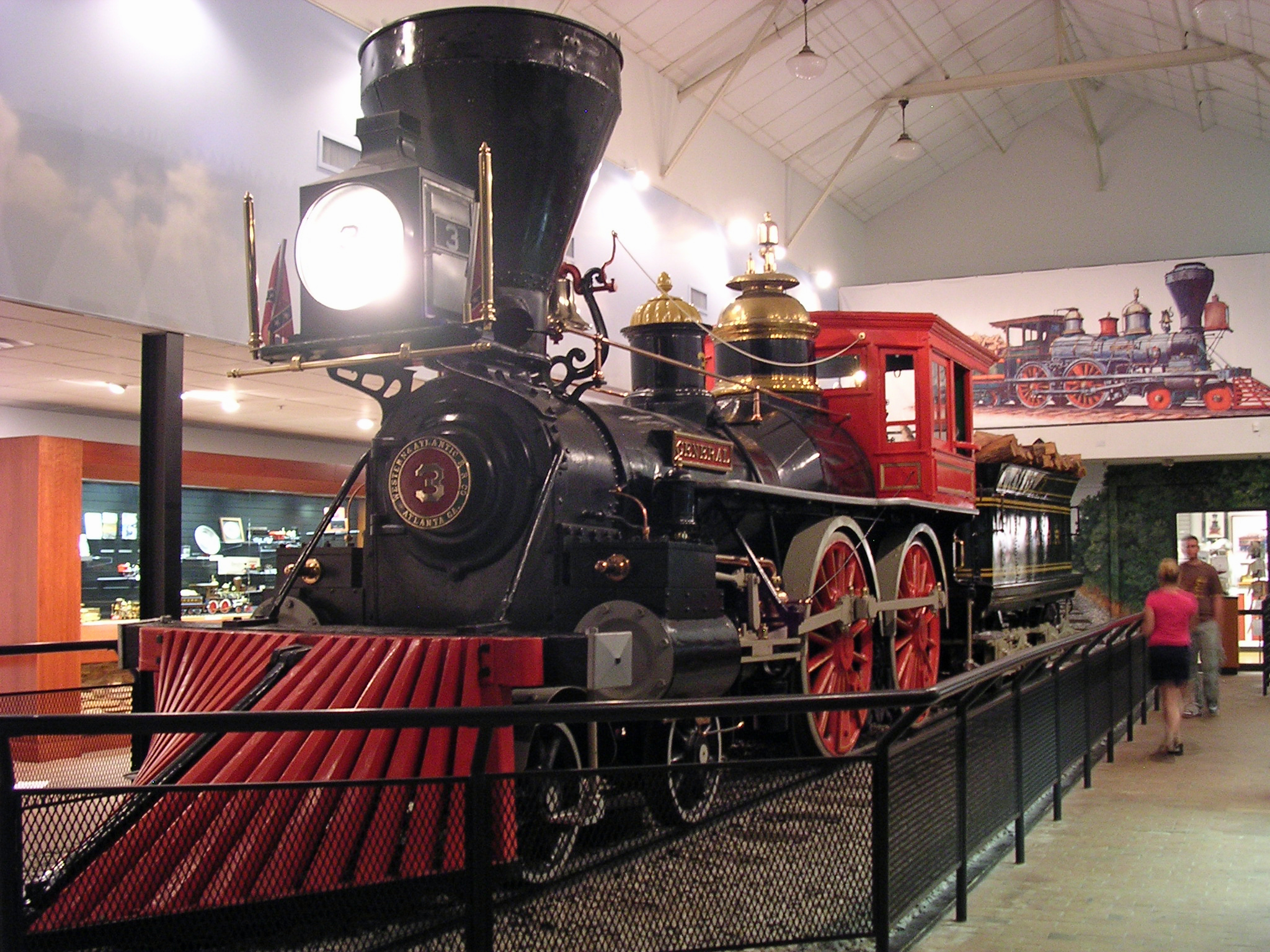
Western and Atlantic Railroad No. 3: The General, on display in Kennesaw, Georgia.

In the mid- to late 1990s, the property of the former Glover Machine Works was to be demolished. The buildings on this site, having sat vacant for nearly 50 years, still contained records, locomotive parts, machinery for locomotive construction, and at least one complete locomotive, which had only seen a few months of active service before being repossessed. Descendants of the Glover family, who had retained ownership of the firm and its collection, in turn donated the collection to the museum in 2001.

M1842 military musket on display

With the acquisition of the rather large collection of artifacts, the museum closed in late 2001 and began a massive expansion to house them. During the construction, a large box of plywood boards was built overtop of the General to protect it. The augmented museum reopened in March 2003 as the Southern Museum of Civil War and Locomotive History. A further expansion was finished in 2007 to house the recently acquired French Merci Boxcar.
