= The General (locomotive) =

Preserved American railroad locomotive

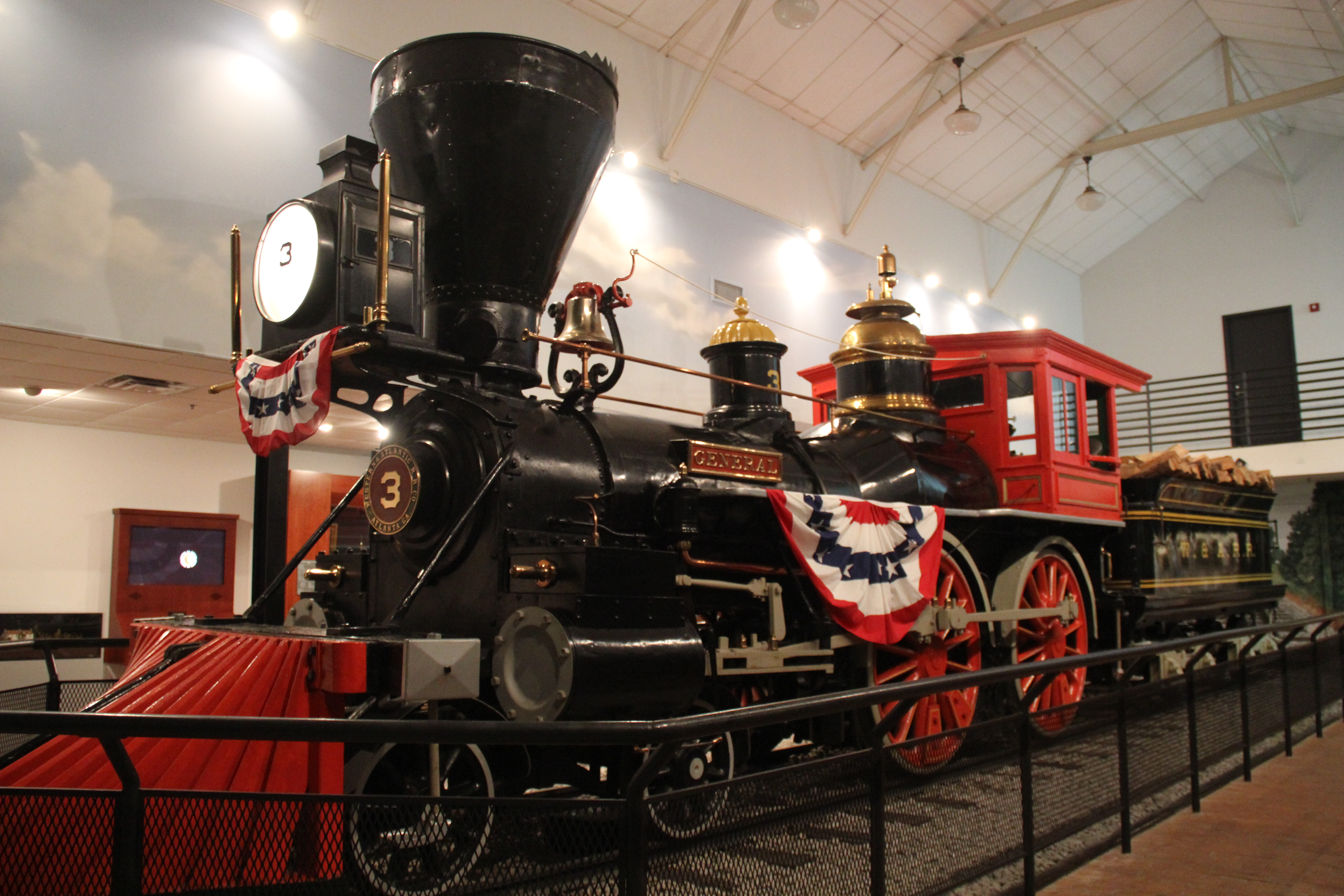
- The General on display in Kennesaw, Georgia, in 2007
Type and origin
- Power type: Steam
- Builder: Rogers, Ketchum & Grosvenor
- Serial number: 631
- Build date: December 1855
Specifications
- Configuration
  - Whyte: 4-4-0
- Gauge: Originally 5 ft (1,524 mm), regauged to 4 ft 8 1/2 in (1,435 mm) in 1886
- Driver dia.: 60 in (1,524 mm)
- Adhesive weight: 32,000 lb (15,000 kilograms; 15 tonnes)
- Loco weight: 50,300 lb (22,800 kilograms; 22.8 tonnes)
- Fuel type: New: Wood; Now: Coal
- Boiler pressure: 140 lbf/in^{2} (965 kPa)
- Cylinders: Two, outside
- Cylinder size: 15 in (381 mm)
Career
- Operators: Western and Atlantic Railroad, Nashville, Chattanooga and St. Louis Railway, Louisville and Nashville Railroad
- Numbers: 39, renumbered 3 in 1880
- Official name: General
- First run: January 1856
- Retired: 1891
- Current owner: Southern Museum of Civil War and Locomotive History
- Disposition: On static display
- The General
- U.S. National Register of Historic Places
- Location within Georgia Location within the United States
- Location: Kennesaw, GA
- Coordinates: 34°1′24.7″N 84°36′51.96″W
- Built: 1855
- Architect: Rogers, Ketchum & Grosvenor
- NRHP reference No.: 73000617
- Added to NRHP: June 19, 1973

Western & Atlantic Railroad #3 General is a 4-4-0 "American" type steam locomotive built in December 1855 by the Rogers, Ketchum & Grosvenor in Paterson, New Jersey for the Western & Atlantic Railroad, best known as the engine stolen by Union spies in the Great Locomotive Chase, an attempt to cripple the Confederate rail network during the American Civil War. Today, the locomotive is preserved at the Southern Museum of Civil War and Locomotive History in Kennesaw, Georgia, and is listed on the National Register of Historic Places.

== Before the Civil War ==
Built in 1855 by Rogers, Ketchum & Grosvenor in Paterson, New Jersey, The General provided freight and passenger service between Atlanta, Georgia, and Chattanooga, Tennessee, before the Civil War on the Western and Atlantic Railroad of the State of Georgia and later, the Western and Atlantic Railroad Company.

== Civil War ==
During the Civil War on April 12, 1862, the General was commandeered by Northerners led by James J. Andrews at Big Shanty (now Kennesaw, Georgia), and abandoned north of Ringgold, after being pursued by William Allen Fuller and the Texas. Low on water and wood, the General eventually lost steam pressure and speed, and slowed to a halt two miles north of Ringgold, where Andrews and his raiders abandoned the locomotive and tried to flee.

In 1864, the Battle of Atlanta had forced the withdrawal of General John Bell Hood's forces from the city. Hood ordered the ordnance depot destroyed as he left Atlanta on September 1, 1864, including any and all engines being either destroyed or rendered unusable for the approaching Union forces To this end, the locomotives General, Missouri, Etowah, the Macon and Western Railroad N.C. Monroe, and Atlanta and West Point Railroad's E.Y. Hill were sent colliding into boxcars loaded with ammunition, which were then set on fire. The severely damaged locomotives were left undisturbed by the invading United States Military Railroad Service, as was typically done with the equipment of railroads they had captured, remaining as such for the remainder of the war, as evidenced by the USMRR records listing the General as "captured and returned."

== Post-war service ==
After the war ended, the General was repaired and continued service on the Western and Atlantic. In the 1870s, the General was completely rebuilt, it had received a new pilot, boiler, and other components. Most notably, its three dome configuration was reduced to two domes, and its Radley-Hunter style balloon stack was replaced with a diamond stack, as the engine had been converted to burn coal. Indeed, the rebuilt engine had little resemblance to its original form.

Before the Civil War, most railways in the south, including the W&A, did not give their engines numbers. Rather, they were simply named, such as the General. When the railroad began numbering engines after the war, the General was the 39th engine to be acquired by the road, and was numbered accordingly. Locomotives came and went as years progressed, and by 1880, a renumbering was necessary. At this time, the General was given the number "3," being the third oldest engine that the railroad had at the time. The engine continues to carry this number today.

In the mid-1880s, the Atlanta and Florida Railroad began construction. During this time, the W&A had a locomotive surplus after buying several more modern engines, so they leased the General to the A&F from 1887 to 1888 to assist in construction.

The locomotive was originally built to the southern states standard rail gauge of 5 ft (1,524 mm). After a change to the northern states gauge was mandated by June 1, 1886, the General was converted to be compatible with the U.S. Standard Gauge of 4 ft 8 1/2 in (1,435 mm).

== Retirement and exhibition ==
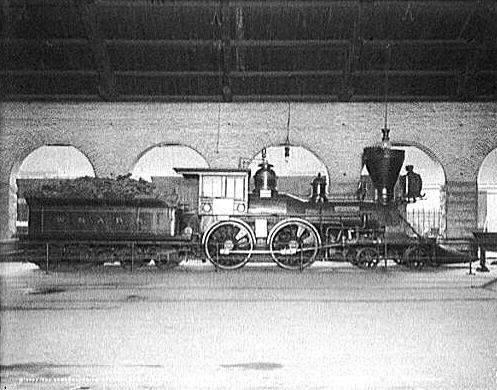
The General on display in Chattanooga, Tennessee circa 1907

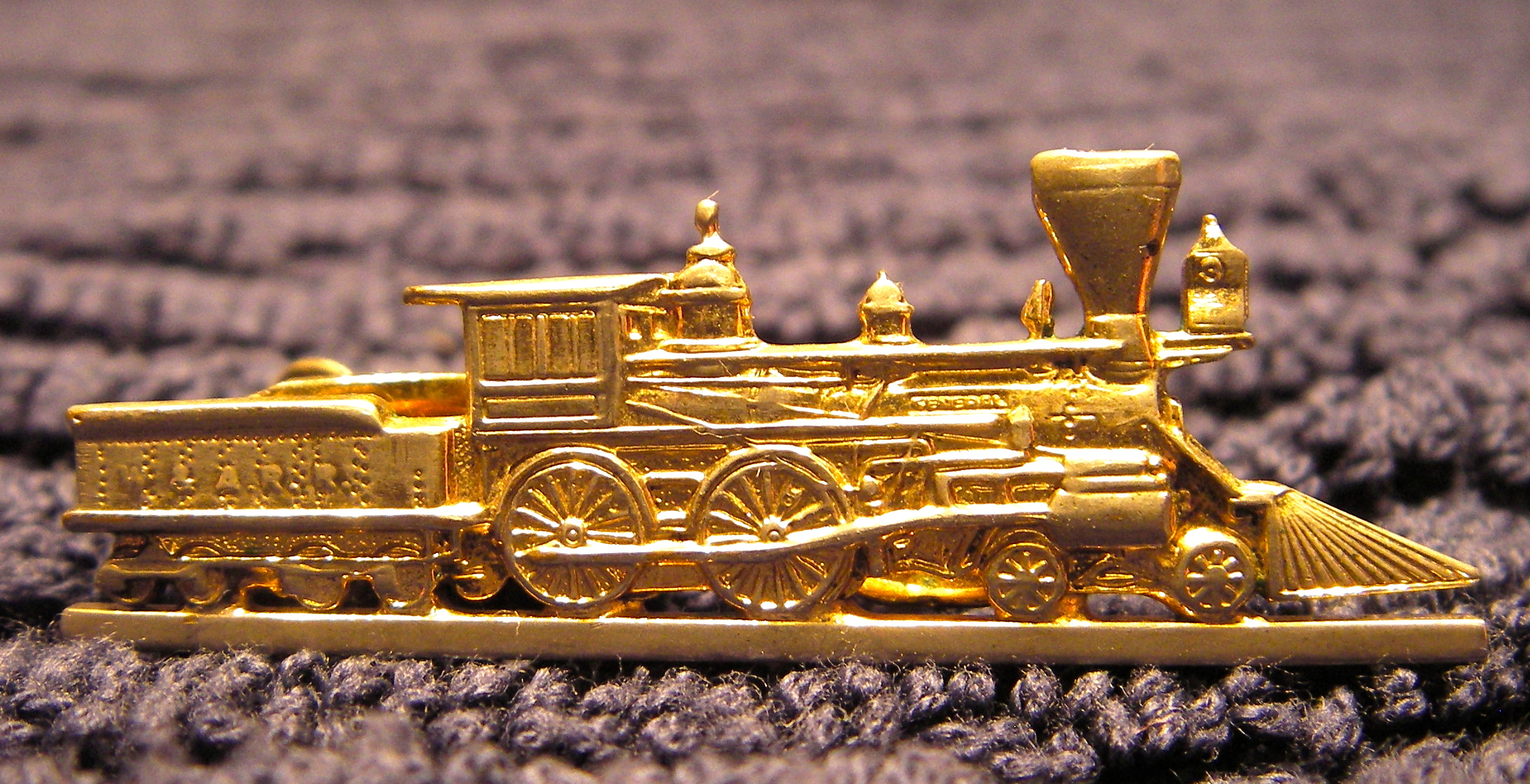
Commemorative tie clasp, produced in 1964 by the Louisville & Nashville Railroad as part of the General's tour marking the centennial of the Civil War

The General was retired from service in 1891 and stored on a siding in Vinings, Georgia, where it awaited its final fate. Early the next year, E. Warren Clark, a professional photographer, discovered the engine in Vinings, and approached John W. Thomas, president of the Nashville, Chattanooga and St. Louis Railway (NC&StL), which had won the lease on the Western and Atlantic Railroad of the State of Georgia in 1890, with a proposal to restore the General for exhibition at the upcoming World's Columbian Exposition in Chicago. Thomas approved of the idea, and the General was soon taken to the NC&StL Ry Shops in West Nashville to be restored. At this time, the engine was given a Radley-Hunter style balloon stack similar to the engine's original, and reverted to a wood burner. The engine was restored by 1892, a year before the exposition. During this time, the engine traveled to Chattanooga to attend a reunion of the Army of the Cumberland veterans. This trip made apparent the difficulties associated with wood burning, so the engine was returned to a coal burner by the end of the year. The engine was given a unique new stack at this time, one that, while designed for coal burning, was styled like the original so as to give the appearance of a wood burner.

In 1901, the General was placed on display in the Chattanooga Union Depot. There, it remained on display for nearly fifty years, only being removed for short periods for exhibitions. In particular, the engine was taken to Baltimore in 1927 to participate in the Baltimore and Ohio Railroad's "Fair of the Iron Horse", then in 1933 to Chicago's Century of Progress Exposition (also known as the Chicago World's Fair), the 1939 New York World's Fair, and finally, the Chicago Railroad Fair in 1948. The General, a 1926 movie by and starring Buster Keaton, premiered on February 5, 1927, with the engine bell from the train on display in the lobby to promote it.

In 1957, the Louisville and Nashville Railroad acquired the Nashville, Chattanooga and St. Louis, including its lease of the Western and Atlantic, and began planning to restore the General to operation for the American Civil War Centennial. In 1961, the General was removed from the Chattanooga Union Depot and taken to the railroad's South Louisville Shops to be restored. As part of the restoration, the General was given modern air brakes, a modern coupler (only on the tender, the older style coupler on the engine's front pilot remained), and was converted to burn oil. Throughout the 1960s, the engine pulled Louisville and Nashville Combine Car Number 665 as it traveled throughout the eastern United States railroad network, visiting several sites, including: Gettysburg station, the National Railroad Museum, the 1964 New York World's Fair, St. Louis Union Station, the National Museum of Transportation, and Barkley Dam.

== City of Chattanooga Custody Dispute ==
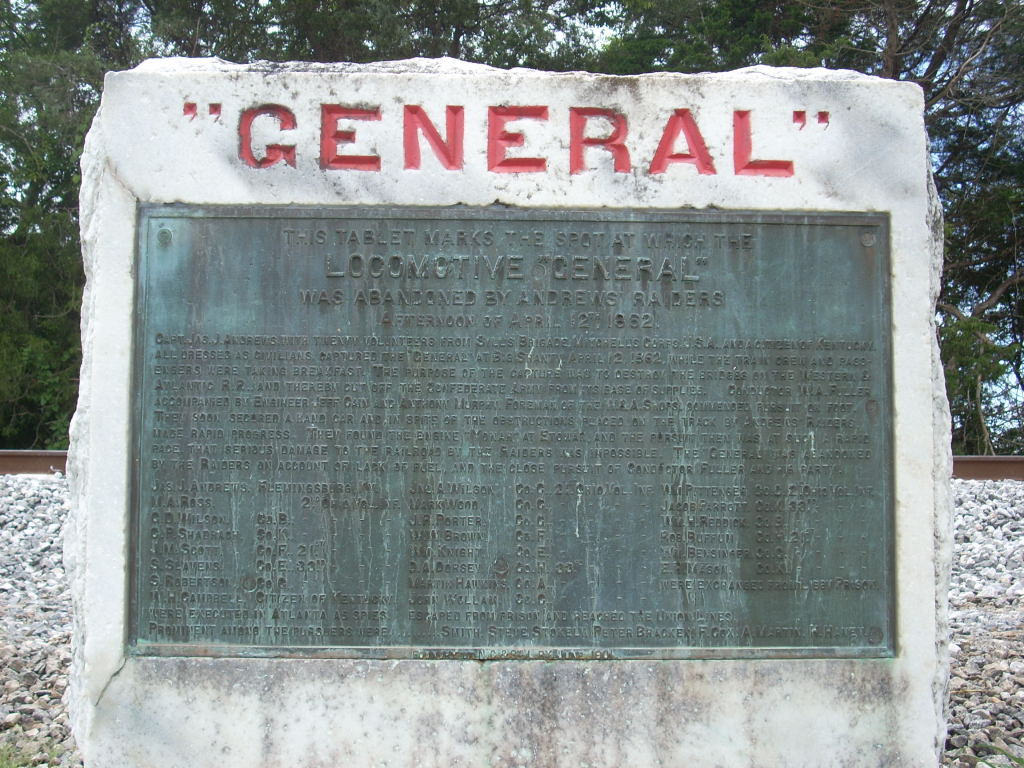
General Monument near Ringgold, Georgia

In the mid-1960s, the state of Georgia began to express interest in reclaiming the engine. Indeed, many proposals about the General had arisen since the 1930s, while it was still on display at Chattanooga, including plans to have the General be displayed in Underground Atlanta, Kennesaw Mountain, or at Stone Mountain Park, among others, some of which even included removing the Texas from the Cyclorama to be displayed with the engine. While much press coverage was given about these proposals, none of them had ever materialized. Even the city of Paterson, New Jersey, where the locomotive was built, expressed interest, since many engines had been built by Rogers and other firms in the city, but had none to display. Paterson eventually withdrew its proposal and sought other engines to display.

The state of Georgia's interest in the General soon raised tensions with the city of Chattanooga, where the General was displayed. In 1967, the city of Kennesaw, where the engine had been stolen in 1862, requested to have the engine attend a fundraiser held by the Big Shanty Historical Society. The General was on its way there, when it was stopped by a group led by Chattanooga's mayor, Ralph H. Kelley. He believed the engine belonged to the city, and a lawsuit had been filed against the L&N concerning custody of the engine.

On January 4, 1969, Judge Frank W. Wilson, U.S. District Judge in Chattanooga ruled that the engine belonged to the L&N, who could dispose of it as they desired. The city of Chattanooga appealed, and the case was referred to the U.S. Court of Appeals for the Sixth District. The latter upheld Wilson's ruling, and the city appealed once more, sending the case to the Supreme Court of the United States. The city of Chattanooga's appeal was dismissed by the Supreme Court on November 9, 1970, upholding and finalizing Wilson's ruling. The General was stored in Louisville during the legal dispute, only being publicly displayed over a weekend in November 1969, at the opening of the Kentucky Truck Assembly in the city's O'Bannon neighborhood, and again in November 1971, when it was displayed in the city's Union Station alongside the road's newer diesel engine no. 1776.

== Present day ==
After the L&N won the legal dispute concerning the engine's custody in 1970, they brought the engine to Atlanta via the former Atlanta, Knoxville and Northern Railway line from Knoxville through Etowah, to Marietta, bypassing Chattanooga. In February 1972, a ceremony was held in Atlanta where L&N president Kendall formally presented the General to then state governor (and later President of the United States) Jimmy Carter. Afterwards, the engine was moved to Kennesaw where a museum site was prepared. On April 12, 1972, the Big Shanty Museum (later known as the Southern Museum of Civil War and Locomotive History) opened, and the General has remained on display there since.

== See also ==
- The Texas, the other locomotive involved in the chase
- The General, 1926 film by Buster Keaton
- The Great Locomotive Chase, 1956 film by Walt Disney Productions
