= List of Tennessee railroads =

Railroads in Tennessee

The following railroads operate in the U.S. state of Tennessee.

== Common freight carriers ==
- BNSF Railway (BNSF)
- Canadian National Railway (CN) through subsidiary Illinois Central Railroad (IC)
- Canadian Pacific Kansas City (CPKC)
- Caney Fork and Western Railroad (CFWR)
- Chattooga and Chickamauga Railway (CCKY)
- CSX Transportation (CSXT)
- East Tennessee Railway (ETRY)
- Grenada Railroad (GRYR)
- Knoxville and Holston River Railroad (KXHR)
- KWT Railway (KWT)
- Mississippi Central Railroad (MSCI)
- Norfolk Southern Railway (NS) including subsidiaries Alabama Great Southern Railroad (AGS), Central of Georgia Railroad (CG), Cincinnati, New Orleans and Texas Pacific Railway (CNTP), Tennessee Railway (TENN), and Tennessee, Alabama and Georgia Railway (TAG)
- R.J. Corman Railroad/Memphis Line (RJCM)
- R.J. Corman Railroad/Tennessee Terminal (RJCK)
- R.J. Corman Railroad/Nashville and Eastern Railroad (NERR)
- R.J. Corman Railroad/Nashville and Western Railroad (NWR)
- Sequatchie Valley Railroad (SQVR)
- Smoky Ridge Railroad (SMO); owned by Watco; replaced the Heritage Railroad Corporation (HR) owned by EnergySolutions, LLC, in 2026
- South Central Tennessee Railroad (SCTR)
- Tennessee Southern Railroad (TSRR)
- Tennken Railroad (TKEN)
- Union City Terminal Railroad (UCTY)
- Union Pacific Railroad (UP)
- Walking Horse and Eastern Railroad (WHOE)
- West Tennessee Railroad (WTNN)

== Private freight carriers ==
- Franklin Industries
- Lhoist North America
- Southern Freight Logistics
- Tennessee Valley Authority

== Passenger carriers ==
- Amtrak (AMTK)
- Tennessee Overhill Heritage Association
- WeGo Star
- Tennessee Valley Railroad Museum

== Defunct railroads ==
Name	Mark	System (Note: This is one or more of the Class I railroads that the railroad became part of, if any.)	From	To	Successor	Notes
Alabama and Chattanooga Railroad		SOU	1868	1877	Alabama Great Southern Railroad	
Arkansas and Memphis Railway Bridge and Terminal Company		MP/ RI/ SSW	1912			Still exists as a nonoperating subsidiary of the Union Pacific Railroad
Athens and Tellico Railway		L&N	1910	1911	Louisville and Nashville Railroad	
Atlanta, Knoxville and Northern Railway		L&N	1896	1905	Louisville and Nashville Railroad	
Atlantic, Tennessee and Ohio Railroad		SOU	1852	1894	N/A	Sold at foreclosure; no property in Tennessee
Beaver Dam Railroad			1900	1918	N/A	
Belt Railway of Chattanooga		SOU	1895	1946	Alabama Great Southern Railroad	
Birmingham and Northwestern Railway		GM&O	1910	1929	Gulf, Mobile and Northern Railroad	
Bon Air Railway		L&N	1887	1887	Nashville, Chattanooga and St. Louis Railway	
Brimstone Railroad		SOU	1941	1965	Brimstone and New River Railway	
Brimstone and New River Railway		SOU	1965	1966	New River Railway	
Bristol, Elizabethtown and North Carolina Railway		SOU	1889	1895	Virginia and Southwestern Railway	
Burlington Northern Inc.	BN		1980	1981	Burlington Northern Railroad	
Burlington Northern Railroad	BN		1981	1996	Burlington Northern and Santa Fe Railway	
Cambria Southern Railway		L&N	1904	1904	Atlanta, Knoxville and Northern Railway	
Carolina, Clinchfield and Ohio Railway	CC&O	ACL/ L&N	1908	1990	CSX Transportation	
Carolina, Cumberland Gap and Chicago Railway		SOU	1882	1895	N/A	Sold at foreclosure; no property in Tennessee
Central of Georgia Railway	CG	CG	1901	1971	Central of Georgia Railroad	
Central Mississippi Railroad		IC	1877	1878	Chicago, St. Louis and New Orleans Railroad	
Central Southern Railroad		L&N	1853	1866	Nashville and Decatur Railroad	
Central of Tennessee Railway and Navigation Company	CTRN		1992	2000	Nashville and Western Railroad	
Charleston, Cincinnati and Chicago Railroad		ACL/ L&N	1887	1893	Ohio River and Charleston Railway	
Chattanooga Railway, Bridge and Terminal Company		SOU	1890	1892	Chattanooga Terminal Railway	
Chattanooga, Harrison and Cleveland Railroad		SOU	1850	1852	Chattanooga, Harrison, Georgetown and Charleston Railroad	
Chattanooga, Harrison, Georgetown and Charleston Railroad		SOU	1852	1854	East Tennessee and Georgia Railroad	
Chattanooga, Rome and Columbus Railroad		CG	1887	1891	Savannah and Western Railroad	
Chattanooga, Rome and Southern Railroad		CG	1897	1901	Central of Georgia Railway	
Chattanooga Southern Railroad		SOU	1896	1911	Tennessee, Alabama and Georgia Railroad	
Chattanooga Southern Railway		SOU	1894	1895	Chattanooga Southern Railroad	
Chattanooga Station Company		CG/ SOU	1905			
Chattanooga Terminal Railway		SOU	1892	1993	Alabama Great Southern Railroad	
Chattanooga Union Railway		SOU	1888	1895	Belt Railway of Chattanooga	
Chattanooga and Lookout Mountain Railway			1889	1928	N/A	
Chesapeake and Nashville Railway		L&N	1884	1892	Gallatin and Scottsville Railway	
Chesapeake, Ohio and Southwestern Railroad		IC	1881	1896	Chicago, St. Louis and New Orleans Railroad	
Chicago, Memphis and Gulf Railroad		IC	1909	1963	Illinois Central Railroad	
Chicago, Rock Island and Pacific Railroad	RI, ROCK	RI	1948	1980	N/A	
Chicago, Rock Island and Pacific Railway	RI	RI		1948	Chicago, Rock Island and Pacific Railroad	
Chicago, St. Louis and New Orleans Railroad		IC	1878	1951	Illinois Central Railroad	
Cincinnati and Charleston Railroad		SOU	1836	1837	Louisville, Cincinnati and Charleston Railroad	
Cincinnati, Cumberland Gap and Charleston Railroad		SOU	1853	1871	East Tennessee, Virginia and Georgia Railroad	
Cincinnati, Green River and Nashville Railroad		L&N	1882	1884	Chesapeake and Nashville Railway	
Cincinnati, Nashville, Southern Railway			1912	1934	N/A	
Cincinnati Southern Railway		SOU	1870			Still exists as a lessor of Norfolk Southern Railway operating subsidiary Cincinnati, New Orleans and Texas Pacific Railway
Clinchfield Railroad	CRR	ACL/ L&N	1924	1983	Seaboard System Railroad	
Coal Creek and New River Railroad		SOU	1877	1889	Knoxville and Ohio Railroad	
Corinth and Counce Railroad	CCR		1958	1991	TennRail Corporation	
Crandull and Shady Valley Railway			1909	1918	N/A	
Cumberland Railway		SOU	1902	1944	Southern Railway	
Cumberland and Big Stone Gaps Railroad		L&N	1889	1900	Louisville and Nashville Railroad	
Cumberland Plateau Railroad		TC	1901	1902	Tennessee Central Railroad	
Decatur, Chesapeake and New Orleans Railway		L&N	1887	1893	Middle Tennessee and Alabama Railway	
Duck River Valley Narrow Gauge Railroad		L&N	1872	1879	Nashville, Chattanooga and St. Louis Railway	
Dyersburg Northern Railroad		IC	1904	1909	Chicago, Memphis and Gulf Railroad	
East Tennessee and Georgia Railroad		SOU	1848	1869	East Tennessee, Virginia and Georgia Railroad	
East Tennessee and Virginia Railroad		SOU	1848	1869	East Tennessee, Virginia and Georgia Railroad	
East Tennessee, Virginia and Georgia Railroad		SOU	1869	1886	East Tennessee, Virginia and Georgia Railway	
East Tennessee, Virginia and Georgia Railway		SOU	1886	1894	Southern Railway	
East Tennessee and Western North Carolina Railroad	ETWN		1866	1983	East Tennessee Railway	
Edgefield and Kentucky Railroad		L&N	1852	1872	Nashville, Chicago and St. Louis Railroad	
Emory River Railroad			1918	1958		formerly the Emory River Lumber Company until 1943
Gallatin and Scottsville Railway		L&N	1906	1907	Louisville and Nashville Railroad	
Greenback Railroad		L&N	1905	1907	Louisville and Nashville Railroad	
Gulf and Chicago Railroad		GM&O	1889	1903	Gulf and Chicago Railway	
Gulf and Chicago Railway		GM&O	1903	1909	New Orleans, Mobile and Chicago Railroad	
Gulf and Mississippi Railroad	GMSR		1985	1988	SouthRail Corporation	
Gulf, Mobile and Northern Railroad	GM&N	GM&O	1915	1940	Gulf, Mobile and Ohio Railroad	
Gulf, Mobile and Ohio Railroad	GM&O	GM&O	1940	1972	Illinois Central Gulf Railroad	
Harriman Railway and Construction Company		SOU	1890	1891	Harriman Coal and Iron Railroad	
Harriman Coal and Iron Railroad		SOU	1891	1895	Harriman and Northeastern Railroad	
Harriman, Knoxville and Eastern Railroad		L&N	1910	1913	Louisville and Nashville Railroad	
Harriman and Northeastern Railroad		SOU	1895	1970	Cincinnati, New Orleans and Texas Pacific Railway	
Henderson and Nashville Railroad		L&N	1848	1867	N/A	Sold at foreclosure; no property in Tennessee
Hickman and Obion Railroad		L&N	1853	1855	Nashville and Northwestern Railroad	sold to Nashville and Chattanooga Railroad in 1872
Hiwassee Railroad		SOU	1836	1848	East Tennessee and Georgia Railroad	
Holston River Railway		SOU	1905	1908	Virginia and Southwestern Railway	
Holston Valley Railway			1892	1915	Bristol Traction Company	
Illinois Central Railroad	IC	IC	1883	1972	Illinois Central Gulf Railroad	
Illinois Central Gulf Railroad	ICG		1972	1988	Illinois Central Railroad	
Indiana, Alabama and Texas Railroad		L&N	1885	1887	Louisville and Nashville Railroad	
Iron Mountain Railroad of Memphis		MP	1886	1966	Missouri Pacific Railroad	
Jackson and Southeastern Railroad		IC	1905	1913	Chicago, St. Louis and New Orleans Railroad	
Jamestown Railroad			1912	1913	Oneida and Western Railroad	
Johnson City, Bakersville and Southern Railway			1905	1909	Unicoi Railway	
Johnson City and Carolina Railway		SOU	1887	1891	East Tennessee, Virginia and Georgia Railway	
Kansas City, Fort Scott and Memphis Railroad		SLSF		1901	St. Louis and San Francisco Railroad	
Kansas City and Memphis Railway and Bridge Company		SLSF	1887	1928	St. Louis – San Francisco Railway	
Kansas City, Memphis and Birmingham Railroad		SLSF	1886	1928	St. Louis – San Francisco Railway	
Kingsport Southern Railway		ACL/ L&N	1906	1906	South and Western Railroad	
Knoxville and Augusta Railroad		SOU	1878	1890	East Tennessee, Virginia and Georgia Railway	
Knoxville Belt Railroad		SOU	1887	1898	Southern Railway	
Knoxville and Bristol Railway		SOU	1898	1903	Southern Railway	
Knoxville and Carolina Railroad			1921	1926	Smoky Mountain Railroad	
Knoxville and Charleston Railroad		SOU	1852	1873	Knoxville and Augusta Railroad	
Knoxville, Cumberland Gap and Louisville Railroad		SOU	1888	1895	Knoxville, Cumberland Gap and Louisville Railway	
Knoxville, Cumberland Gap and Louisville Railway		SOU	1895	1898	Southern Railway	
Knoxville and Kentucky Railroad		SOU	1853	1871	Coal Creek and New River Railroad	
Knoxville, La Follette and Jellico Railroad		L&N	1902	1904	Louisville and Nashville Railroad	
Knoxville and Ohio Railroad		SOU	1871	1903	Southern Railway	
Knoxville, Sevierville and Eastern Railway			1907	1921	Knoxville and Carolina Railroad	
Knoxville Southern Railroad		L&N	1887	1890	Marietta and North Georgia Railway	
La Grange and Memphis Railroad		SOU	1835	1852	Memphis and Charleston Railroad	
Laurel Railway			1905	1926	N/A	
Laurel Fork Railway			1910	1925	N/A	
Lewisburg and Northern Railroad		L&N	1910	1915	Louisville and Nashville Railroad	
Lexington and Knoxville Railroad		SOU	1852	1853	Knoxville and Kentucky Railroad	
Little River Railroad	LR		1901	1940	N/A	
Livingston Terminal Company			1910	1911	Overton County Railroad	
Louisville, Cincinnati and Charleston Railroad		SOU	1837	1843	N/A	Sold at foreclosure; no property in Tennessee
Louisville and Nashville Railroad	L&N, LN	L&N	1851	1983	Seaboard System Railroad	
Louisville and Nashville Terminal Company		L&N	1893	1962	Louisville and Nashville Railroad	
Louisville, New Orleans and Texas Railway		IC	1884	1892	Yazoo and Mississippi Valley Railroad	
Marietta and North Georgia Railway		L&N	1890	1895	Atlanta, Knoxville and Northern Railway	
McCormick, Ashland City and Nashville Railroad	MACO		1988	1992	Central of Tennessee Railway and Navigation Company	
McMinnville and Manchester Railroad		L&N	1850	1875	Memphis and Charleston Railroad	sold to Nashville, Chattanooga and St. Louis Railway in 1877
Memphis, Birmingham and Atlantic Railroad		SLSF	1885	1887	Kansas City, Memphis and Birmingham Railroad	
Memphis and Charleston Railroad		SOU	1846	1898	Southern Railway	
Memphis–Chattanooga Railway		SOU	1899	1941	Southern Railway	
Memphis, Clarksville and Louisville Railroad		L&N	1852	1871	Louisville and Nashville Railroad	
Memphis, Holly Springs and Mobile Railroad		SLSF	1860	1869	Memphis, Holly Springs, Okolona and Selma Railroad	
Memphis, Holly Springs, Okolona and Selma Railroad		SLSF	1869	1870	Selma, Marion and Memphis Railroad	
Memphis, Holly Springs and Selma Railroad		SLSF	1881	1881	Memphis, Selma and Brunswick Railroad	
Memphis and Ohio Railroad		L&N	1853	1872	Louisville and Nashville Railroad	
Memphis, Paducah and Northern Railroad		IC	1878	1881	Chesapeake, Ohio and Southwestern Railroad	
Memphis, Selma and Brunswick Railroad		SLSF	1881	1885	Memphis, Birmingham and Atlantic Railroad	
Memphis and Southeastern Railroad		SLSF	1886	1886	Kansas City, Memphis and Birmingham Railroad	
Memphis and State Line Railroad		IC	1903	1908	Chicago, St. Louis and New Orleans Railroad	
Memphis Union Station Company	MUSC	L&N/ MP/ SOU/ SSW	1909	1976	N/A	
Mentor Southern Railway		L&N	1904	1904	Atlanta, Knoxville and Northern Railway	
Middle and East Tennessee Central Railway		L&N	1883	1897	Gallatin and Scottsville Railway	
Middle Tennessee Railroad			1907	1920	N/A	
Middle Tennessee and Alabama Railway		L&N	1893	1897	Nashville, Chattanooga and St. Louis Railway	
Middlesborough Railroad		L&N	1895	1896	Louisville and Nashville Railroad	
Middlesborough Belt Railroad		L&N	1890	1895	Middlesborough Railroad	
Mississippi Central Railroad		IC	1859	1874	New Orleans, St. Louis and Chicago Railroad	
Mississippi Central and Tennessee Railroad		IC	1853	1859	Mississippi Central Railroad	
Mississippi River Railway		IC	1858	1872	Paducah and Memphis Railroad	
Mississippi and Tennessee RailNet	MT		1998	2003	Mississippi Tennessee Railroad	
Mississippi Tennessee Railroad	MTNR		2003	2004	N/A	
Mississippi and Tennessee Railroad		IC	1853	1889	Chicago, St. Louis and New Orleans Railroad	
Missouri Pacific Railroad	MP	MP	1917	1997	Union Pacific Railroad	
Mobile, Clarksville and Evansville Railroad		L&N	1881	1885	Indiana, Alabama and Texas Railroad	
Mobile, Jackson and Kansas City Railroad		GM&O	1903	1909	New Orleans, Mobile and Chicago Railroad	
Mobile and Ohio Railroad		GM&O	1848	1940	Gulf, Mobile and Ohio Railroad	
Morgan and Fentress Railway			1914	1934	N/A	
Morristown and Carolina Railroad		SOU	1881	1882	Carolina, Cumberland Gap and Chicago Railway	
Morristown and Cumberland Railroad		SOU	1890	1898	Knoxville and Bristol Railway	
Morristown, Cumberland Gap and Ohio Railroad		SOU	1880	1882	Carolina, Cumberland Gap and Chicago Railway	
Nashville and Ashland City Railroad	NACR		1981	1988	McCormick, Ashland City and Nashville Railroad	
Nashville and Atlantic Railroad			1921	1939	N/A	
Nashville and Chattanooga Railroad		L&N	1845	1873	Nashville, Chattanooga and St. Louis Railway	changed name
Nashville, Chattanooga and St. Louis Railway	N&C, NC	L&N	1873	1957	Louisville and Nashville Railroad	
Nashville, Chicago and St. Louis Railroad		L&N	1872	1872	St. Louis and South Eastern Railway	
Nashville and Clarksville Railroad		TC	1901	1902	Tennessee Central Railroad	
Nashville and Decatur Railroad		L&N	1866	1990	CSX Transportation	
Nashville and Florence Railroad		L&N	1879	1887	Nashville, Florence and Sheffield Railway	
Nashville, Florence and Sheffield Railway		L&N	1887	1900	Louisville and Nashville Railroad	
Nashville and Knoxville Railroad		TC	1884	1902	Tennessee Central Railroad	
Nashville and Memphis Railroad		L&N	1852	1853	Memphis and Ohio Railroad	
Nashville and Northwestern Railroad		L&N	1850	1872	Nashville and Chattanooga Railroad	
Nashville and Tellico Railroad		L&N	1887	1893	Nashville, Tellico and Charleston Railway	
Nashville, Tellico and Charleston Railway		L&N	1892	1899	Tellico Railway	
Nashville Terminal Company		TC	1894	1937	Tennessee Central Railway	
Nashville and Tuscaloosa Railroad		L&N	1877	1884	Nashville, Chattanooga and St. Louis Railway	
Natchez Trace Railroad	NTR		1982	1993	Mississippi Central Railroad	
New Orleans, Jackson and Great Northern Railroad		IC	1852	1874	New Orleans, St. Louis and Chicago Railroad	
New Orleans, Mobile and Chattanooga Railroad		L&N	1867	1871	New Orleans, Mobile and Texas Railroad	
New Orleans, Mobile and Chicago Railroad		GM&O	1909	1915	Gulf, Mobile and Northern Railroad	
New Orleans, Mobile and Texas Railroad		L&N	1871	1880	N/A	Sold at foreclosure; no property in Tennessee
New Orleans and Ohio Railroad		IC	1866	1871	Paducah and Memphis Railroad	
New Orleans, St. Louis and Chicago Railroad		IC	1874	1877	Central Mississippi Railroad	
New River Railway		SOU	1966	1970	Cincinnati, New Orleans and Texas Pacific Railway	
Oakdale and Cumberland Mountain Railroad		SOU	1879	1882	Walden's Ridge Railroad	
Ohio River and Charleston Railway		ACL/ L&N	1894	1902	South and Western Railway	
Oneida and Western Railroad	OD&W		1913	1954	N/A	
Ooltewah and Red Clay Railroad		SOU	1881	1882	Tennessee State Line Railroad	
Overton County Railroad			1904	1912	Cincinnati, Nashville, Southern Railway	
Paducah and Memphis Railroad		IC	1872	1877	Memphis, Paducah and Northern Railroad	
Paducah and Tennessee Railroad		L&N	1854	1889	Paducah, Tennessee and Alabama Railroad	
Paducah and Tennessee Railway		L&N	1888	1889	Paducah, Tennessee and Alabama Railroad	
Paducah, Tennessee and Alabama Railroad		L&N	1890	1895	Louisville and Nashville Railroad	
Powells Valley Railroad		SOU	1887	1888	Knoxville, Cumberland Gap and Louisville Railroad	
Powells Valley Railway		SOU	1886	1887	Powells Valley Railroad	
Ripley Railroad		GM&O	1871	1872	Ship Island, Ripley and Kentucky Railroad	
Rock Island Memphis Terminal Railway		RI	1913	1948	Chicago, Rock Island and Pacific Railroad	
Rockwood and Tennessee River Railway			1867	1911	N/A	
Rogersville and Jefferson Railroad		SOU	1852	1873	East Tennessee, Virginia and Georgia Railway	
St. Louis, Iron Mountain and Southern Railway		MP		1917	Missouri Pacific Railroad	
St. Louis and San Francisco Railroad		SLSF	1901	1916	St. Louis – San Francisco Railway	
St. Louis – San Francisco Railway	SLSF	SLSF	1916	1980	Burlington Northern Inc.	
St. Louis and South Eastern Railway		L&N	1872	1879	Louisville and Nashville Railroad	
St. Louis Southwestern Railway	SSW	SSW	1912	1997	Union Pacific Railroad	
Savannah and Western Railroad		CG	1891	1894	Chattanooga, Rome and Southern Railroad	
Seaboard System Railroad	SBD		1983	1986	CSX Transportation	
Selma, Marion and Memphis Railroad		SLSF	1870	1881	Memphis, Holly Springs and Selma Railroad	
Sequatchie Valley Railroad		L&N	1868	1877	Nashville, Chattanooga and St. Louis Railway	
Ship Island, Ripley and Kentucky Railroad		GM&O	1872	1889	Gulf and Chicago Railroad	
Smoky Mountain Railroad			1926	1961	N/A	
South and Western Railroad		ACL/ L&N	1906	1908	Carolina, Clinchfield and Ohio Railway	
South and Western Railway		ACL/ L&N	1901	1906	Kingsport Southern Railway, South and Western Railroad	
Southern Railway	SOU	SOU	1894	1990	Norfolk Southern Railway	
Southern Freight Railroad	SFR		1997	2003	Heritage Railroad	
SouthRail Corporation	SR		1988	1993	Kansas City Southern Railway	
Southwestern Railroad		L&N	1852	1877	Nashville, Chattanooga and St. Louis Railway	
Swan Creek Railway		L&N	1906	1921	Louisville and Nashville Railroad	
Tellico Railroad		L&N	1887	1887	Nashville and Tellico Railroad	
Tellico Railway		L&N	1898	1910	Athens and Tellico Railway	
Tennessee Railroad	TENN	SOU	1918	1973	Tennessee Railway	
Tennessee Railway		SOU	1904	1918	Tennessee Railroad	
Tennessee and Alabama Railroad		L&N	1852	1866	Nashville and Decatur Railroad	
Tennessee, Alabama and Georgia Railroad		SOU	1911	1922	Tennessee, Alabama and Georgia Railway	
Tennessee and Carolina Southern Railway		SOU	1902	1935	N/A	
Tennessee Central Railroad	TC	TC	1902	1922	Tennessee Central Railway	
Tennessee Central Railroad		TC	1893	1897	Tennessee Central Railway	
Tennessee Central Railroad			1883	1891	N/A	
Tennessee Central Railway	TC	TC	1922	1968	Harriman and Northeastern Railroad, Illinois Central Railroad, Louisville and Nashville Railroad	
Tennessee Central Railway		TC	1897	1902	Tennessee Central Railroad	
Tennessee and Cumberland River Railroad			1897	1915	N/A	
Tennessee, Kentucky and Northern Railroad			1912	1934	N/A	
Tennessee Midland Railway		L&N	1886	1895	Louisville and Nashville Railroad	
Tennessee and North Carolina Railroad			1900	1920	Tennessee and North Carolina Railway	
Tennessee and North Carolina Railway			1920	1951	N/A	
Tennessee Northern Railway		SOU	1896	1903	Knoxville and Ohio Railroad	
Tennessee and Ohio Railroad		SOU	1884	1889	East Tennessee, Virginia and Georgia Railway	
Tennessee and Pacific Railroad		L&N	1866	1877	Nashville, Chattanooga and St. Louis Railway	
Tennessee and Sequatchie Valley Railroad			1880	1883	Tennessee Central Railroad	
Tennessee Southern Railroad		IC	1881	1884	Louisville, New Orleans and Texas Railway	
Tennessee State Line Railroad		SOU	1882	1886	East Tennessee, Virginia and Georgia Railroad	
Tennessee Valley Railroad		SOU	1887	1888	East Tennessee, Virginia and Georgia Railway	
Tennessee Western Railroad		L&N	1912	1939	N/A	
TennRail Corporation			1991	1993	Kansas City Southern Railway	
Troy and Tiptonville Railroad		IC	1887	1903	Chicago, St. Louis and New Orleans Railroad	
Unicoi Railway			1909	1918	N/A	
Union Railway	URY	MP	1886	1966	Missouri Pacific Railroad	
Union Railway		SOU	1883	1888	Chattanooga Union Railway	
Virginia and Southwestern Railway		SOU	1899			Still exists as a nonoperating subsidiary of the Norfolk Southern Railway
Walden's Ridge Railroad		SOU	1877	1888	East Tennessee, Virginia and Georgia Railway	
Wauhatchie Extension Railway		SOU	1914	1917	Alabama Great Southern Railroad	
West Nashville Railway		L&N	1887	1887	Nashville, Chattanooga and St. Louis Railway	
Western and Atlantic Railroad		L&N	1848			Still exists as a lessor of CSX Transportation
Wills Valley Railroad		SOU	1854	1868	Alabama and Chattanooga Railroad	
Yazoo and Mississippi Valley Railroad		IC	1892	1946	Illinois Central Railroad	

Private carriers

- Babcock Lumber Company
- Dayton Iron and Coal Company

Electric

- Bristol Traction Company
- Chattanooga and Lookout Mountain Railway
- Fountain Head Railroad
- Memphis Street Railway
- Nashville–Franklin Railway

Not completed

- Brownsville and Ohio Railroad
- Holly Springs, Brownsville and Ohio Railroad
- Memphis and Knoxville Railroad
- Memphis and Raleigh Railroad
