= List of railroads of the Confederate States of America =

This is a list of Confederate Railroads in operation or used by the Confederate States of America during the American Civil War. See also Confederate railroads in the American Civil War. At the outset of the war, the Confederacy possessed the third largest set of railroads of any nation in the world, with about 9,000 miles of railroad track. Southern companies, towns, cities as well as state governments were heavy investors in railroad companies, which were typically designed as feeder lines linking farming centers to port cities.

== Railroads and railroad companies ==
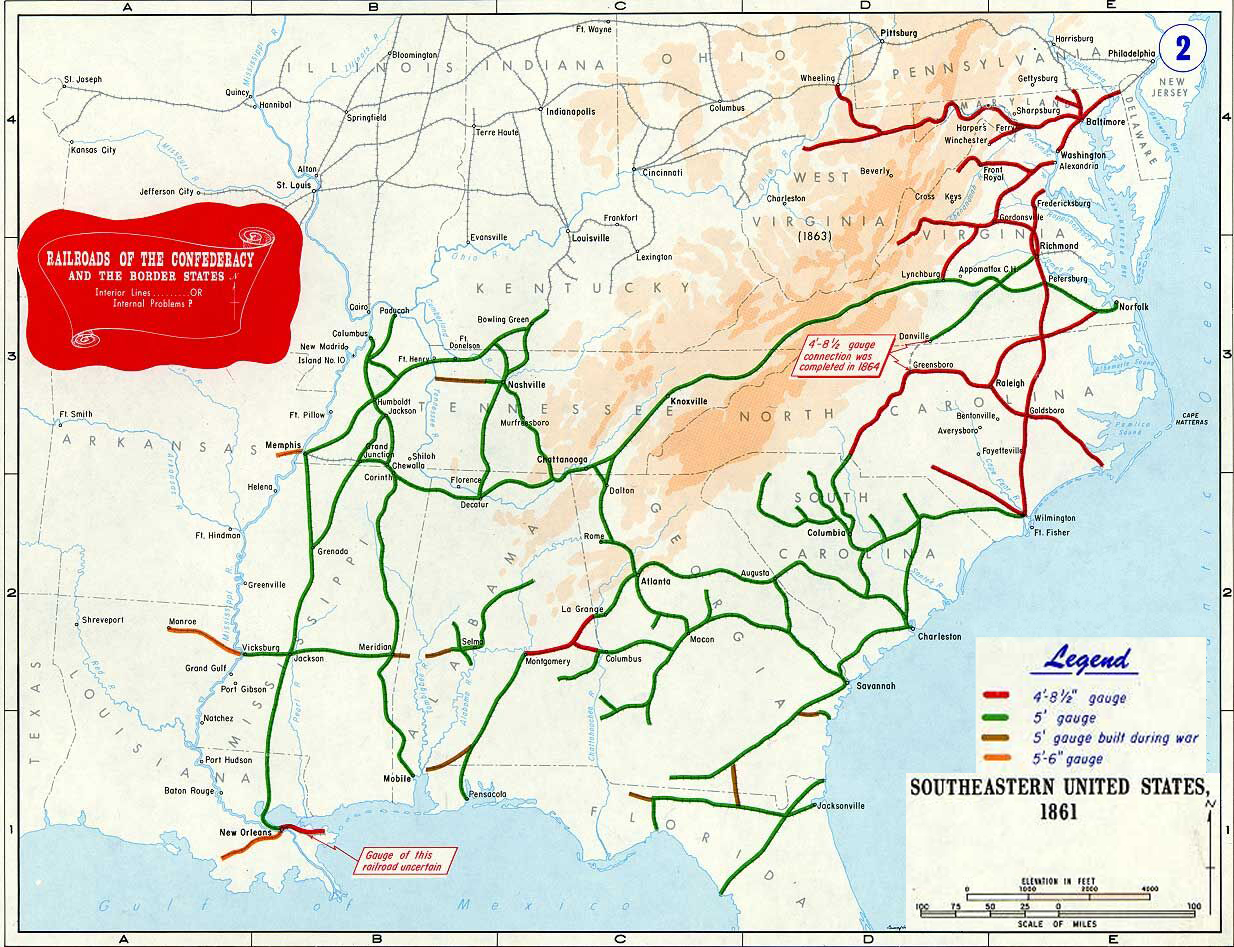

- Alabama and Florida Railroad
- Alabama and Mississippi Rivers Railroad
- Alabama and Tennessee River Railroad
- Alabama Coal Company Railroad
- Alexandria and Cheneyville Railroad
- Alexandria, Loudoun and Hampshire Railroad
- Allen's Plantation Railroad
- Atlanta and West Point Railroad
- Atlantic and Gulf Railroad
- Atlantic and North Carolina Railroad
- Atlantic, Tennessee and Ohio Railroad
- Augusta and Milledgeville Railroad
- Augusta and Savannah Railroad
- Baton Rouge, Grosse Tete and Opelousa Railroad
- Baltimore and Ohio Railroad
- Blue Ridge Railroad
- Blue Ridge Railroad of South Carolina
- Brunswick and Albany Railroad
- Brunswick and Florida Railroad
- Buffalo Bayou, Brazos and Colorado Railroad
- Cahaba, Marion and Greensboro Railroad
- Central Railroad of Georgia
- Central Southern Railroad
- Centreville Military Railroad
- Charlotte and South Carolina Railroad
- Charleston and Savannah Railroad
- Cheraw and Darlington Railroad
- Clinton and Port Hudson Railroad
- Clover Hill Railroad
- East Tennessee and Georgia Railroad
- East Tennessee and Virginia Railroad
- Eastern Texas Railroad
- Edgefield and Kentucky Railroad
- Etowah Railroad
- Florida Railroad
- Florida, Atlantic and Gulf Central Railroad
- Galveston, Houston and Henderson Railroad
- Galveston and Houston Junction Railroad
- Georgia Railroad
- Gordon's Mine Railroad
- Grand Gulf and Port Gibson Railroad
- Greenville and Columbia Railroad
- Houston & Texas Central Railroad
- Houston Tap and Brazoria Railroad
- Jefferson and Lake Pontchartrain Railroad
- King’s Mountain Railroad
- Knoxville and Kentucky Railroad
- Laurens Railroad
- Louisville and Nashville Railroad
- Macon and Brunswick Railroad
- Macon and Western Railroad
- Manassas Gap Railroad
- McMinnville and Manchester Railroad
- Memphis and Charleston Railroad
- Memphis and Little Rock Railroad
- Memphis and Ohio Railroad
- Memphis, Clarksville and Louisville Railroad
- Memphis, El Paso and Pacific Railroad
- Mexican Gulf Railroad
- Milledgeville Railroad
- Mississippi Central Railroad
- Mississippi, Gainesville and Tuscaloosa Railroad
- Mississippi and Tennessee Railroad
- Mississippi, Ouachita and Red River Railroad
- Mobile and Girard Railroad
- Mobile and Great Northern Railroad
- Mobile and Ohio Railroad
- Montevallo Coal Railroad
- Montgomery and Eufaula Railroad
- Montgomery and West Point Railroad
- Muscogee Railroad
- Nashville and Chattanooga Railroad
- Nashville and Decatur Railroad
- Nashville and Northwestern Railroad
- New Orleans and Carrollton Railroad
- New Orleans and Ohio Railroad
- New Orleans, Jackson and Great Northern Railroad
- New Orleans, Opelousas and Great Western Railroad
- Norfolk and Petersburg Railroad
- North Carolina Railroad
- Northeast and Southwest Alabama Railroad
- Northeastern Railroad
- Northwestern Virginia Railroad
- Orange and Alexandria Railroad
- Pensacola and Georgia Railroad
- Pensacola and Mobile Railroad
- Petersburg Railroad
- Piedmont Railroad
- Pontchartrain Railroad
- Raleigh and Gaston Railroad
- Raymond Railroad
- Red River Railroad
- Richmond and Danville Railroad
- Richmond and Petersburg R.R. Company
- Richmond and York River Railroad
- Richmond, Fredericksburg and Potomac Railroad
- Roanoke Valley Railroad
- Rogersville and Jefferson Railroad
- Rome Railroad
- San Antonio and Mexican Gulf Railroad
- Savannah, Albany and Gulf Railroad
- Seaboard and Roanoke Railroad
- Selma and Meridian Railroad
- Shelby Iron Company Railroad
- South and North Alabama Railroad
- South Carolina Railroad
- Southside Railroad
- South Western Railroad
- Southern Railroad of Mississippi
- Southern Pacific Railroad
- Spartanburg and Union Railroad
- Spring Hill Railroad
- Tallahassee Railroad
- Tennessee and Alabama Railroad
- Tennessee and Alabama Central Railroad
- Tennessee Coal and Railroad
- Texas and New Orleans Railroad
- Tuckahoe and James River Railroad
- Tuskegee Railroad
- Upson County Railroad
- Vicksburg, Shreveport and Texas Railroad
- Virginia and Tennessee Railroad
- Virginia Central Railroad
- Washington County Railroad
- West Feliciana Railroad
- Western & Atlantic Railroad of the State of Georgia 1,524 mm (5 ft) gauge
- Western Railroad of Alabama
- Western North Carolina Railroad
- Wills Valley Railroad
- Wilmington, Charlotte and Rutherford Railroad
- Wilmington and Manchester Railroad
- Wilmington and Weldon Railroad
- Winchester and Alabama Railroad
- Winchester and Potomac Railroad

== Railroad tunnels ==
- Blue Ridge Tunnel
