= French Broad and Atlantic Railway =

Former railroad in South Carolina, USA

Overview
- Dates of operation: 1882–1882
- Successor: Carolina, Cumberland Gap and Chicago Railway

Technical
- Track gauge: 4 ft 8 1/2 in (1,435 mm) standard gauge

The French Broad and Atlantic Railway was a railroad that served western South Carolina in the late 19th century.

== Creation ==
The French Broad and Atlantic was formed in January 1882 when the Edgefield, Trenton and Aiken Railroad was consolidated with the Atlantic and French Broad Valley Railroad

== Consolidation ==
In October 1882, the French Broad and Atlantic was consolidated with the Atlantic and French Broad Valley Railroad Company (of North Carolina), the Morristown, Cumberland Gap and Ohio Railroad, the Morristown and Carolina Railroad, and the Cumberland Railway to form the Carolina, Cumberland Gap and Chicago Railway.

== See also ==
- Atlantic and French Broad Valley Railroad
- Belton, Williamston and Easley Railroad
- Carolina and Cumberland Gap Railway
- Carolina, Cumberland Gap and Chicago Railway
- Edgefield Branch Railroad
- Edgefield, Trenton and Aiken Railroad
