= SCTR =

SCTR may refer to:

- Secretin receptor, a human protein
- South Central Tennessee Railroad
