= Fort Randolph (Pineville, Louisiana) =

- U.S. National Register of Historic Places
- Location within Louisiana Location within the United States
- Location: Off U.S. 165, Pineville, Louisiana
- Coordinates: 31°18′53″N 92°26′54″W
- Area: 0.3 acres (0.12 ha)
- Built: 1864
- NRHP reference No.: 81000300
- Added to NRHP: June 01, 1981

Fort Randolph was built in late 1864 by Confederate force as a defense against an expected third invasion by Union forces of the Louisiana Red River Valley in 1865. The fort was named for Captain Chistopher M. Randolph who was in charge of its construction.

After the 1864 Red River Campaign, Confederate General Edmund Kirby Smith, commander of the confederate Trans-Mississippi Department, realized the need for fortifications along the Red River that could prevent Union naval vessels from ascending the river past Alexandria Louisiana.

The fort had an outer ditch and central earthen citadel with gun positions, magazine, and bombproof shelters for the garrison. It is estimated that the fort held from 4 to 8 guns. It was built in tandem with Fort Buhlow (located just to the north of Fort Randolph). It was sited on a hill overlooking the rapides in the Red River then in existence and the remains of Bailey's Dam which had been built in May 1864. The fort was built mainly by free Negroes and slaves who were conscripted to provide labor. Confederate soldiers from units stationed in the area also contributed to the construction so that the fort would be completed before the start of the campaigning season in the spring of 1865.

The fort was not involved in any action during the American Civil War. The fort was surrendered to Union forces on June 3, 1865.

The United Daughters of the Confederacy held a ceremony to place markers at Forts Randolph and Buhlow in October 1927.

It was added to the National Register of Historic Places on June 1, 1981.

Fort Randolph became part of the Forts Randolph and Buhlow State Historic Site in November 2010.

== Gallery ==
Images of Fort Randolph
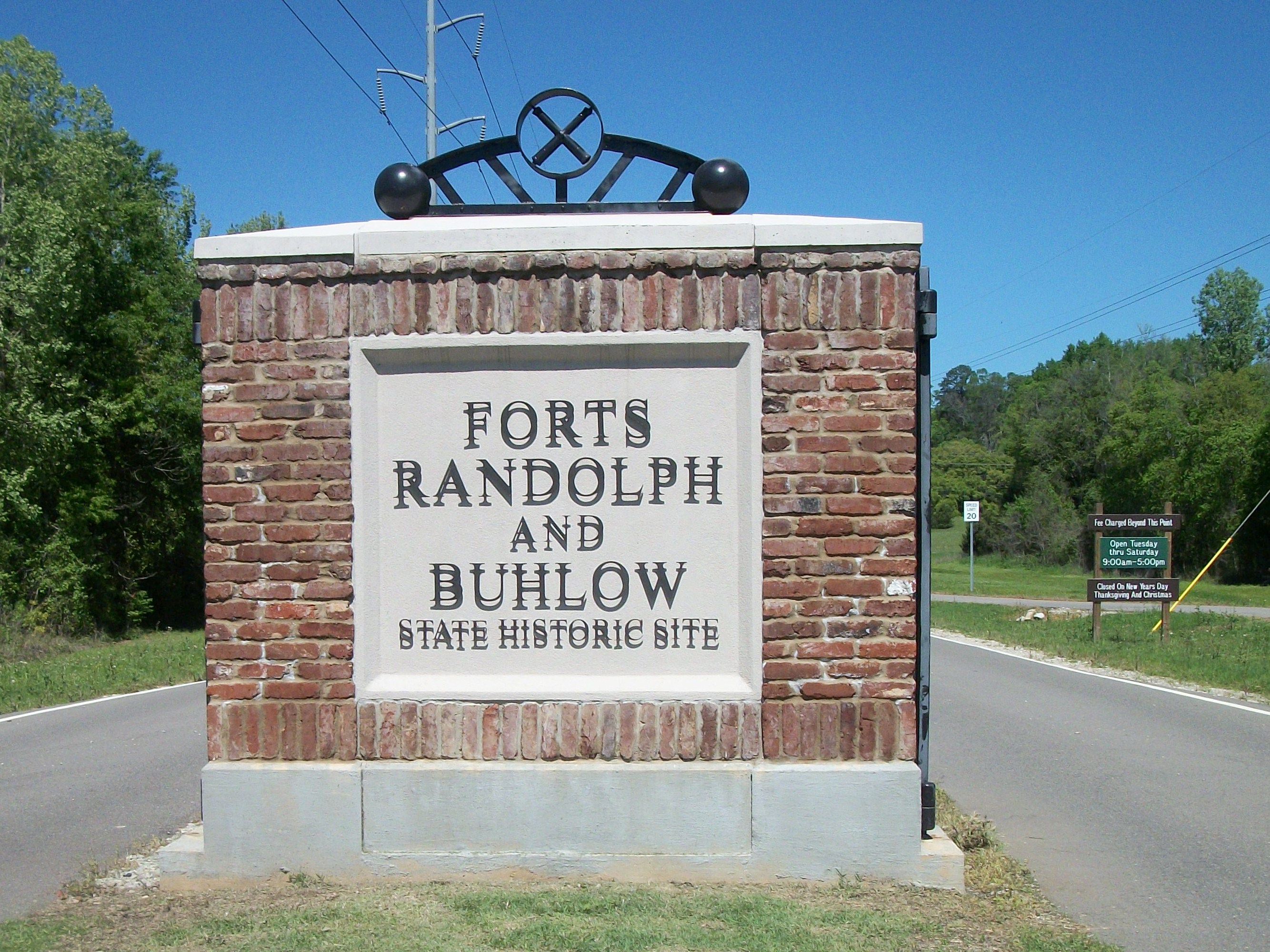
Forts Randolph and Buhlow State Historic Site Entrance

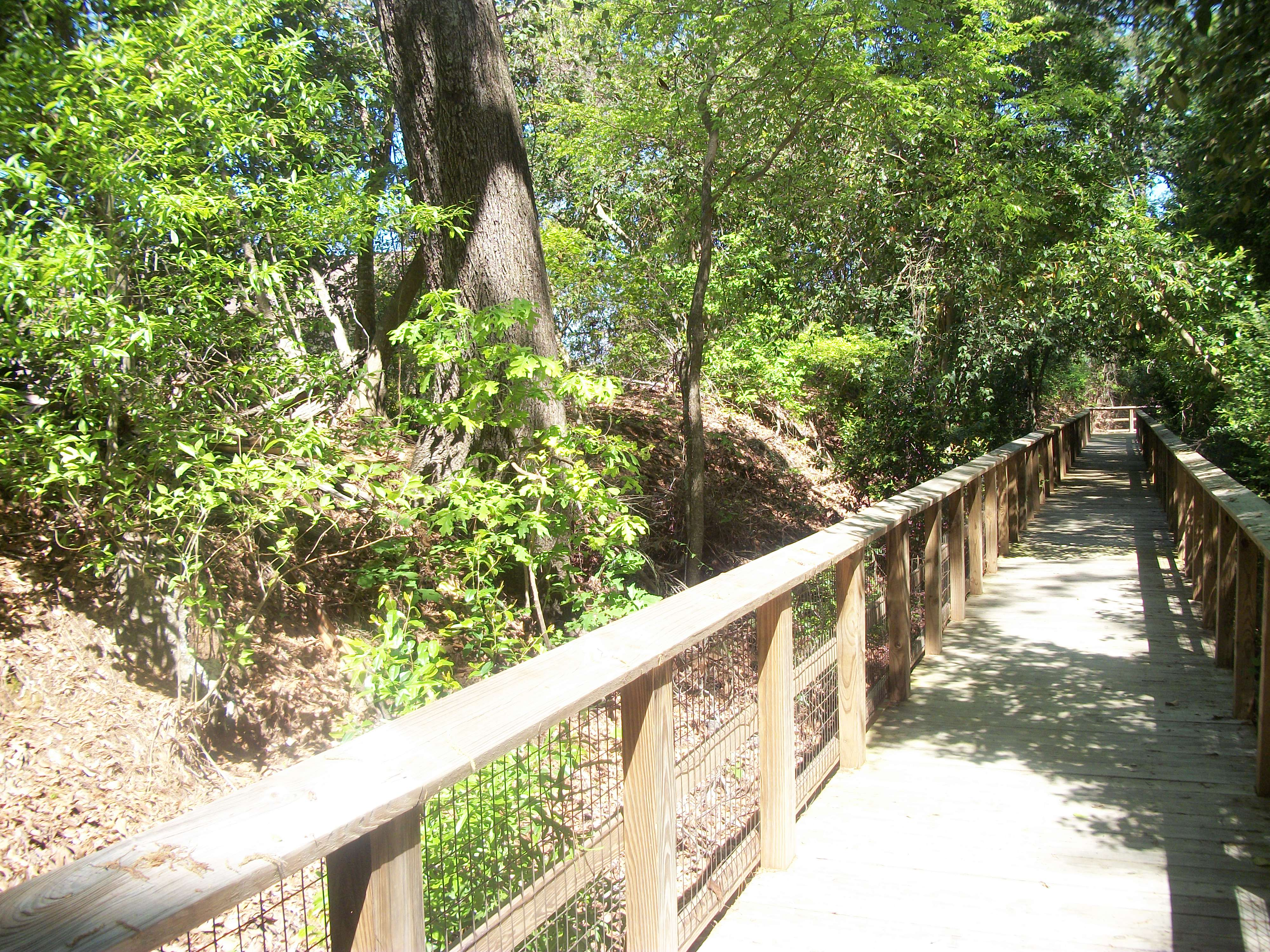
Interpertive Boardwalk

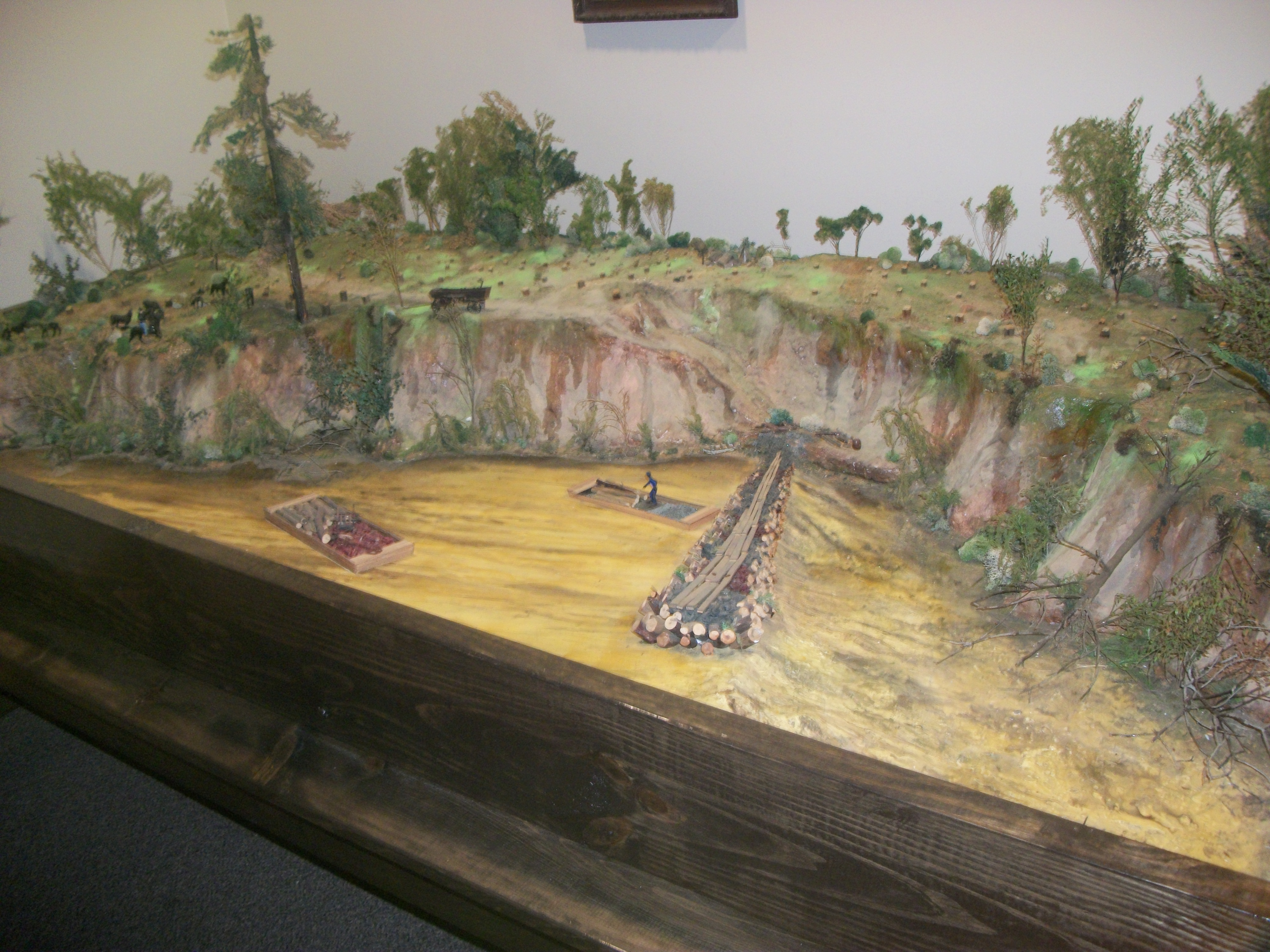
Model of Bailey's Dam

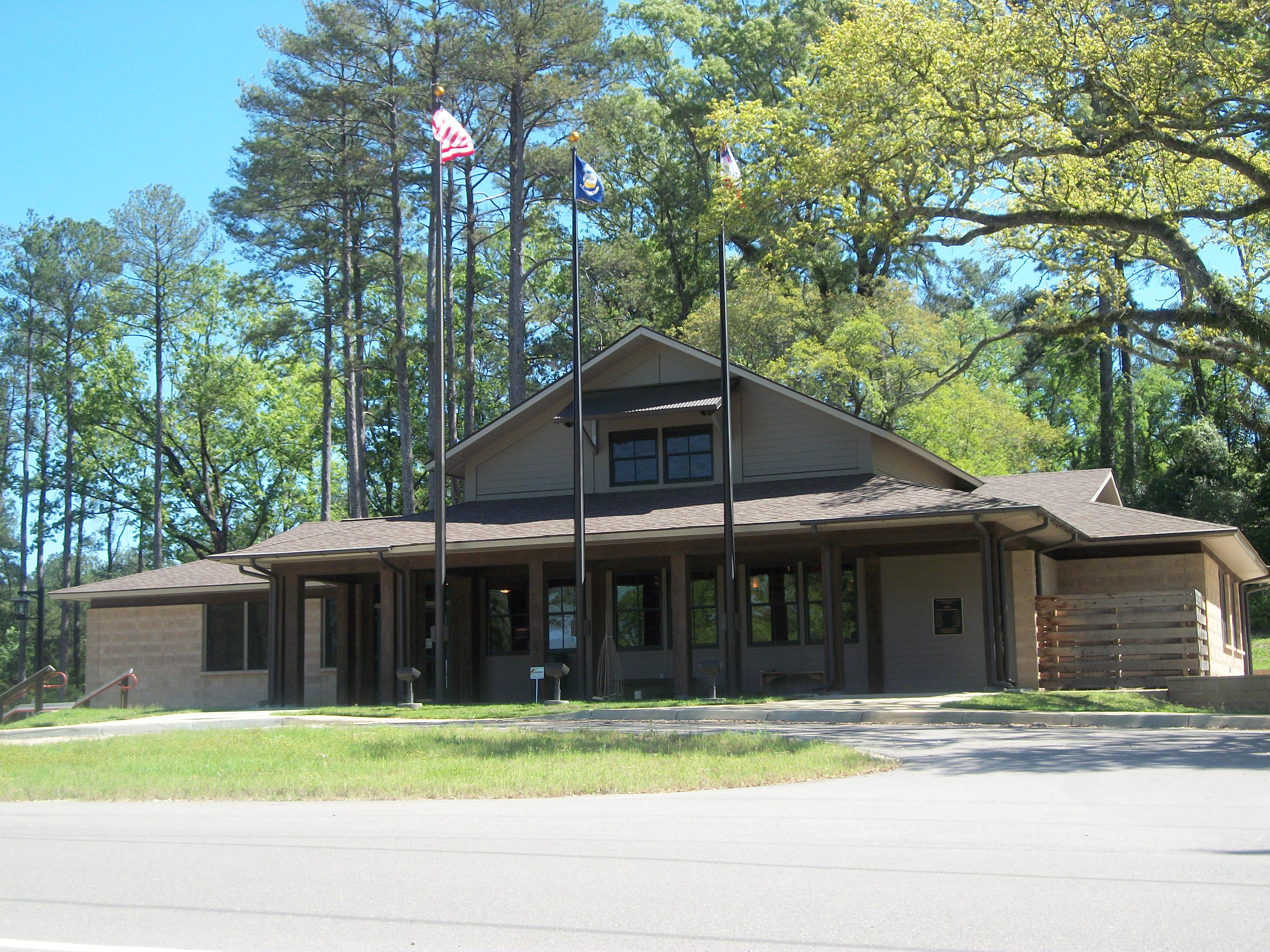
Visitor Center

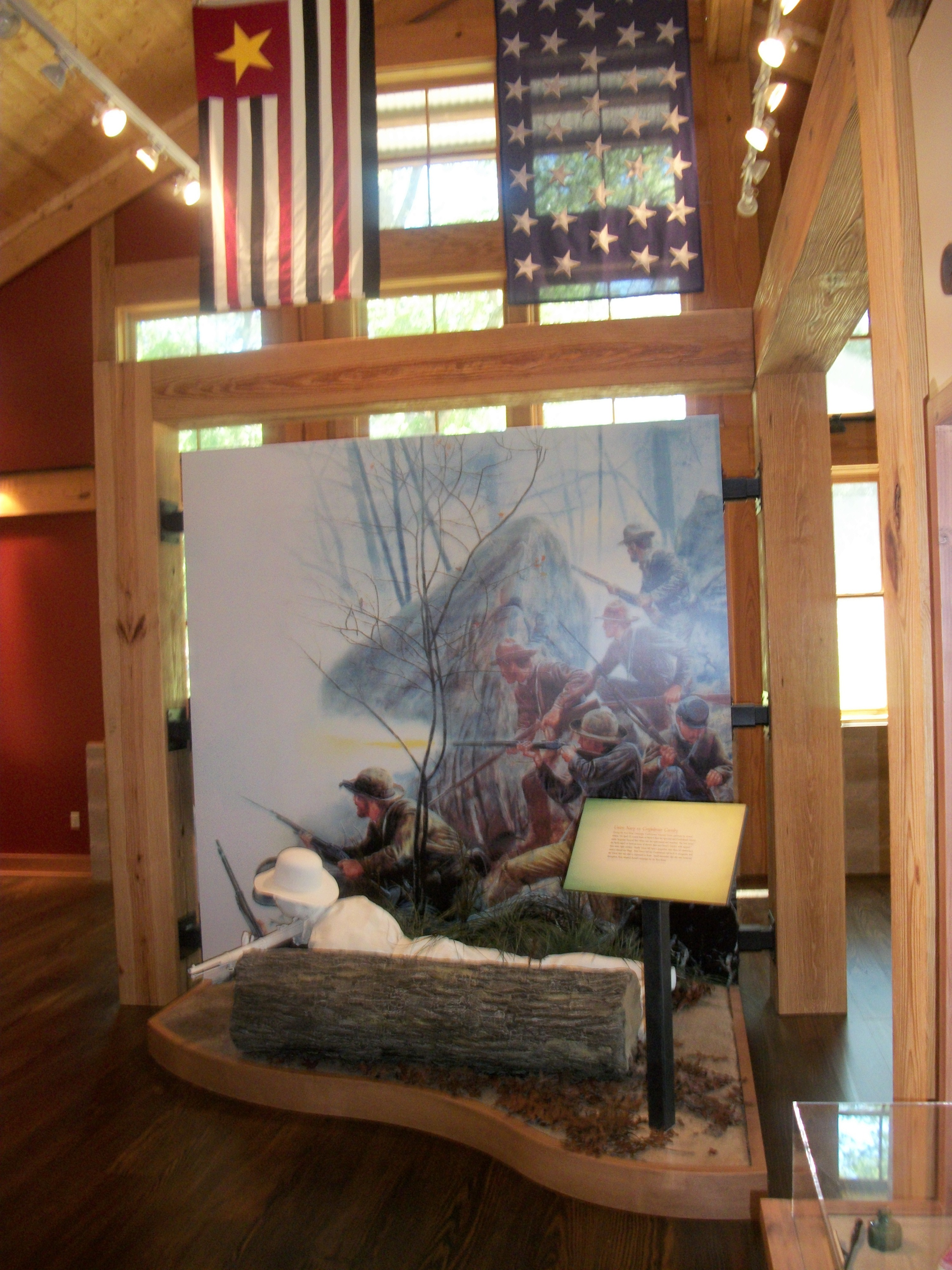
Interpretive Display

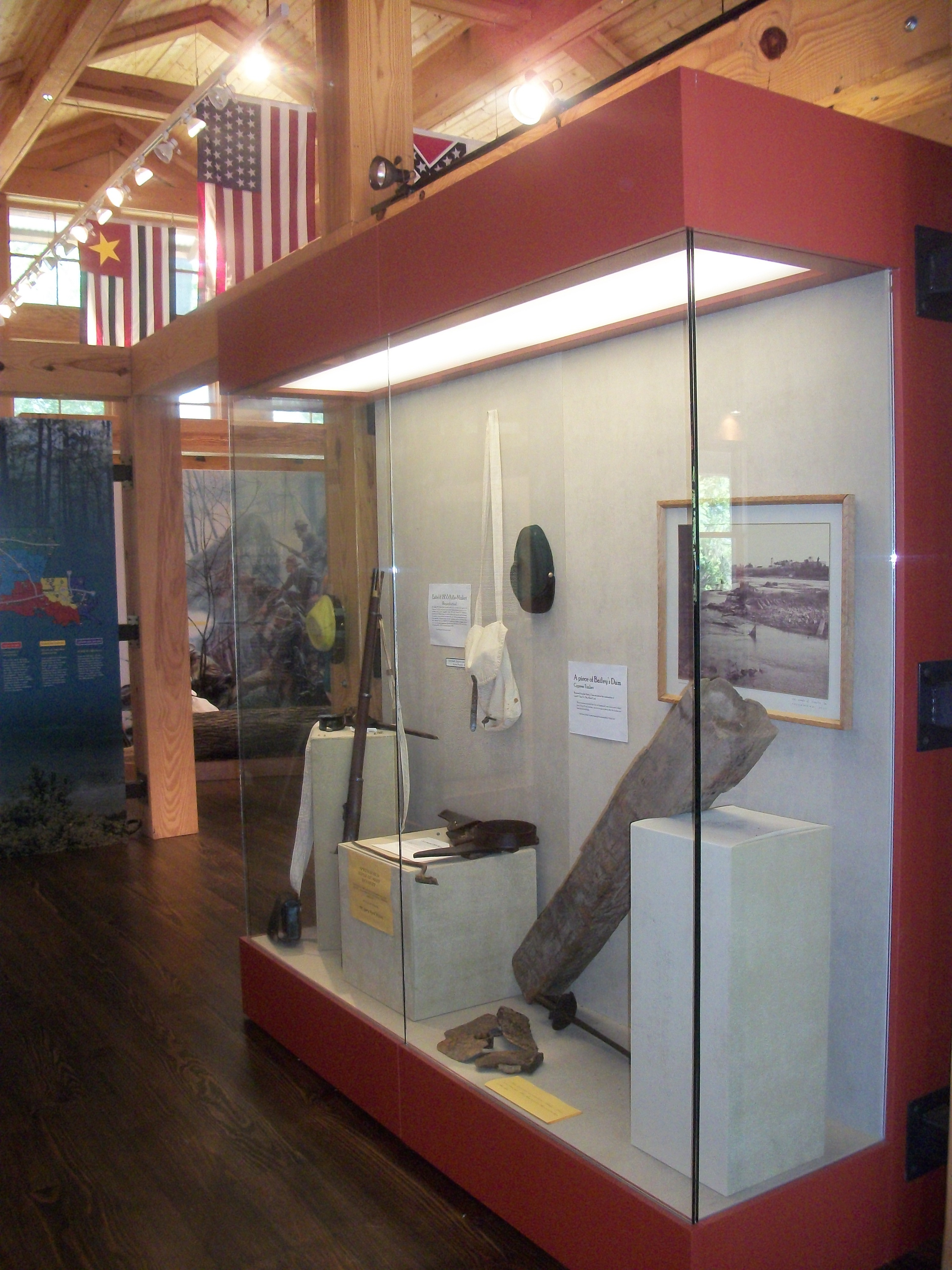
Interpretive Exhibit

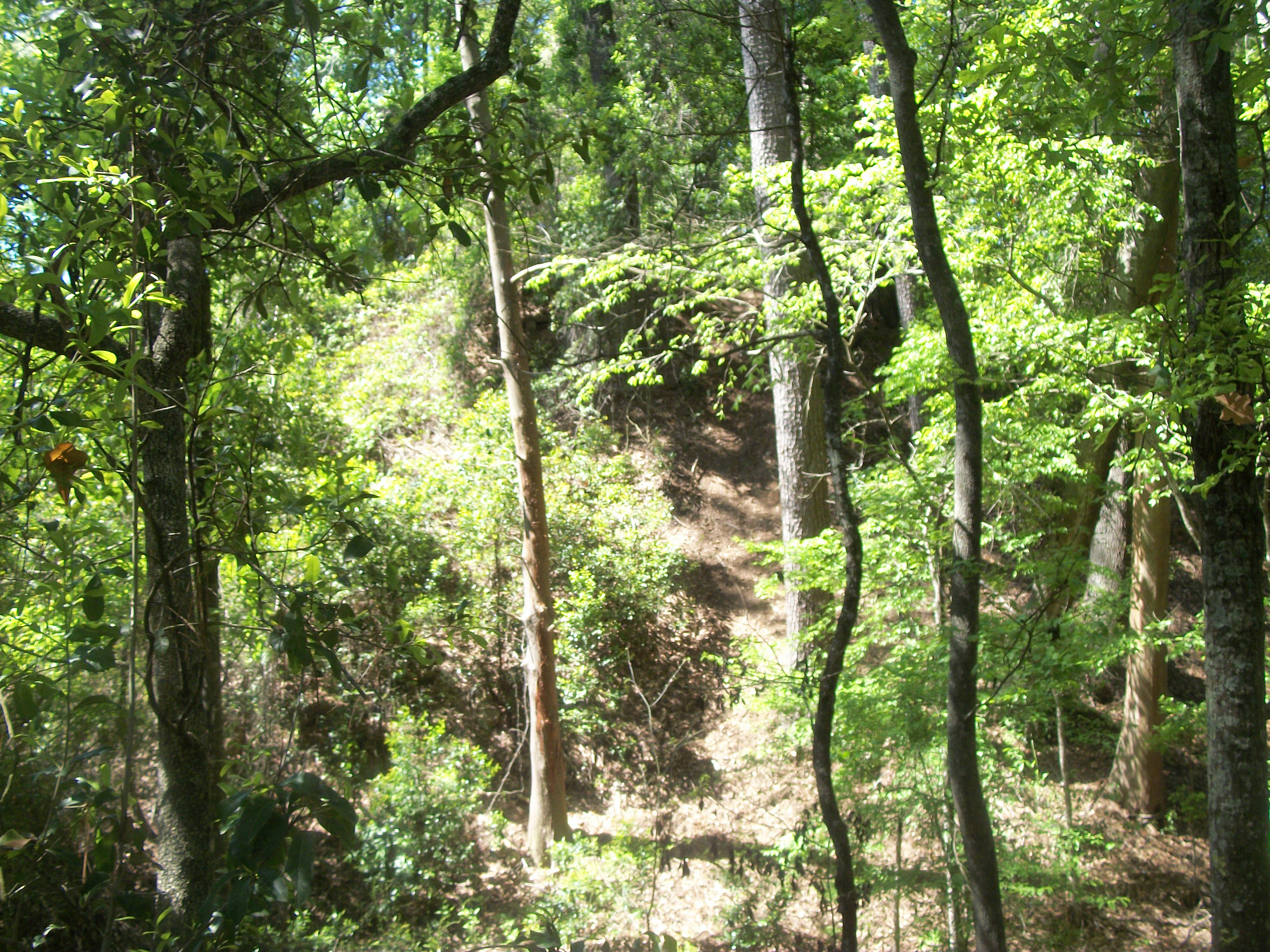
Earthen Citadel

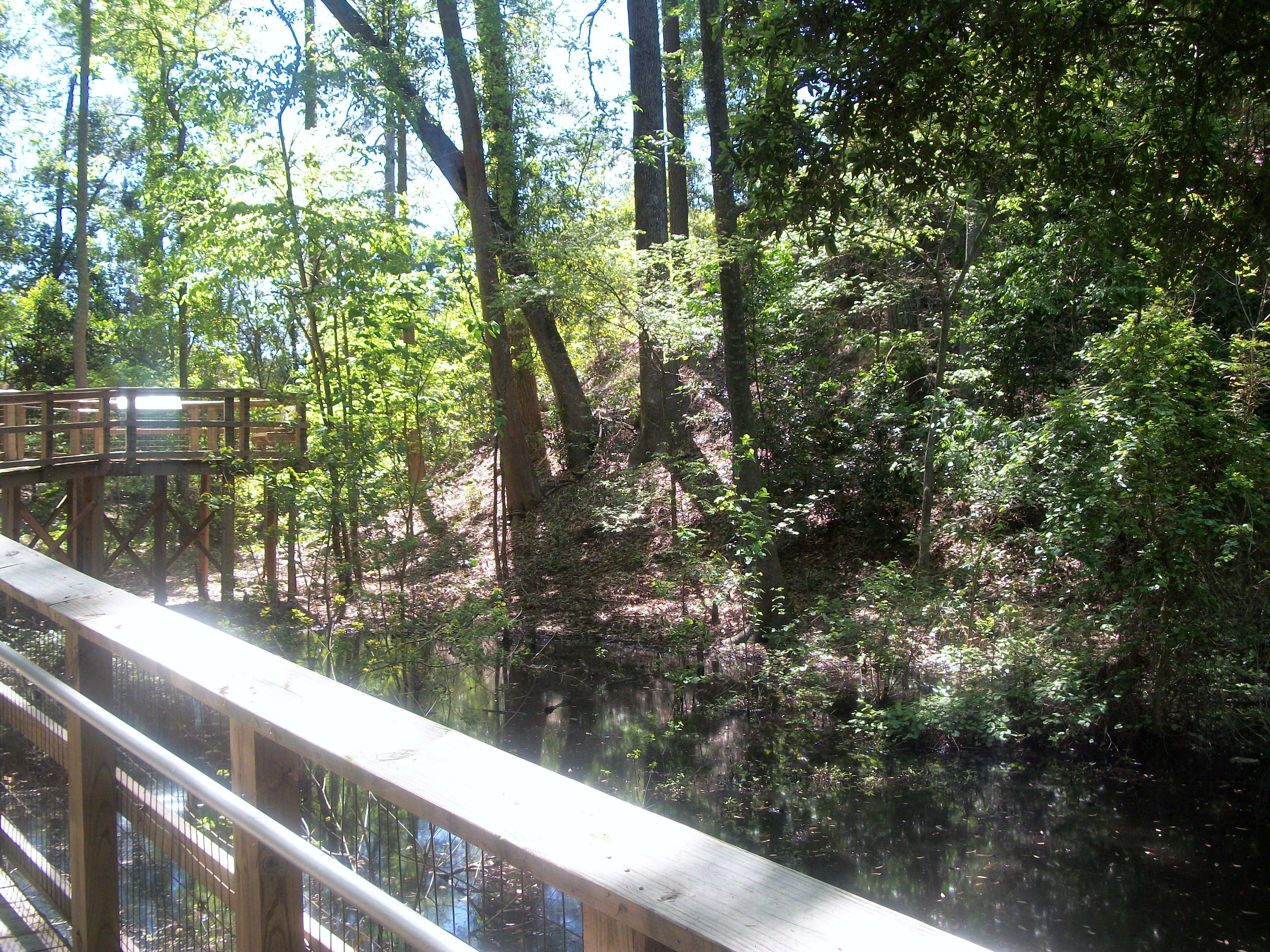
Citadel and Boardwalk

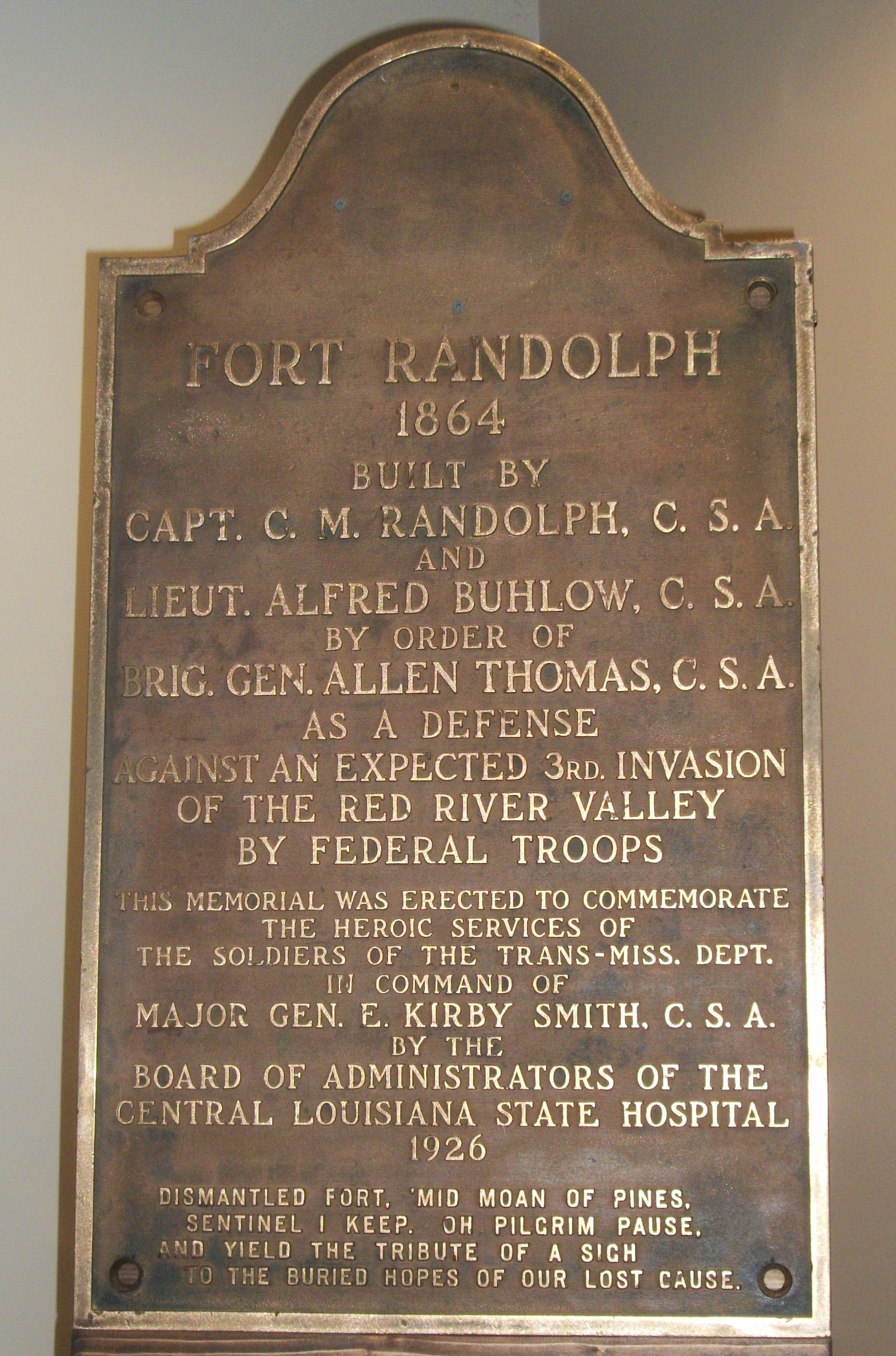
Bronze Plaque

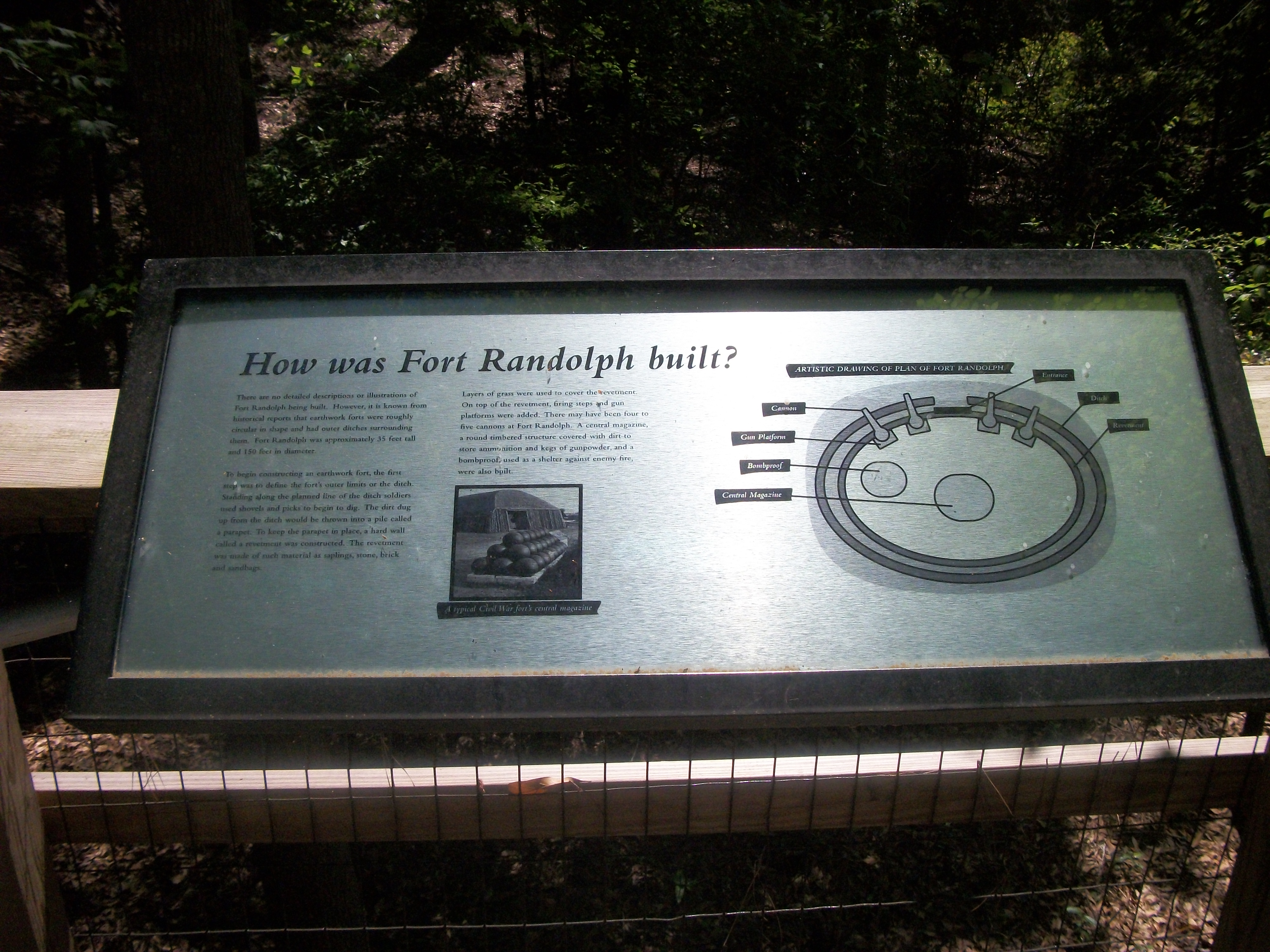
Boardwalk Interpertive Sign
