= Fort Buhlow =

- U.S. National Register of Historic Places
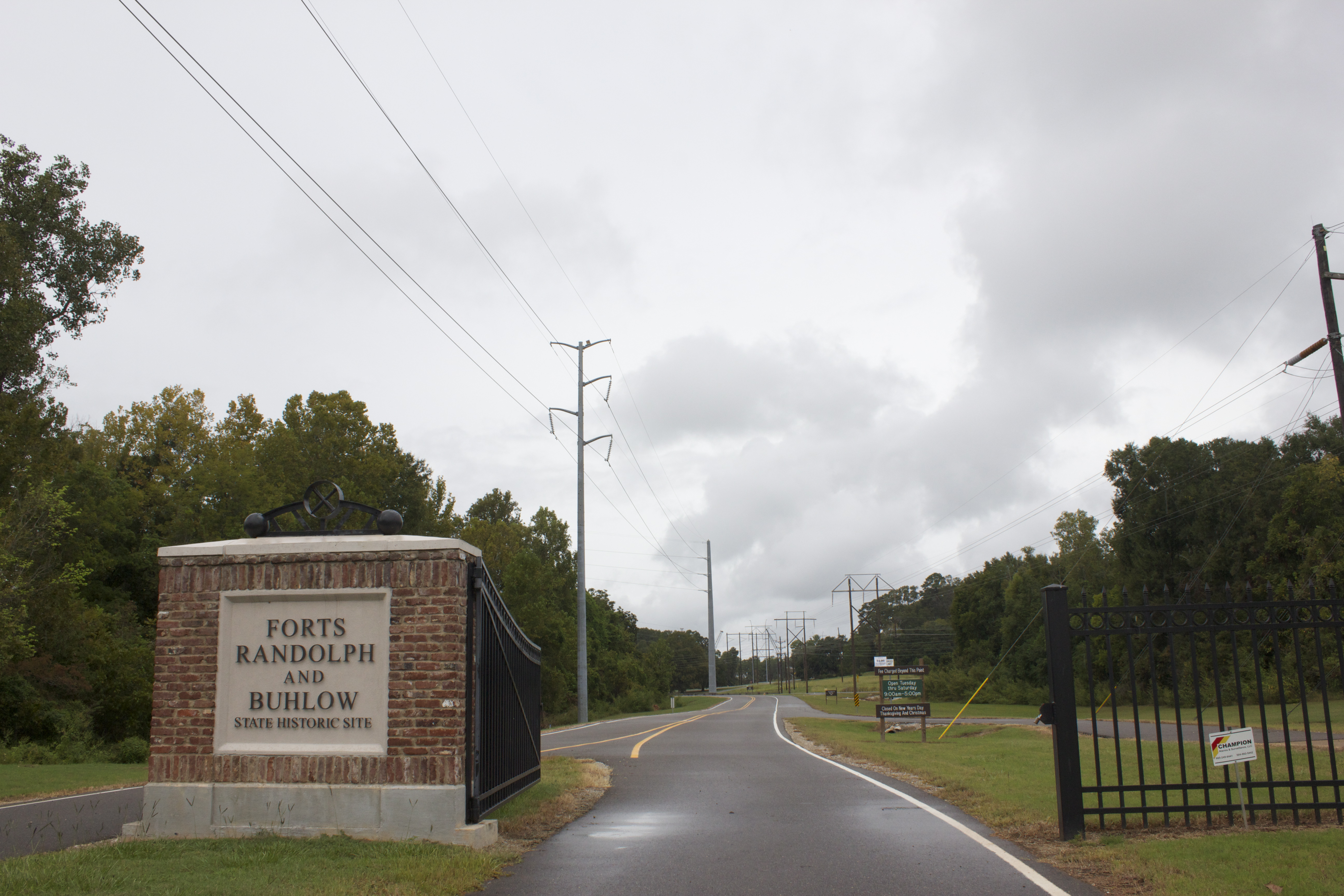
- Fort Randolph

- Location within Louisiana Location within the United States
- Location: Off U.S. 165, Pineville, Louisiana
- Coordinates: 31°19′7″N 92°26′56″W
- Area: 0.8 acres (0.32 ha)
- Built: 1864
- Engineer: Alphonse Buhlow
- NRHP reference No.: 81000299
- Added to NRHP: 1 June 1981

Fort Buhlow is an American Civil War fort site located in Pineville, Louisiana. It was added to the National Register of Historic Places on June 1, 1981. It was one of two forts built for the Confederate States Army by local plantation slave labor in March 1865 to prevent anticipated Union attacks. Alphonse Buhlow was the military engineer for the construction of the forts and this one was named for him.

== See also ==
- Forts Randolph and Buhlow State Historic Site
- National Register of Historic Places listings in Rapides Parish, Louisiana

== Gallery ==
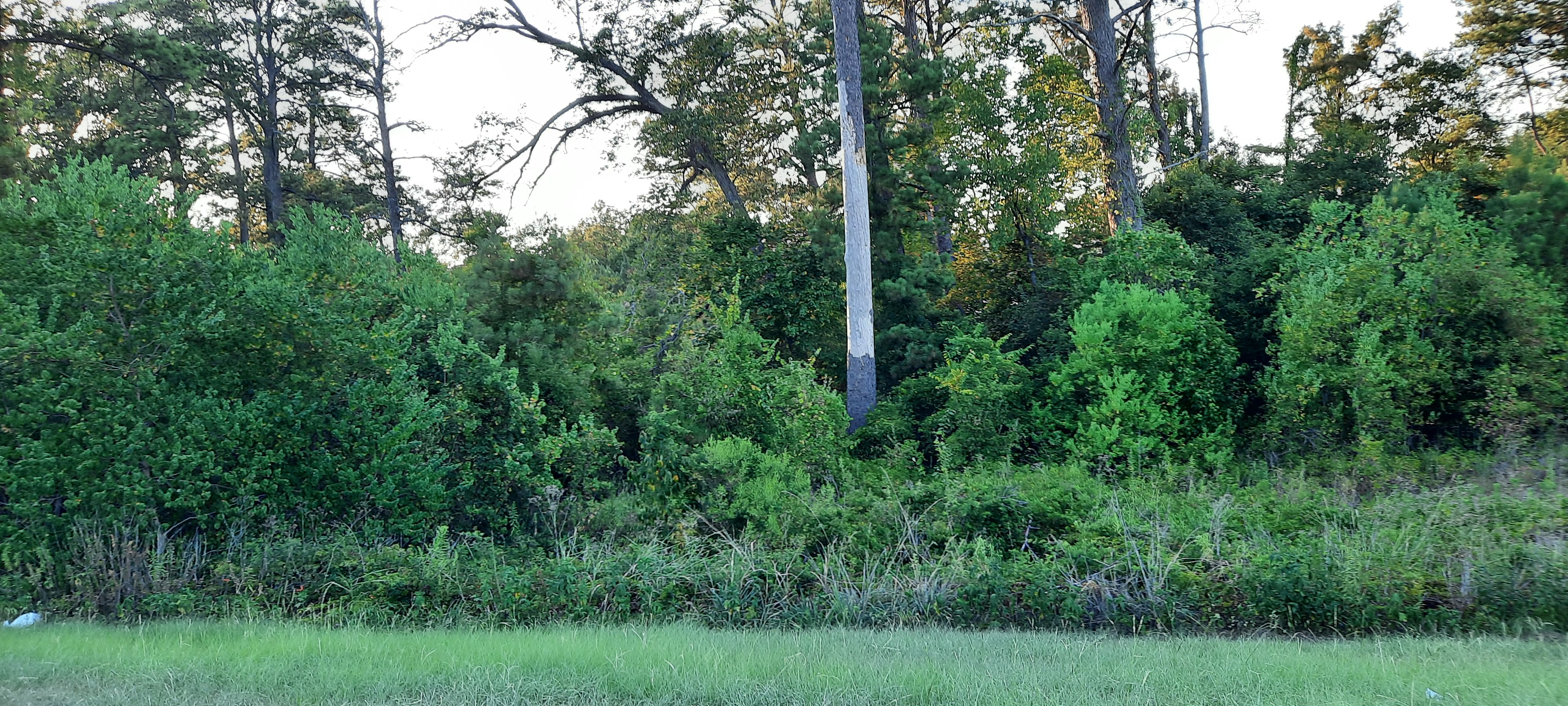
Location of Fort Buhlow, August 2023

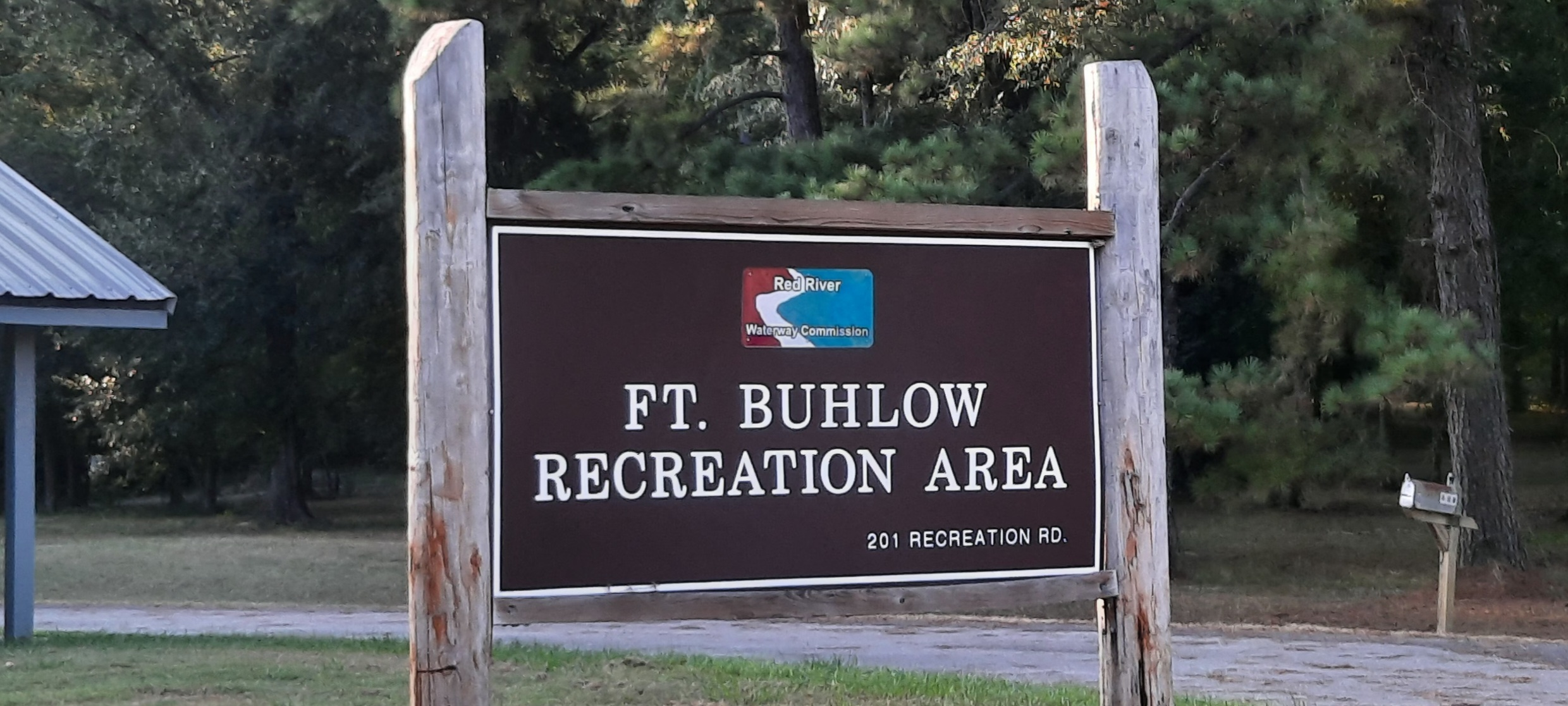
Fort Buhlow recreation area sign, August 2023
