= Carolina and Cumberland Gap Railway =

Railroad in the Southeastern United States

Overview
- Dates of operation: 1896–1898
- Successor: Southern Railway

Technical
- Track gauge: 4 ft 8 1/2 in (1,435 mm) standard gauge

The Carolina and Cumberland Gap Railway was a railroad in the Southeastern United States that existed in the late 19th century.

== Charter ==
The line was chartered by the South Carolina General Assembly in 1882, but was not built until 1896.

== Sale ==
It was acquired by the Southern Railway in June 1898.

== See also ==
- Atlantic and French Broad Valley Railroad
- Belton, Williamston and Easley Railroad
- Carolina, Cumberland Gap and Chicago Railway
- Edgefield Branch Railroad
- Edgefield, Trenton and Aiken Railroad
- French Broad and Atlantic Railway
