= Carolina, Cumberland Gap and Chicago Railway =

Railway in South Carolina

Overview
- Dates of operation: 1882–1895
- Successor: Carolina and Cumberland Gap Railway

Technical
- Track gauge: 4 ft 8 1/2 in (1,435 mm) standard gauge

The Carolina, Cumberland Gap and Chicago Railway was a late 19th-century railroad that served the Southeastern United States.

== Creation ==
The Carolina, Cumberland Gap and Chicago Railway was created in October 1882 when the French Broad and Atlantic Railway was consolidated with the Atlantic and French Broad Valley Railroad Company of North Carolina, the Morristown, Cumberland Gap and Ohio Railroad, the Morristown and Carolina Railroad, and the Cumberland Railway.

== Opening ==
As of 1889, the line was still far from matching its ambitious name, stretching from Aiken, South Carolina, to Edgefield, South Carolina, a distance of about 25 miles.

== Sale ==
In November 1891, a receiver was appointed for the Carolina, Cumberland Gap and Chicago Railway. The line was sold at foreclosure in October 1895, and the name changed to the Carolina and Cumberland Gap Railway. In 1898, the Carolina and Cumberland Gap was purchased by the Southern Railway.

== See also ==
- Atlantic and French Broad Valley Railroad
- Belton, Williamston and Easley Railroad
- Carolina and Cumberland Gap Railway
- Edgefield Branch Railroad
- Edgefield, Trenton and Aiken Railroad
- French Broad and Atlantic Railway
