= Atlantic and French Broad Valley Railroad =

Overview
- Dates of operation: 1878–1882
- Successor: French Broad and Atlantic Railway

Technical
- Track gauge: 4 ft 8 1/2 in (1,435 mm) standard gauge

The Atlantic and French Broad Valley Railroad was a railroad that served South Carolina in the period immediately following the Reconstruction Era of the United States.

== Creation ==
The Atlantic and French Broad Valley was created in 1878 by an act that changed the name of the Belton, Williamston and Easley Railroad. The Belton, Williamston and Easley was a railroad intended to serve the South Carolina Upstate region, specifically to connect Belton, South Carolina, and Easley, South Carolina. No such line was ever actually constructed.

== Consolidation ==
The Atlantic and French Broad River was consolidated with the Edgefield, Trenton and Aiken Railroad in 1882 to form the French Broad and Atlantic Railway.

== See also ==
- Belton, Williamston and Easley Railroad
- Carolina and Cumberland Gap Railway
- Carolina, Cumberland Gap and Chicago Railway
- Edgefield Branch Railroad
- Edgefield, Trenton and Aiken Railroad
- French Broad and Atlantic Railway
