= Belton, Williamston and Easley Railroad =

Carolinian railroad company

Overview
- Dates of operation: 1878–1879
- Successor: Atlantic and French Broad Valley Railroad

Technical
- Track gauge: 4 ft 8 1/2 in (1,435 mm) standard gauge

The Belton, Williamston and Easley Railroad was a Carolinian railroad company, chartered shortly after the end of the Reconstruction Era of the United States.

== Creation ==
The Belton, Williamston and Easley Railroad was created by an act of the South Carolina General Assembly in 1878.

== Name change ==
The following year (1879) its name was changed to the Atlantic and French Broad Valley Railroad Company of South Carolina.

== See also ==
- Atlantic and French Broad Valley Railroad
- Carolina and Cumberland Gap Railway
- Carolina, Cumberland Gap and Chicago Railway
- Edgefield Branch Railroad
- Edgefield, Trenton and Aiken Railroad
- French Broad and Atlantic Railway
