= Edgefield Branch Railroad =

Overview
- Dates of operation: 1878–1879
- Successor: Edgefield, Trenton and Aiken Railroad

Technical
- Track gauge: 4 ft 8 1/2 in (1,435 mm) standard gauge

The Edgefiled Branch Railroad was a South Carolina railroad that existed immediately after the Reconstruction Era of the United States.

== Charter ==
The Edgefield Branch Railroad was chartered in 1878 to build a line from Edgefield Court House, South Carolina, to extend to Trenton, South Carolina, where it would be able to connect with the Charlotte, Columbia and Augusta Railroad.

== Name change ==
A year later, the company's charter was amended in 1879 to change the line's name to the Edgefield, Trenton and Aiken Railroad.

== See also ==
- Atlantic and French Broad Valley Railroad
- Belton, Williamston and Easley Railroad
- Carolina and Cumberland Gap Railway
- Carolina, Cumberland Gap and Chicago Railway
- Edgefield, Trenton and Aiken Railroad
- French Broad and Atlantic Railway
