= Edgefield, Trenton and Aiken Railroad =

Overview
- Dates of operation: 1879–1882
- Successor: French Broad and Atlantic Railway

Technical
- Track gauge: 4 ft 8 1/2 in (1,435 mm) standard gauge

The Edgefield, Trenton and Aiken Railroad was a railroad that served South Carolina immediately after the end of the Reconstruction Era of the United States.

== Creation ==
In 1879, the charter of the Edgefield Branch Railroad was amended to change the line's name to the Edgefield, Trenton and Aiken Railroad Company. The Edgefield Branch Railroad was incorporated to build a railroad line between Edgefield Court House, South Carolina, to Trenton, South Carolina, where it could connect with the Charlotte, Columbia and Augusta Railroad.

== Route ==
- Edgefield
- Trenton, junction with Charlotte, Columbia and Augusta Railroad
- Aiken

== Merger ==
The Edgefield, Trenton and Aiken joined with the Atlantic and French Broad Valley Railroad in 1882 to form the French Broad and Atlantic Railway.

== See also ==
- Atlantic and French Broad Valley Railroad
- Belton, Williamston and Easley Railroad
- Carolina and Cumberland Gap Railway
- Carolina, Cumberland Gap and Chicago Railway
- Edgefield Branch Railroad
- French Broad and Atlantic Railway
