= Forts Randolph and Buhlow State Historic Site =

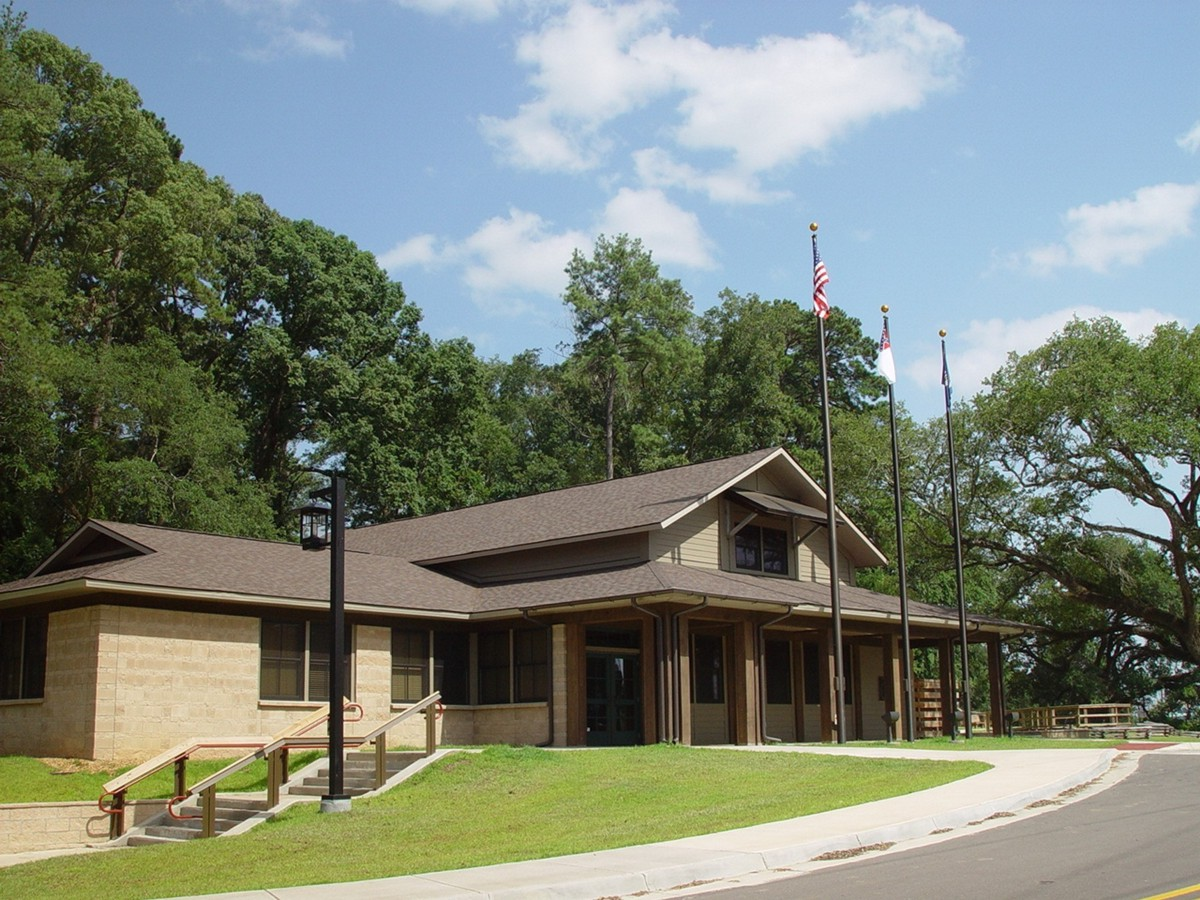
- Visitor center at the historic site

- Location within Louisiana
- Location: Rapides Parish, Louisiana, United States of America
- Coordinates: 31.324172°N 92.449203°W
- Established: November 18, 2010
- Governing body: Louisiana Office of State Parks

Forts Randolph and Buhlow State Historic Site in Pineville, Louisiana, a state historic site in Louisiana consisting of Fort Randolph and Fort Buhlow. Both of these forts are in the National Register of Historic Places.

== Attractions ==
Forts Randolph and Buhlow State Historic Site includes the remains of Bailey's Dam. This dam allowed for the Union Fleet, under the command of Admiral David Porter, to escape below the rapids on the Red River during the Union retreat after the Battle of Mansfield. The site also includes a visitor center, an elevated boardwalk, and a field for Civil War re-enactments.
