= Tennessee Railroad =

Defunct American railroad

The Tennessee Railroad (reporting mark TENN) was a short line standard gauge (4 ft 8 1/2in) common carrier railroad running from Oneida, Tennessee to Fork Mountain, Tennessee. Reorganized in 1973 by the Southern Railway as the Tennessee Railway, it remains a subsidiary of Norfolk Southern.

Sold at foreclosure on Valentine’s Day in 1918, the Tennessee Railway never was a financial powerhouse. In 1957, the railroad retired its last steam locomotive. In 1959, the first petition for abandonment was filed, but the coal business picked up and it was withdrawn. In 1973, with the railroad in receivership, the line became part of the Southern Railway. In the years following, Southern upgraded the line with new ties and rail, daylighted the tunnel near Oneida, and streamlined operations to make the line an important feeder for coal traffic.

As environmental regulations became stricter, and large low-sulfur coal reserves were discovered in Wyoming’s Powder River Basin, coal mining operations in the area began to play out. By 2005, it appeared the Tennessee was again doomed when Southern Railway successor Norfolk Southern filed to abandon the line, but thanks to National Coal Corporation, the line was purchased with hopes that the coal mining industry would once again use this route. National Coal originally selected Watco to manage and operate the line, but only one train ran in 2006. Since then the line has been run by R.J. Corman. In 2008, a company known as the New River Railway began operating passenger excursion trains over various parts of the line. By 2010, the New River Railway was shut down due to colliding with a hy-rail vehicle, and in 2013, the last train ran due to the Baldwin Prep Plant shutting down due to Environmental Violations. In 2023, R.J. Corman started the process to abandon the line, which was met with resistance by a group to save the railroad. Currently, a sale of the railroad for tourist/motorcar use is being discussed by the group and R.J. Corman.

In 1991, American country music band The Desert Rose Band filmed part of their music video for the single "You Can Go Home" at the Tennessee Railroad Museum.
