= West Tennessee Railroad =

Railway line in the United States of America

Overview
- Headquarters: Jackson, Tennessee
- Reporting mark: WTNN
- Locale: West Tennessee
- Dates of operation: 1984–

Technical
- Track gauge: 4 ft 8 1/2 in (1,435 mm) standard gauge

The West Tennessee Railroad (reporting mark WTNN) is a shortline railroad in the Southern U.S., connecting Corinth, Mississippi, to Fulton, Kentucky, via western Tennessee. The company began operating in 1984 on a portion of the former Mobile and Ohio Railroad (M&O) main line located entirely within Tennessee, between Jackson and Kenton. It significantly expanded operations in 2001 through the lease, from the Norfolk Southern Railway, of the ex-M&O south to Corinth and a former main line of the Illinois Central Railroad (IC) north to Fulton, as well as a branch from Jackson to Poplar Corner in southeastern Crockett County (ex-Birmingham and Northwestern Railway, acquired by the Gulf, Mobile and Northern Railroad in 1924). All of these lines were part of the Illinois Central Gulf Railroad (ICG) prior to its 1980s program of spin-offs, during which Gibson County purchased the Jackson–Kenton line and the Southern Railway acquired the Corinth–Fulton line and Poplar Corner branch.

The company is under common control with the South Central Tennessee Railroad and the Tennken Railroad. Its main line was upgraded as part of the MidAmerica Corridor, an initiative by the Canadian National Railway and Norfolk Southern Railway to improve rail service between Illinois and the Southeast.

== History and current operations ==
The Mobile and Ohio Railroad completed a line between Mobile, Alabama, and Columbus, Kentucky, in 1861, and the Mississippi Central Railroad, an Illinois Central Railroad predecessor, completed its north–south line between New Orleans, Louisiana and Cairo, Illinois in 1873. The Birmingham and Northwestern Railway opened a line between Jackson, where the M&O and IC lines crossed, and Dyersburg, Tennessee, in 1912 and was purchased by the Gulf, Mobile and Northern Railroad in 1924. Through mergers, all of these lines became part of the Illinois Central Gulf Railroad in 1972.

The Gibson County Railroad Authority acquired the line between Jackson and Kenton in August 1984, and the new West Tennessee Railroad began operations in October that same year. The Southern Railway bought the Corinth–Jackson–Fulton and Jackson–Poplar Corner lines from the ICG in June 1988, and in August 2001 the Norfolk Southern Railway, successor to the Southern, leased them to WTNN. (The Southern also acquired the ICG's line southeast to Haleyville, Alabama, and trackage rights from Fulton north to Centralia, Illinois, and NS sold the former, where not abandoned, to the Redmont Railway in 1995.)
