= Knoxville, Cumberland Gap and Louisville Railroad =

Knoxville, Cumberland Gap and Louisville Railroad (1888–1889) was a railroad which went across the U.S. state of Tennessee and into Kentucky. It was built in the late 1880s and used for industrial purposes.

The railroad began as the Powell's Valley Railway, chartered in Tennessee July 24, 1896, to build a railroad line from Knoxville, Tennessee to Cumberland Gap, Tennessee. In 1887 the name was changed to the Powell's Valley Railroad.

In 1889 the Powell's Valley Railroad again changed its name, to the Knoxville, Cumberland Gap & Louisville Railroad. Soon after, in 1889, the KCG&L completed construction on its line between Middlesborough, Tennessee and Cumberland Gap, including a tunnel under Cumberland Gap. Because the tunnel was built where Kentucky, Tennessee and Virginia came together, charters from all three states were needed. After five years, the tunnel collapsed and was repaired but collapsed again in 1896. At one time, passengers had to get out and walk or ride a wagon across the gap while the train went through the tunnel.

In 1895, the Knoxville, Cumberland Gap and Louisville Railroad was sold and reorganized as the Knoxville, Cumberland Gap and Louisville Railway.

In 1896, the Louisville and Nashville Railroad took possession of the KCG&LRY and abandoned much of its trackage. Later that same year, the L&N acquired the Middlesborough Railroad in order to provide a company to lease certain property to the KCG&LRY, specifically much of the remaining trackage from the L&N connection with the KCG&L in Tennessee to the station in Middlesborough, a total of 4.342 miles, for 99 years. The L&N bought and reinforced the tunnel and built a line from Pineville, Kentucky southeast to Middlesborough. Southern Railway bought the portion of the line south of the tunnel.

In 1971, the Atlantic Coast Line acquired the L&N.

In 1986, the Seaboard Coast Line, owner of the ACL, merged with the Chessie System to form CSX Transportation. Later the NS acquired this route. However, in early 2022 R.J. Corman announced that its Knoxville and Cumberland Gap Railroad would acquire and operate this route.
