= Belt Railway of Chattanooga =

The Belt Railway of Chattanooga is a historic railroad in the United States. The railway was originally organized from the Union Railway Company and Chattanooga Union Railway in 1895, but was reorganized later that year by the Alabama Great Southern Railroad. The BRC operated about 45 miles (72 km) of track in and around Chattanooga, Tennessee. The railroad started near Warner Park and made its way several miles past the East Tennessee, Virginia line ending at Boyce Station.

It was controlled by the Alabama Great Southern Railroad, and its property was conveyed to that company in 1946. The Belt Railway of Chattanooga was operated physically as well as financially by the Alabama Great Southern Railroad. In regards to finances, collections were entrusted to the credit of Charles Patten. These collections were made by a local agent and deposited in the First National Bank of Chattanooga. The engines used on the railway included numbers 104, 106, 141, 150, and 156. These engines sole purpose was to facilitate the Alabama Great Southern business. An industry called the Montague Company originated on the belt tracks at Chattanooga, and consigned the loads of many of the cars that transported clay. The Belt Line continued in service after it was acquired by Southern Railway, but it ran for only a few years in the late 1880s and the early 1890s. Today, the only visible tracks still in place can be seen at the start of the line at EPB yards across from Warner Park and a small section near Bachman Street. The Tennessee Valley Railroad Museum still uses the at-grade route of the East Tennessee line as a moving museum.
