= Paducah, Tennessee and Alabama Railroad =

The Paducah, Tennessee and Alabama Railroad was formed in July 1889 by the merger of the decades-old Paducah and Tennessee Railroad Company of Kentucky, with the newly established Paducah and Tennessee Railway and Paducah and Tennessee Railroad Companies of Tennessee. Construction began in 1890 at Paducah, Kentucky, and the road was completed to Lexington, Tennessee, in November 1892, totaling 118.61 miles (190.88 km) of track.

Directors were listed as John T. Davis, Thomas H. West, William L. Huse, Alvah Mansur, Daniel Catlin, John A. Scudder, T. J. Moss, and J. H. Allen, all of St. Louis, Missouri; John Overton Jr. of Memphis, Tennessee; A. B. Lamb of Paris, Tennessee; T. H. Puryear of Paducah, Kentucky; and E. B. Johnson of St. Elmo, Illinois.

Officers were listed as T. J. Moss, President; Thomas H. West, First Vice-President and Chairman of the Board; T. H. Puryear, Second Vice-President; J. W. Harrison of St. Louis, Missouri, Treasurer; Benjamin Wilson of Memphis, Tennessee, General Manager; J. W. Fristoe of Paducah, Kentucky, Secretary; and A. R. Meyers of Paducah, Kentucky, Auditor.

The rolling stock was listed as 11 locomotive engines, four passenger cars, two baggage cars, 175 box cars, 45 flat cars, ten stock cars, 35 coal cars, two cabooses, and ten other cars. Of these 283 total cars, 266 were paid off as of December 31, 1892.

The Tennessee Midland Railroad, whose lines ran from Memphis through Jackson to Perryville, was sold on April 2, 1892, to T. J. Moss, the principal owner of the Paducah, Tennessee and Alabama Railroad. Both lines went into receivership, operated by W. L. Huse and John Overton Jr. from November 1, 1893, to December 14, 1895. On that date, they were sold at foreclosure to Louisville and Nashville Railroad and then leased to the Nashville, Chattanooga and St. Louis Railway for a term of 99 years.
