= Red River Railroad =

Overview
- Headquarters: Alexandria, LA
- Locale: Louisiana
- Dates of operation: 1837–1881
- Successor: New Orleans Pacific Railway

Technical
- Track gauge: 5 ft (1,524 mm)

The Red River Railroad, also known as the Ralph Smith Smith Railroad and the Alexandria and Cheneyville Railroad, was the first railroad in the United States built west of the Mississippi River.

An area engineer, planter and steamboat operator, Ralph Smith Smith, developed 16 miles (26 km) of 5 ft (1,524 mm) gauge railroad line to connect Smith's Landing at Lecompte, Louisiana to the docks at Alexandria, Louisiana, enabling area settlers to have greater opportunity to get their crops to market. Although slow and crudely built, the train was capable of making one round trip daily. Smith Smith also owned three steam boats with which he transported cotton brought to Alexandria on the railroad to New Orleans.

When completed, the line of railroad extended approximately 40 miles (64 km) between Alexandria, Louisiana and Bayou Hauffpaur near Cheneyville, Louisiana. The railroad transported sugar cane and cotton in connection with steamboats on the Red River.

The railroad operated for over twenty years. It was destroyed in 1864 during the Red River Campaign of the American Civil War when Union soldiers used rails, cross ties, bridge timbers, and rolling stock from the railroad as material to dump into the Red River in the construction of Bailey's Dam. The car house in Alexandria was burned when the town was destroyed by retreating Union forces on May 13, 1864.

In 1881, the railroad was sold to the New Orleans Pacific Railway Company.
