= Tennessee Southern Railroad =

Overview
- Headquarters: Mount Pleasant, Tennessee
- Reporting mark: TSRR
- Locale: middle Tennessee and northwestern Alabama
- Dates of operation: 1988–present

Technical
- Track gauge: 4 ft 8 1/2 in (1,435 mm) standard gauge
- Length: 149 miles (240 km)

Other
- Website: Official website

The Tennessee Southern Railroad (reporting mark TSRR) began operations in 1988 and currently operates in middle Tennessee and northwestern Alabama. The main line consists of 118 miles (190 km) and the total track has 149 miles (240 km). TSRR is owned by Patriot Rail Corporation. Commodities the TSRR handles include scrap iron, coal, coke, woodpulp, pulpboard, sand, chemicals, steel, aluminum, and fertilizer raw materials. In 2007, in response to increasing traffic, the TSRR purchased eight diesel locomotives with greater power and fuel efficiency than its existing fleet of ten.
