= Bailey's Dam =

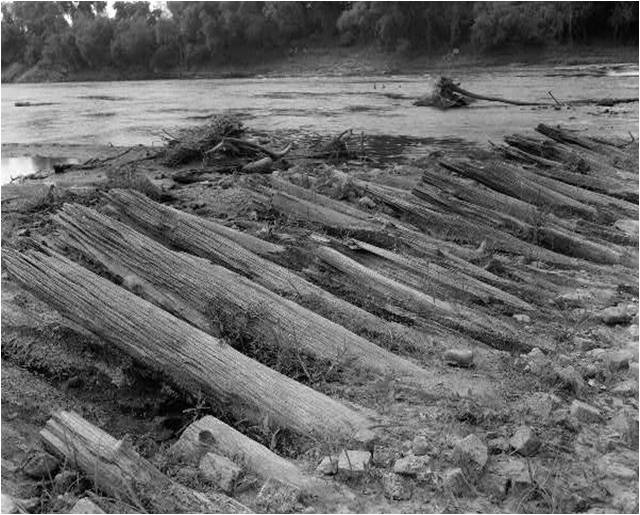
- Remnants of Bailey's Dam in 1984
- Interactive map of Bailey's Dam
- Location: Alexandria / Pineville, Louisiana
- Construction began: April 28, 1864
- Opening date: May 8, 1864
- Demolition date: May 13, 1864

Dam and spillways
- Type of dam: Rock-crib
- Impounds: Red River
- Height: ~7 ft.
- Length: ~758 ft.
- Bailey's Dam Site
- U.S. National Register of Historic Places
- Location within Louisiana Location within the United States
- Location: Red River S of U.S. 71, Alexandria, Louisiana
- Coordinates: 31°19′32″N 92°27′7″W
- Area: 8 acres (3.2 ha)
- Built: 1864
- NRHP reference No.: 76000973
- Added to NRHP: June 29, 1976

Bailey's Dam was a timber dam on the Red River in Alexandria, Louisiana. It was built in 1864 during the Red River Campaign in the American Civil War. It was planned by Lieutenant Colonel Joseph Bailey to afford passage over the Alexandria rapids for part of Rear Admiral David Dixon Porter's Mississippi River Squadron. The dam successfully raised the level of the river and was then breached in order to allow the boats in its reservoir to pass downstream.

== Background ==
The Red River was an important transportation corridor through Louisiana, where the river channel meandered through alluvium. A short distance upstream of Alexandria, the river crosses two ledges of sandstone and siltstone. The depth of water over these bedrock ledges was less than the channel depth through nearby alluvium, and the downstream ledge controlled the water level upstream of that ledge.

During the Red River Campaign in March 1864, General Nathaniel P. Banks and his Union troops moved north along the Red River in order to capture Shreveport. Accompanying them was Rear Admiral David D. Porter who was in command of the Mississippi River Squadron. The levels of the river were unseasonably low, perhaps due to a multi-year drought, and made passage for the boats difficult when they reached the Alexandria falls. Porter could only move 12 gunboats and 20 transports north of the falls after waiting for the level to become high enough. The rest of the fleet would wait behind. After being defeated by Confederate General Richard Taylor and failing to capture Shreveport in the Battle of Mansfield on April 8, General Banks and the Union troops were now retreating back south along the Red River. Taylor's troops were in pursuit of them and harassing them with gunfire. Porter's flotilla managed to navigate the river but with difficulty. By April 28, the flotilla reached the Alexandria falls, although the river was too low at 3 feet and 4 inches. Porter's boats lightened their loads but needed 7 feet of water to pass. They did not have time to wait for the river level to rise. The chief engineer of the 19th Corps, Lieutenant Colonel Joseph Bailey, suggested that a wing dam should be built in order to raise the river level and free the boats. Bailey had constructed dams in Wisconsin as a lumberman and was familiar with how one could solve the problem. Although other officers criticized Bailey for the idea, General Banks agreed to it and ordered the construction.

== Construction ==
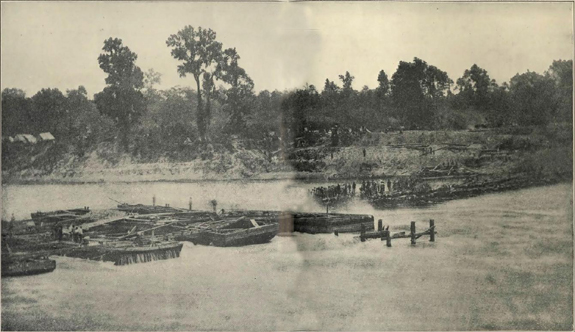
Bailey's Dam under construction, May 1864

Construction soon began supervised by Bailey. Around 3,000 soldiers started to fell trees and bring rock, brick, stone and other materials to the construction site. As construction progressed, two wings of the dam developed from either shore of the 758-foot-wide (231 m) river. The dam was at the bottom of the downstream ledge and was built with local materials. Where trees were plentiful on the left (east) side of the river, men with logging experience from the 29th Maine Volunteer Infantry Regiment used those trees for dam-building. Freed slaves of the 97th and 99th United States Colored Infantry Regiments worked from the right bank building box cribs filled with rocks and stones. The dam was built with 4 x 10 inch wooden timbers that were stacked parallel with the river. The upstream tops of the timbers were anchored with stone while their trunks were raised higher by timbers that were perpendicular to the river. This helped support the dam and make it stronger as a reservoir filled in behind. The rock-crib structure did not cross the entire river and four coal barges were sunk in between the dam's 150-foot (46 m) gap. The barges were filled with local material and anchored into the riverbed. Bailey directed that one of the barges only be partially filled as he planned to quickly remove it in order to allow the reservoir to empty and the flotilla to pass.

Among the materials used were that of the Red River Railroad.

== Historical significance ==
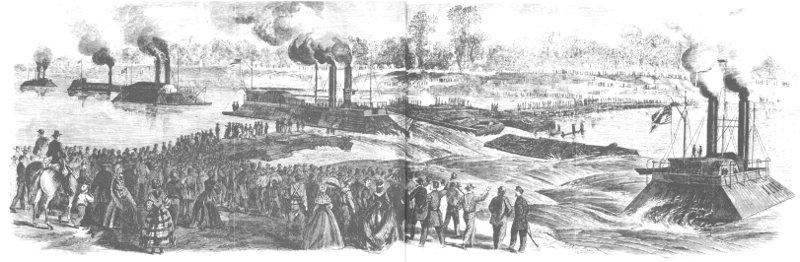
Contemporary engraving of the vessels riding through the dam

By May 6, the dam had raised the river level to four feet and by May 8, it was over five feet, allowing some of the smaller boats to pass in directly behind the dam. At 5:30 AM on May 9, two of the barges surprisingly broke loose, sending a gush of water downstream. Only four of Porter's ships including the Lexington passed through as the rest were unprepared. Bailey now needed to repair the dam but also decided to build two smaller dams upstream as well. These two winged dams were complete on May 11 and would channel the water downstream into a deeper course but also relieve pressure on the downstream dam. On May 13, with the dam repaired, the gunboat Mound City breached the dam and eventually the rest of the fleet was safely below the falls.

== Modern day ==
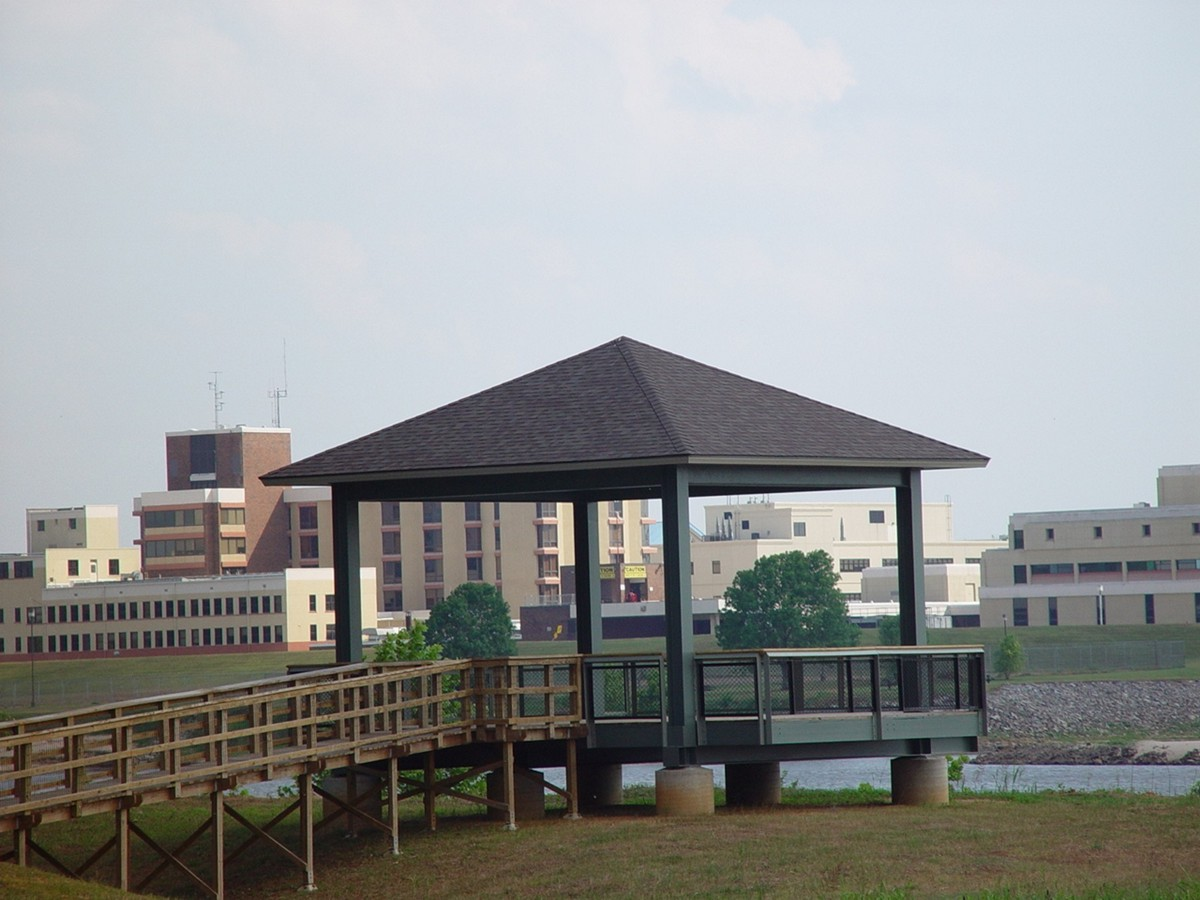
Remnants of the dam can now be seen from Forts Randolph and Buhlow State Historic Site at this overlook.

Bailey's Dam Site was listed in the National Register of Historic Places in 1976. Remnants of the dam existed and could be seen during low river levels until 1987 when the U.S. Army Corps of Engineers completed the John Overton Lock and Dam downstream, which flooded the site. The Corps of Engineers had sponsored excavations of the area in 1984 which helped confirm much of the historical accounts.
