= South Central Tennessee Railroad =

Railroad in Tennessee

Overview
- Headquarters: Centerville, Tennessee
- Reporting mark: SCTR
- Locale: Middle Tennessee
- Dates of operation: 1978–present

Technical
- Track gauge: 4 ft 8 1/2 in (1,435 mm) standard gauge
- Length: 50 miles (80 km)

Other
- Website: Official website

The South Central Tennessee Railroad (reporting mark SCTR) is a shortline railroad in Tennessee founded in 1978. It operates on a single line between the community of Colesburg near Dickson, Tennessee and Hohenwald. The railroad operates entirely on trackage owned by the publicly-owned South Central Tennessee Railroad Authority and is a division of the West Tennessee Railroad.

== History ==
The railroad was constructed as the Centerville Branch of the Louisville and Nashville (L&N) railroad. The service largely focused on freight, including finished goods, farm products, phosphate, iron ore, and timber products. In its early years, the line also was served by a Monday through Saturday daily round trip passenger train.

By the 1970s, the line had deteriorated substantially. Only two trains per week ran the route, and it was in such poor condition that derailments were not uncommon. In 1977, the L&N received permission from the Interstate Commerce Commission to abandon the line, with a scheduled closure date of July 1, 1978. This closure threatened the already tenuous status of the local economies of the surrounding rural counties, with multiple large employers in Hohenwald and Centerville facing insolvency with the loss of the line. Before the line was closed, the governments of Hickman, Lewis, Wayne, and Perry counties with the support of the Tennessee Valley Authority and the Tennessee Department of Transportation formed the South Central Tennessee Railroad Authority to purchase the tracks and associated infrastructure in 1978, forming the South Central Tennessee Railroad to operate on the line.

== Operations ==
The SCTR leases the line, tracks, and bridges from the Authority, and continues limited operations on the line hauling produce, timber products, automotive parts, and other consumer and industrial goods. As of 2018, the Authority and Railroad were seeking funding to conduct major infrastructure improvements, including replacement and refurbishment of bridges and trestles that were past their operating lives. The SCTR, like other short lines in Tennessee, is largely funded through a state tax on railroad diesel fuel.
