= Memphis, Clarksville and Louisville Railroad =

Railway in the United States

Overview
- Locale: Tennessee and Kentucky, United States
- Dates of operation: 1852 (chartered); 1859–1872
- Successor: Louisville and Nashville Railroad (1872); CSX Transportation; R.J. Corman Railroad Group (1987)

Technical
- Track gauge: 5 ft (1,524 mm)
- Length: 83 mi (134 km)

The Memphis, Clarksville and Louisville Railroad (MC&L) was a railway in the southern United States. It was chartered in Tennessee in 1852, and opened in 1859. The MC&L entered receivership after the American Civil War, and financial troubles led to an 11-day strike in 1868 that ended when Louisville and Nashville Railroad (L&N) leased the line. L&N finally purchased the MC&L in 1871 and operated it as its Memphis Branch. L&N was merged into CSX, and CSX sold the former MC&L line to R.J. Corman Railroad Group in 1987, becoming that company's Memphis Line.

== History ==
The company received its original charter on January 28, 1852, and amended its charter in 1854 to merge with the Nashville and Memphis Railroad and to build a line from Memphis through Clarksville to the state border in the direction of Bowling Green, Kentucky. Construction began in Fall 1854. (Note: According to the Nashville Daily Patriot, the groundbreaking ceremony occurred in 1856.) In 1855 the charter was amended to allow it to build into Kentucky to a point on the Tennessee River to connect with the Memphis and Ohio Railroad. After construction had begun, William Andrew Quarles was appointed president, succeeding William B. Munford.

The first train operated between Clarksville and Guthrie, Kentucky, on October 1, 1859, becoming the first railroad to operate in Clarksville. The line's extension to Bowling Green was completed on September 16, 1860, with the first regular train operating through to Bowling Green on September 24. A ceremonial first train was operated on September 18, including a symbolic handshake between William Quarles and James Guthrie of the L&N at the Kentucky/Tennessee state line. The 83-mile (134 km) line of 5 ft (1,524 mm) gauge track connected with the Memphis and Ohio Railroad and the Louisville and Nashville Railroad (L&N) between Memphis and Louisville. In Louisville, the railroad used the L&N Depot as the terminal for its passenger trains, and provided connections through to New Orleans via Humboldt, Tennessee.

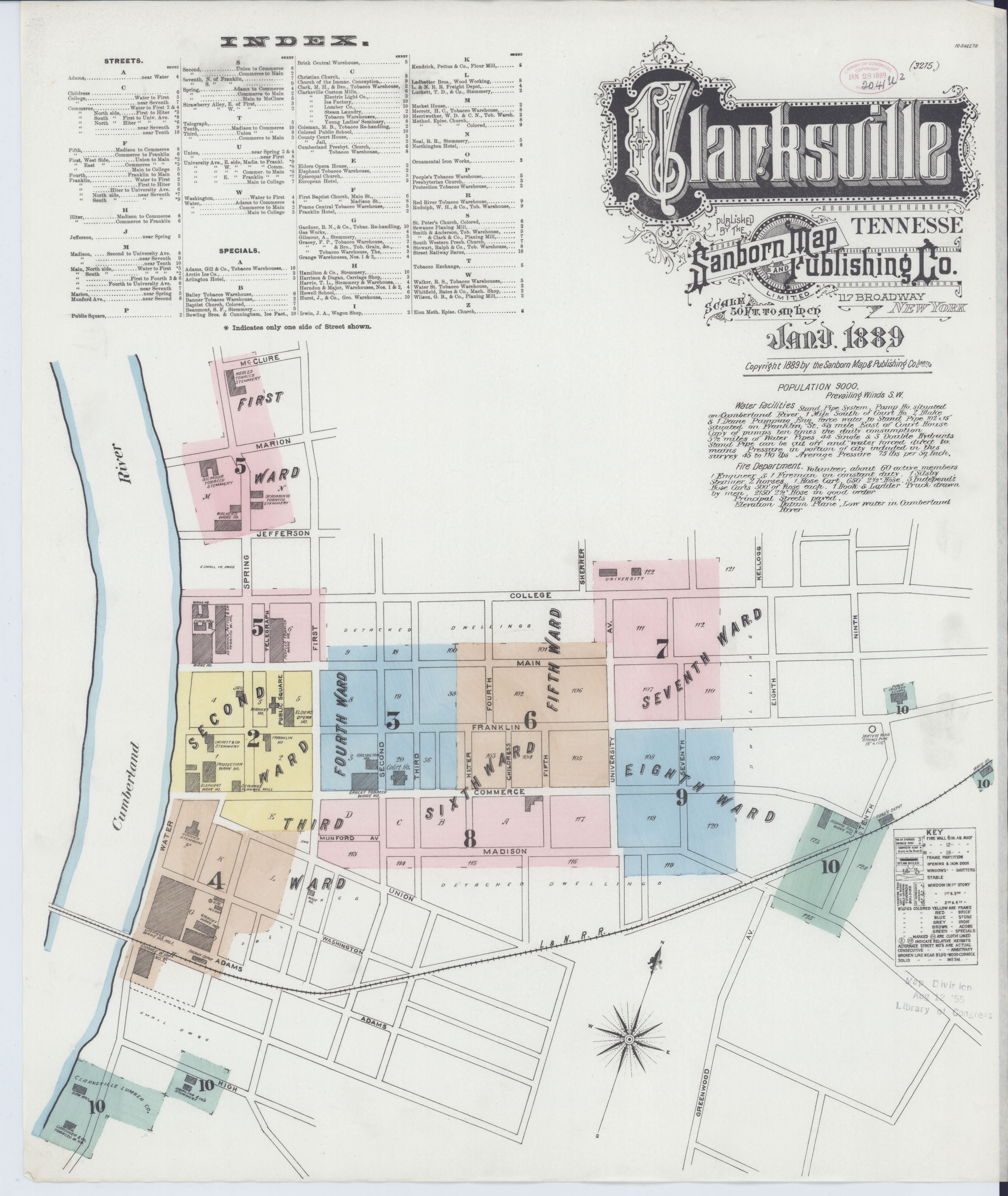
Sanborn Fire Insurance map of Clarksville in 1889 showing the locations of the freight and passenger stations in the city, then owned by L&N.

Its line was heavily damaged during the American Civil War, and the MC&L entered receivership in July 1865 under George T. Lewis. Assistance to restore the line to service was offered by the L&N, (Note: Additional records of the offer by L&N are held by the Filson Historical Society, in their collection of Louisville and Nashville Railroad Company Records, 1836-1912.) which was declined by the MC&L. The line was restored soon after the war, reopening on August 13, 1866. Heavy rain again caused disruption in December 1866 through a landslide near Clarksville. In 1868 the railroad was bankrupt and could not pay its wages; this led to an 11-day strike in February, during which time through trains from Memphis to Louisville were routed on competing lines via Nashville and McKenzie. The strike ended when the L&N leased the line on February 17. The railroad was dissolved on September 30, 1871, then purchased by the L&N. Although the L&N's purchase was effective as of October 1, 1871, the company's accounting was kept separate until October 1872. L&N operated the line as its Memphis Branch, but saw declining traffic through the early 20th century, with the last passenger train serving Clarksville in February 1968. (Note: Despite the similarity in title, the 1966 song "Last Train to Clarksville" does not refer to this station or its passenger service. But, the city of Clarksville later used the song in promotion of local industrial development.) L&N was merged into CSX, and CSX sold the former MC&L line to R.J. Corman Railroad Group in 1987, becoming that company's Memphis Line.
