= Louisville, New Orleans and Texas Railway =

Railway line in the United States

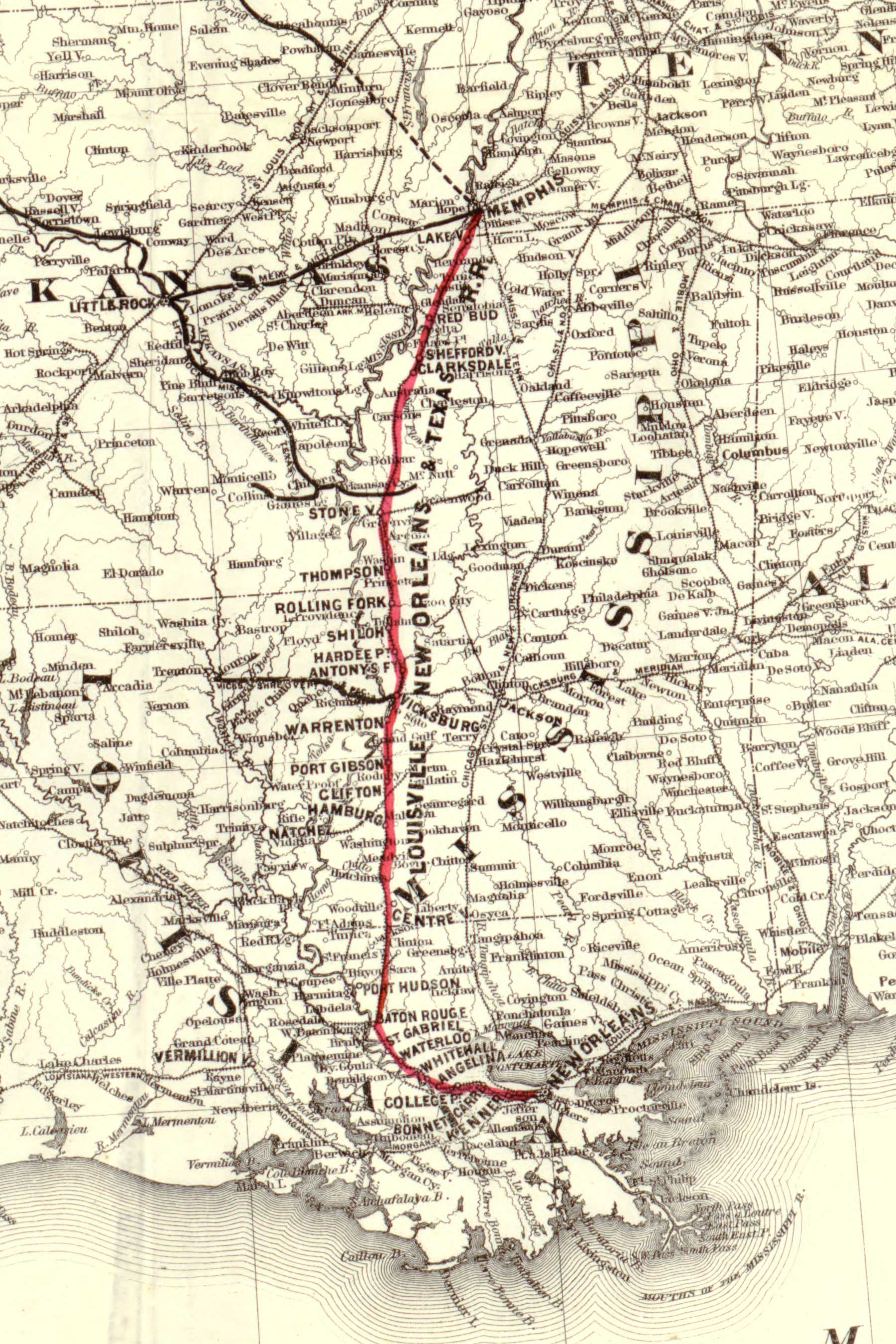
- Map showing the route of the Louisville, New Orleans, and Texas Railway and its connecting lines

Overview
- Locale: Southern United States
- Dates of operation: 1888–

Technical
- Track gauge: Standard gauge

The Louisville, New Orleans and Texas Railway was built between 1888 and 1890 and was admitted to the Illinois Central Railroad system in 1892. It ran between Memphis, Tennessee, and New Orleans, Louisiana, through Vicksburg, Mississippi, and Baton Rouge.

== Companies ==
Iterations of the Louisville, New Orleans and Texas Railway include:

- Clinton and Port Hudson Railroad 1889
- Mississippi Valley and Ship Island Railroad 1884
  - Grand Gulf and Port Gibson Railroad 1881
- Mobile and Northwestern Railroad 1891
- Natchez, Jackson and Columbus Railroad 1890
- West Feliciana Railway 1889

== Legacy ==
The subsidiary Clinton and Port Hudson Railroad is commemorated by the Old Hickory Railroad, a narrow-gauge tourist railway in Jackson, LA.
