= New Orleans and Ohio Railroad =

The New Orleans and Ohio Railroad was a railway company which existed briefly in the 1850s and 1860s, mainly in Kentucky.

== History ==
Despite the name, the New Orleans and Ohio Railroad never actually connected to either New Orleans or Ohio, running at its maximum extent only the 61 miles from Paducah, Kentucky just over the border to Union City, Tennessee, in 5 ft (1,524 mm) gauge.

Although chartered in 1852 and under construction in December, 1853, a long hiatus in construction delayed junction with the Mobile and Ohio Railroad until April 11, 1861. The railroad was heavily damaged by the Confederate States Army in 1862.

Officers of the company in 1861 were Milton Brown, president, and J. J. Williams, chief engineer.

== See also ==
- List of defunct Kentucky railroads
