= Rogersville and Jefferson Railroad =

Overview
- Locale: Alabama
- Dates of operation: 1860–1884
- Successor: Tennessee and Ohio Railroad Company; East Tennessee, Virginia and Georgia Railroad Company

Technical
- Track gauge: 4 ft 8 1/2 in (1,435 mm) standard gauge
- Previous gauge: 5 ft (1,524 mm); American Civil War era and 4 ft 9 in (1,448 mm)

Rogersville and Jefferson Railroad Company was incorporated under special act of Tennessee on February 27, 1852.

In 1860, the company completed construction of 12.1 miles (19.5 km) of 5 ft (1,524 mm) gauge railroad line between Bulls Gap, Tennessee and Holston River, Tennessee.

Financing for the construction of the railroad and its rehabilitation after the American Civil War was obtained mainly through the State of Tennessee.

In 1867, the company constructed 2 miles (3.2 km) of railroad line between Holston River, Tennessee and Rogersville, Tennessee.

The company was placed in receivership by the Governor of Tennessee in 1866 because it defaulted on the payment of the interest on its debt. The State of Tennessee appointed commissioners during the years 1867–1871 to sell the delinquent railroads on which the State had statutory liens. On March 20, 1872, Joseph Jacques, agent for the East Tennessee, Virginia and Georgia Railroad Company, bid $23,000 for the property. A court confirmed the sale on November 18, 1873. On December 26, 1873, the railroad line was sold to W. P. Elliott, who operated the line until September 13, 1877. On that date, W. P. Elliott conveyed the property to H. M. Aiken, who operated the property until October 24, 1884. On that date, Aiken conveyed the property to the Tennessee and Ohio Railroad Company.

The Tennessee and Ohio Railroad Company conveyed the property to East Tennessee, Virginia and Georgia Railroad Company on July 22, 1889.

The property eventually became part of Southern Railway Company on July 7, 1894, through its acquisition of the East Tennessee, Virginia and Georgia Railway Company.

== See also ==
- Confederate railroads in the American Civil War
