= List of Andrews Raiders =

Participants in the Great Locomotive Chase, or Andrews's Raid, 1862.

Image	Rank	Name	Unit	Following Raid	Medal of Honor	Notes
	Civilian	James J. Andrews (c. 1829 – 1862)	None	Captured; tried May; escaped June 1; recaptured June 2; hanged June 7, 1862	Ineligible as a civilian	Leader of the raid
	Private	William Bensinger (1840–1918)	21st Ohio	Exchanged March 18, 1863	March 25, 1863	Later promoted to captain
	Private	Wilson W. Brown (1837–1916)	21st Ohio	Escaped October 16	September 17, 1863	Engineer. Later promoted to 2nd lieutenant. Wounded at the Battle of Chickamauga.
	Private	Robert Buffum (1828–1871)	21st Ohio	Exchanged March 18, 1863	March 25, 1863	Later promoted to 2nd lieutenant
	Civilian	William Hunter Campbell (1839–1862)	None	Hanged June 18, 1862	Ineligible as a civilian	
	Corporal	Daniel A. Dorsey (1838–1918)	33rd Ohio	Escaped October 16	September 17, 1863	Later promoted to 1st lieutenant
	Corporal	Martin J. Hawkins (1830–1886)	33rd Ohio	Escaped October 16	September 17, 1863	Engineer. Overslept and did not participate; attempted to enlist in Confederate unit; later promoted to sergeant
	Private	William James Knight (1837–1916)	21st Ohio	Escaped October 16	September 17, 1863	Engineer.
	Corporal	Samuel Llewellyn (1841–1915)	33rd Ohio	Deserted back to Federal lines prior to Raid	No award	Did not participate; enlisted in a Confederate unit before reaching Marietta; later promoted to sergeant
	Sergeant	Elihu H. Mason (1831–1896)	21st Ohio	Exchanged March 18, 1863	March 25, 1863	Later promoted to captain. Later captured in Battle of Chickamauga.
	Private	Jacob Parrott (1843–1908)	33rd Ohio	Exchanged March 18, 1863	March 25, 1863 (First)	Later promoted to 1st lieutenant
	Corporal	William Pittenger (1840–1904)	2nd Ohio; Company G	Exchanged March 18, 1863	March 25, 1863	Later promoted to sergeant
	Private	John Reed Porter (1838–1923)	21st Ohio	Escaped October 16	September 17, 1863	Overslept and did not participate; attempted to enlist in Confederate unit; later promoted to 1st lieutenant; last living raider
	Corporal	William H. H. Reddick (1840–1903)	33rd Ohio	Exchanged March 18, 1863	March 25, 1863	Later promoted to 2nd lieutenant
	Private	Samuel Robertson (1843–1862)	33rd Ohio	Hanged June 18, 1862	September 17, 1863	Received award posthumously
	Sergeant Major	Marion A. Ross (1832–1862)	2nd Ohio	Hanged June 18, 1862	September 17, 1863	Received award posthumously
	Sergeant	John Morehead Scott (1839–1862)	21st Ohio	Hanged June 18, 1862	August 4, 1866	Received award posthumously
	Private	Charles Perry Shadrack (1840–1862)	2nd Ohio	Hanged June 18, 1862	July 3, 2024	Real name was Phillip Gephart Shadrach. MOH authorized under Public Law January 28, 2008 (H.R. 4986; sec 564), however, by omission, this was not awarded until 2024.
	Private	Samuel Slavens (1831–1862)	33rd Ohio	Hanged June 18, 1862	July 28, 1883	Received award posthumously
	Private	Ovid Wellford Smith (1844–1868)	2nd Ohio	Arrested but not identified as a raider. Somehow returned to federal lines.	July 6, 1864	Used name James Smith. Did not participate because he was detained by Confederate Army. Enlisted in a Confederate unit before reaching Marietta. Later promoted to corporal.
	Private	George D. Wilson (1830–1862)	2nd Ohio	Hanged June 18, 1862	July 3, 2024	MOH authorized under Public Law January 28, 2008 (H.R. 4986; sec 565) however, by omission, this was not awarded until 2024.
	Private	John Alfred Wilson (1832–1904)	21st Ohio	Escaped October 16	September 17, 1863	
	Private	John Wollam (1840–1890)	33rd Ohio	Captured. Escaped June 1. Recaptured late June. Escaped again October 16.	July 20, 1864	Later captured in Battle of Chickamauga.
	Private	Mark Wood (1839–1866)	21st Ohio	Escaped October 16	September 17, 1863	Later captured in Battle of Chickamauga. Promoted to 2nd lieutenant.
