= Medal of Honor Day =

Annual American day recognizing Medal of Honor recipients

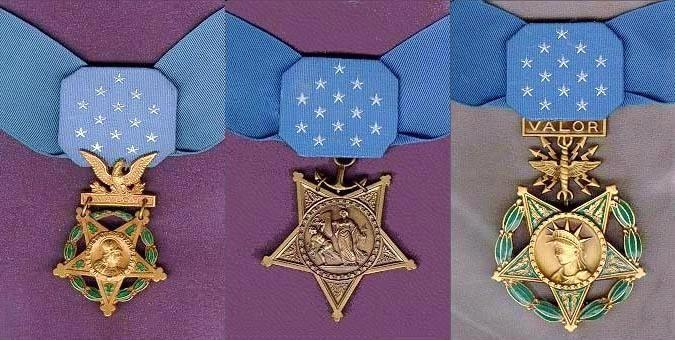
- Army, Navy, and Air Force versions of the Medal of Honor
- Observed by: United States
- Type: National
- Date: March 25
- Frequency: Annual

Medal of Honor Day is a United States federal observance that is celebrated every year on March 25. It was created to honor the "heroism and sacrifice of Medal of Honor recipients for the United States." The holiday has been celebrated since 1991, when George H. W. Bush signed Public Law 101-564 on November 15, 1990, which was passed by the 101st United States Congress in November 1990, and created it. The holiday was chosen to be celebrated on March 25 to honor the 23 men who participated in the Great Locomotive Chase and received Medals of Honor for it, particularly William Bensinger, Robert Buffum, Elihu H. Mason, Jacob Parrott, William Pittenger, and William H. H. Reddick, who received the first six Medals of Honor on March 25, 1863. The law reads (in part):

Whereas the Medal of Honor is the highest distinction that can be awarded by the president, in the name of the congress, to members of the armed forces who have distinguished themselves conspicuously by gallantry and intrepidity at the risk of their lives above and beyond the call of duty ... Whereas public awareness of the importance of the Medal of Honor has declined in recent years; and Whereas the designation of National Medal of Honor Day will focus the efforts of national, State, and local organizations striving to foster public appreciation and recognition of Medal of Honor recipients."
