= The Great Locomotive Chase =

1956 film by Francis D. Lyon

- Theatrical release poster
- Directed by: Francis D. Lyon
- Written by: Lawrence Edward Watkin
- Produced by: Lawrence Edward Watkin; Walt Disney
- Starring: Fess Parker; Jeffrey Hunter; John Lupton; Jeff York; Slim Pickens
- Cinematography: Charles Boyle
- Edited by: Ellsworth Hoagland
- Music by: Paul J. Smith
- Production company: Walt Disney Productions
- Distributed by: Buena Vista Distribution
- Release date: June 8, 1956
- Running time: 87 minutes
- Country: United States
- Language: English
- Box office: $1.7 million (US)

The Great Locomotive Chase is a 1956 American adventure Western film produced by Walt Disney Productions, based on the Great Locomotive Chase that occurred in 1862 during the American Civil War. Filmed in CinemaScope and in color, the film stars Fess Parker as James J. Andrews, the leader of a group of Union soldiers from various Ohio regiments who volunteered to go behind Confederate lines in civilian clothes, steal a Confederate train north of Atlanta, and drive it back to Union lines in Tennessee, tearing up railroad tracks and destroying bridges and telegraph lines along the way.

Written and produced by Lawrence Edward Watkin and directed by Francis D. Lyon, the 85-minute full-color film also features Jeffrey Hunter, John Lupton, Kenneth Tobey, Don Megowan, and Slim Pickens. Paul J. Smith composed the score. Filmed in Georgia and North Carolina, along the now abandoned Tallulah Falls Railway, it was released in U.S. theaters by Buena Vista Distribution Company on June 8, 1956, and capitalized on Parker's growing fame as an actor from his portrayal of Davy Crockett. The film reteamed him with Jeff York, who had portrayed Mike Fink in the 1954-1955 Davy Crockett miniseries.

== Plot ==
In April 1862, Cpl. William Pittenger and several other soldiers, including William Campbell, are posted outside Nashville under orders from General Mitchell. James J. Andrews rides in to speak to Mitchell, who assigns him the mission of hijacking a train behind Confederate lines and destroying the bridges along the Western and Atlantic Railroad in order to delay reinforcements against Mitchell's planned attack on Chattanooga, as well as cripple the Confederate army's supply lines, possibly putting an end to the war. Pittenger, Campbell, and more soldiers meet Andrews the next night on a hillside where he tells them to arrive in Marietta, Georgia by April 10. Over the next three days, the men travel south through Confederate territory in small groups so as not to draw suspicion. Pittenger and Campbell rendezvous with Andrews and two others at an inn on the Tennessee River, but rain causes Andrews to delay the attempt for a day.

On the morning of April 12, Andrews and the raiders congregate in a railroad hotel in Marietta. They board a northbound train, pulled on that day by the General, a locomotive waiting for the breakfast stop at Big Shanty. While on the train, Andrews is approached by the conductor, William A. Fuller, who is suspicious about the men he boarded with. Andrews shows Fuller a letter from Brigadier General Beauregard; this convinces Fuller that Andrews and his men are Confederate agents. While the passengers and crew eat, Andrews and the men drop the passenger cars, hijack the engine, and proceed north. Witnessing this, Fuller pursues them on foot along with engineer Jeff Cain and foreman Anthony Murphy. Andrews and the men continue on, pulling up track to block any trains from the south and cutting telegraph wires to stop any towns ahead of them from being alerted. Fuller and his men continue to pursue the raiders; first on foot, then by handcar, then on the small yard engine Yonah.

The raiders make their scheduled stop at Kingston to wait for a southbound freight train. Andrews disguises their mission from the suspicious station staff by claiming that he is running an extra ammunition supply train to Beauregard. Once the southbound train arrives, the raiders learn, to their surprise, that Mitchell had captured Huntsville ahead of schedule and the Confederates are now running extra freight trains down south, including another train coming in from the north unscheduled. After 45 minutes of extra waiting, the last train arrives, and the raiders continue north. Fuller and his men eventually reach Kingston. After alerting the station master of the situation, Fuller and his men take a locomotive, the William R. Smith, waiting on the side track and continue until reaching another section of removed track. Fuller and Murphy then wave down Pete Bracken and his southbound express freight and continue the chase with his engine, the Texas, running in reverse.

The raiders try to stop their pursuers but only slow them down. The raiders arrive at the first bridge and attempt to burn it down by lighting a boxcar and setting the brake it so as to prevent it from being moved. Fuller disables the brake and the Texas pushes the car out, leaving the bridge intact. With the General out of wood and water and unable to continue, Andrews decides to stop and fight, but before they can, Confederate cavalry from Ringgold approach, sent by General Leadbetter after Fuller got a telegraph sent ahead of the raiders. Fuller arrives and reclaims his train as the raiders, having failed in their mission, flee into the wilderness and try to make it back home.

Over the next week, the raiders are hunted down and captured. The group is transferred from jail to jail across the south, ultimately learning that they have been found guilty and are to be hanged soon. One day, while in their cell in Atlanta, one of them manages to break the group's chains, and they plan to escape the next morning. All men make it over the wall of the jail yard except Andrews and Campbell, who stay behind to fight off their captors. Eight of the raiders, including Pittenger, manage to escape while the rest are recaptured. Before his execution, Andrews requests a final visit from Fuller, who begrudgingly shows up. Andrews expresses hopes that Fuller will not hold a grudge for deceiving him, acknowledging that they both fought in their own ways. Andrews laments that he will not live to see the end of the war, when both sides come together and shake hands. He asks Fuller if they could do so instead, and Fuller obliges, marking the end of their war and putting Andrews at peace.

On March 25, 1863, the eight surviving raiders are summoned to the US War Department and are brought before War Secretary Edwin Stanton to receive the first Medals of Honor. Stanton says that their perished comrades will also receive the Medal of Honor posthumously, with the exception of Andrews who is ineligible due to being a civilian operative (also excluding William Campbell). Pittenger thanks Stanton on behalf of all of the raiders.

== Cast ==
- Fess Parker as James J. Andrews, Union spy and leader of the volunteers
- Jeffrey Hunter as William A. Fuller, conductor of the Confederate train
- Jeff York as William Campbell, Union civilian Volunteer
- John Lupton as Cpl. William Pittenger, Union soldier
- Eddie Firestone as Robert Buffum, Union soldier
- Kenneth Tobey as Anthony Murphy, Confederate railroad superintendent
- Don Megowan as Marion A. Ross, Union soldier
- Claude Jarman Jr. as Jacob Parrott, Union soldier, first Medal of Honor recipient
- Harry Carey Jr. as William Bensinger, Union soldier
- Leonard P. Geer as James A. Wilson (as Lennie Geer), Union soldier
- George Robotham as William Knight, Union soldier/civilian train engineer/fireman
- Stan Jones as Wilson W. Brown, Union soldier/civilian train engineer/fireman
- Marc Hamilton as John Wollam, Union soldier
- John Wiley as John M. Scott, Union soldier
- Slim Pickens as Pete Bracken
- Morgan Woodward as Alex, a Confederate soldier singing on troop train
- W.S. Bearden as Switchman
- Harvey Hester as Jess McIntyre
- Chuck Roberson as Confederate Prison Captain (uncredited)
- Dick Sargent as Unnamed Union soldier (uncredited)
- Dale Van Sickel as Alonzo Martin (uncredited)

== Production ==
Jeffrey Hunter was borrowed from 20th Century Fox.

=== Location ===
By the 1950s the Western and Atlantic Railroad tracks where the Chase took place in 1862 were a modernized main line of the Nashville, Chattanooga and St. Louis Railway (now CSX), and unsuitable as background for a Civil War era film. The Disney studios looked about fifty miles (80 km) east to the Tallulah Falls Railway, a somewhat decrepit, but scenic shortline with photogenic curves and several wooden trestles. The film was shot at various points along the 35 miles (56 km) between Franklin, North Carolina and Cornelia, Georgia.

=== Locomotives and rolling stock ===
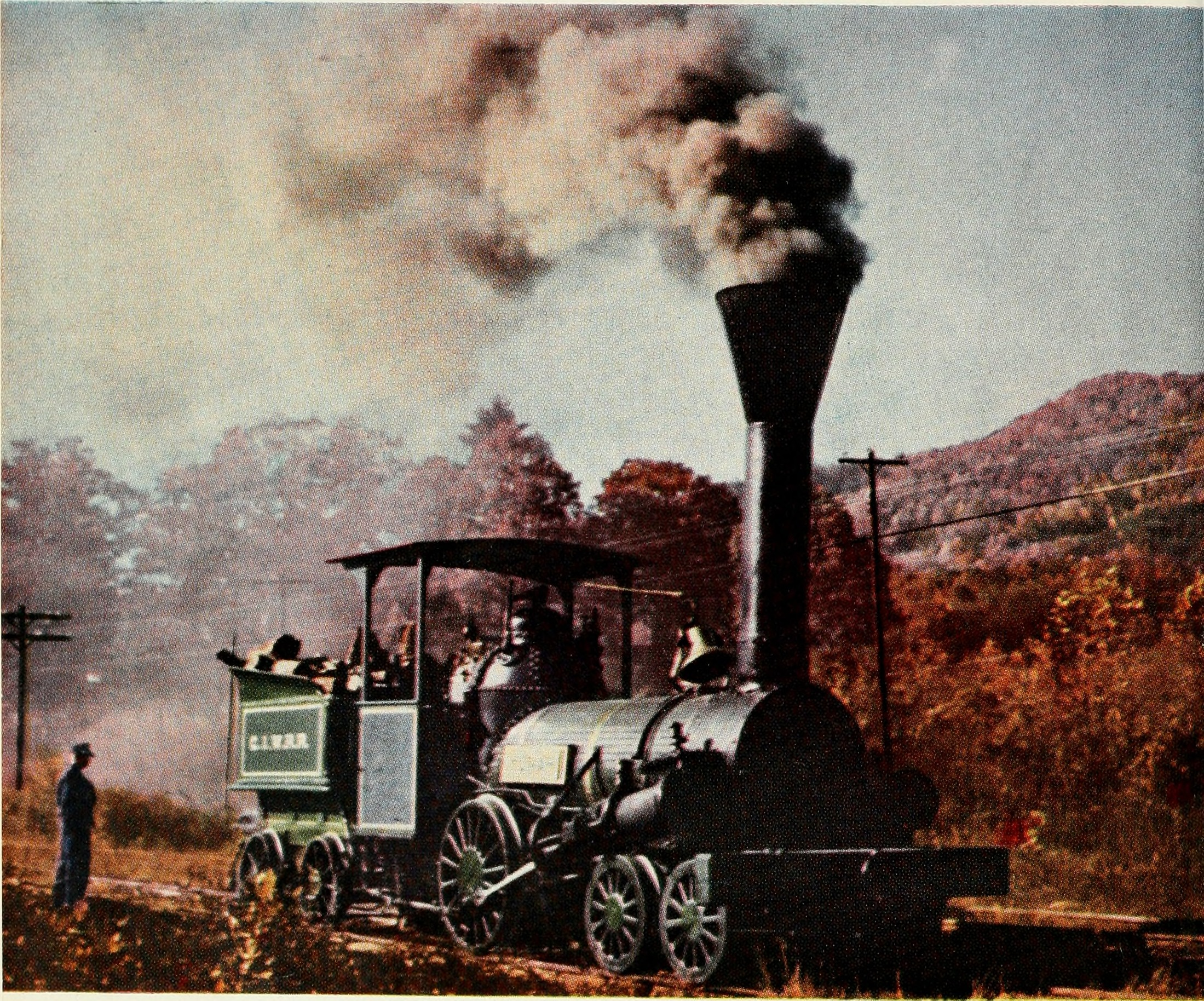
Replica of the Lafayette, which portrayed the Yonah, during filming of The Great Locomotive Chase.

The first of three locomotives commandeered by conductor William A. Fuller, the Yonah, was portrayed in the film by the Lafayette, a 1927-built 4-2-0 replica of an identical locomotive of the same name built in 1837 yet the original Yonah, however, did not have a 4-2-0 design, but was a 4-4-0 design that pre-dated the newer 4-4-0 designs of the other locomotives involved in the Chase.

Two of the locomotives used in the actual Chase had been preserved, though were not in working order. In 1956, the General was on display at Chattanooga Union Station, and the Texas was at the Atlanta Cyclorama. It would have been too costly to make them safely operational, but fortunately Disney had access to two working 4-4-0's of nearly identical appearance, both movie veterans: the William Mason and Inyo. For the film, with changes to the paintwork the William Mason became both the General & the "Catoosa", and Inyo served as both the Texas and the William R. Smith.

Disney rented the Inyo from Paramount Studios, who owned it at the time. Mason and Lafayette were rented from the B&O Railroad Museum (now known as the National Museum of Railroad History & Innovation), as were five Civil War era cars: two coaches and a baggage car finished in bright yellow, and two iron ammunition cars. The studio also constructed five wooden boxcars which could be, and were, destroyed during the filming.

=== The locomotives today ===
As of March 2021, the two surviving locomotives from the chase, and the three which appeared in the film, were located as follows:

- The General is displayed at the Southern Museum of Civil War and Locomotive History in Kennesaw, Georgia (A shooting script of The Great Locomotive Chase is on this display along with movie posters for both France and Spain in the French and Spanish languages, respectively.).
- The Texas is displayed at the Atlanta History Center in Buckhead.
- Lafayette, (in the film as the Yonah) is displayed at the National Museum of Railroad History & Innovation.
- The William Mason is also displayed at the National Museum of Railroad History & Innovation.
- Inyo is displayed, and occasionally operated, at the Nevada State Railroad Museum in Carson City, Nevada.

== Songs ==
1. "Dixie" — sung by Fess Parker, et al.
2. "A Rebel I Will Be Until I Die" — sung by Morgan Woodward.
3. "Sons of Old Aunt Dinah" - lyrics by Lawrence Edward Watkin and music by Stan Jones, sung by Morgan Woodward, et al.
4. "I Stole a Locomotive Just to Take a Ride 'Cause My Daddy Was a Railroading Man" — sung by Jeff York, John Lupton, et al.
5. "Roll Jordan Roll, I Want to Go to Heaven When I Die" — sung by Fess Parker, et al.
6. "Tenting on the Old Camp Ground" — classic Civil War hymn sung by Fess Parker, Jeff York, John Lupton, et al.

== Reception and legacy ==
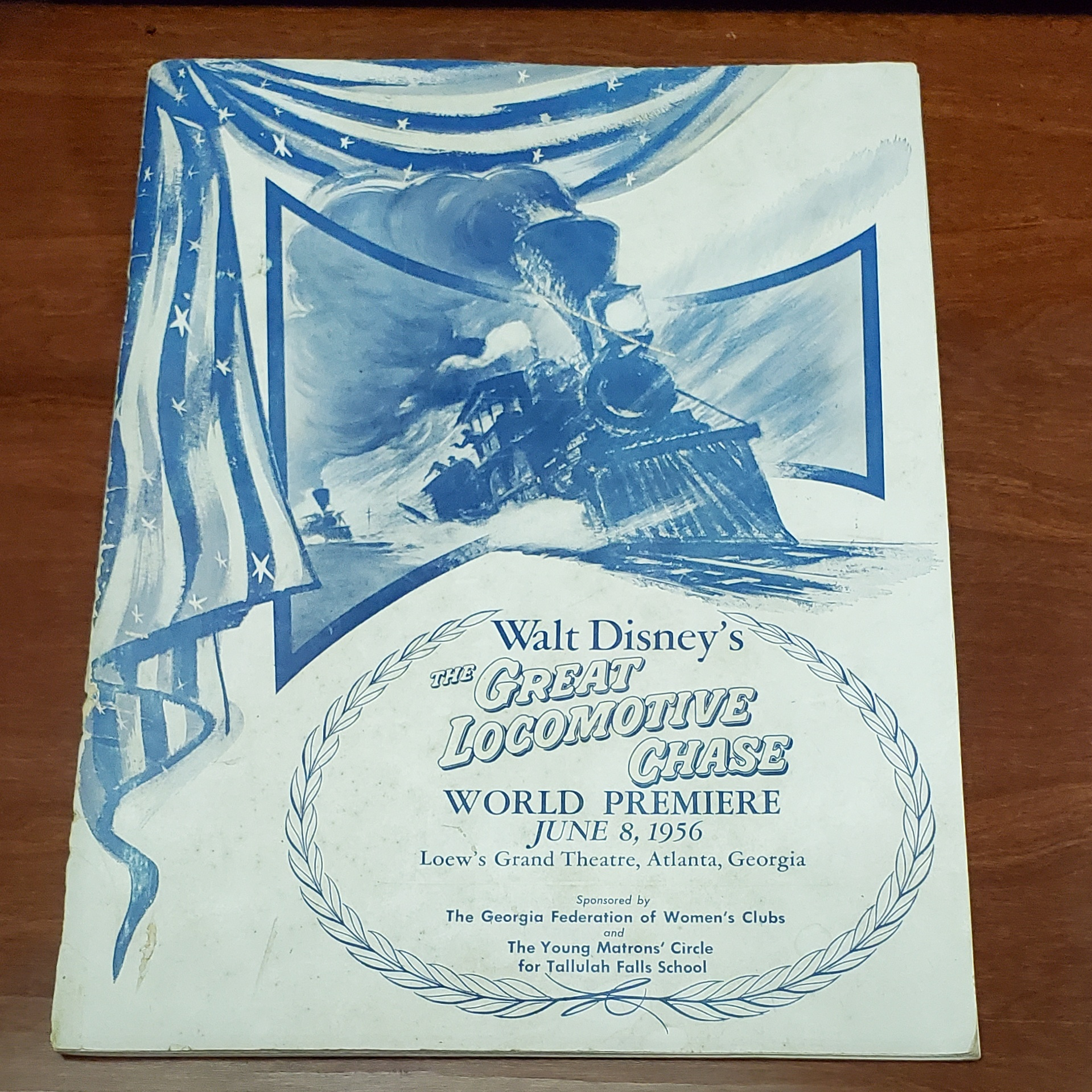
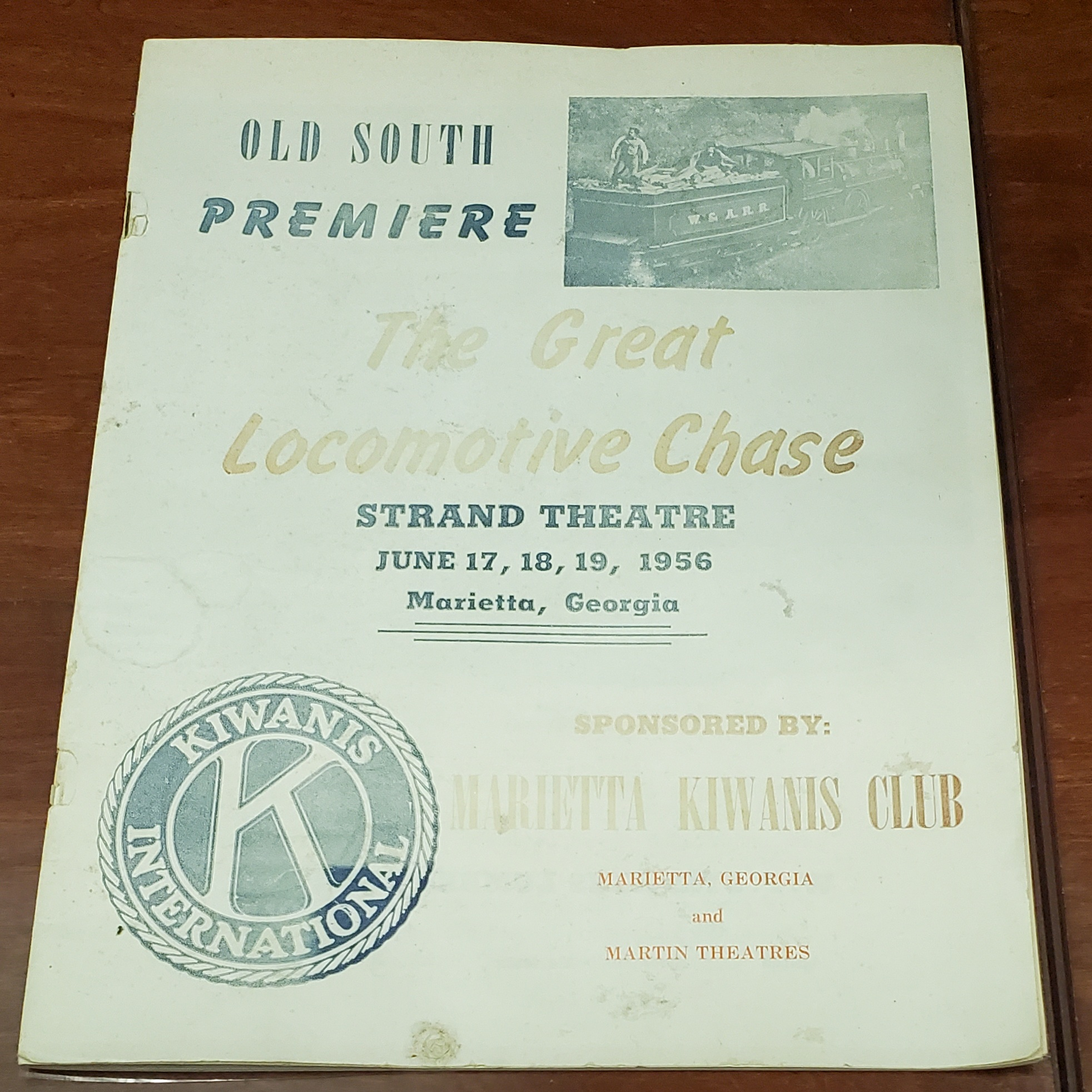
Theater programs for the film's premieres in Atlanta and Marietta, Georgia.

The film received mixed reviews upon its release. Though given acceptable reviews by most critics, the film was not as successful as Walt Disney had hoped it would be. This may have been due to the anticlimactic ending, where the Union spies are captured, jailed, and attempt to escape. According to a review by Bosley Crowther of The New York Times, "The excitement is over when they abandon the trains." Moreover, some felt the film to be rather depressing or downbeat since the main characters are unsuccessful in their mission and some, including the lead character, wind up being executed.

Variety wrote: "It varies between good and fair entertainment values, with enough exciting passages to promise okay prospects at the box office." Harrison's Reports declared: "This Walt Disney historical melodrama should give fairly good satisfaction to the general run of audiences ... The action moves at a swift pace throughout, and is filled with many exciting, if incredible, situations before the raiders are caught." The Monthly Film Bulletin wrote: "Despite the lack of inventive incident, the story has a number of tense sequences, without, perhaps, rivalling the pace and gusto of Davy Crockett. The attempt to present both pursuer and pursued as equally attractive figures is highly successful, but this inevitably weakens the drama of the situation."

The film was first released on video in 1983 and later on DVD (first on April 25, 2000 and re-released on May 4, 2004).

It was also one of the last films to depict the Andrews Raid of 1862.

== See also ==
- List of films and television shows about the American Civil War
- List of American films of 1956
- The General (1926)
