= Battle of Scary Creek =

Battle of the American Civil War

Coordinates: 38°26′00″N 81°51′12″W

- Part of the American Civil War
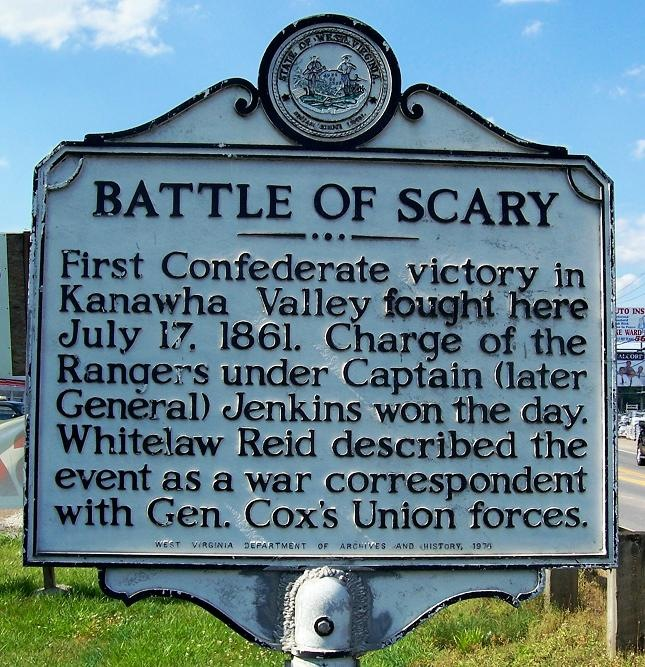
- Plaque commemorating the Battle of Scary Creek
| Date | July 17, 1861 |
| Location | Mouth of Scary Creek, in Scary, Putnam County, West Virginia |
| Result | Confederate victory |

Belligerents
| United States of America (Union) | Confederate States of America |

Commanders and leaders
| Jacob Dolson Cox; John W. Lowe; Jesse Norton (WIA) | Henry A. Wise; George S. Patton, Sr (WIA); Albert G. Jenkins |

Strength
| 1,000+ (est.) | 800 |

Casualties and losses
| 14 killed, 30 wounded, 7 captured | 4 killed, 6 wounded |

The Battle of Scary Creek was a minor battle fought on July 17, 1861, during the American Civil War in Scary across the Kanawha River from present day Nitro in Putnam County, West Virginia. It was the first Confederate victory in Kanawha Valley.

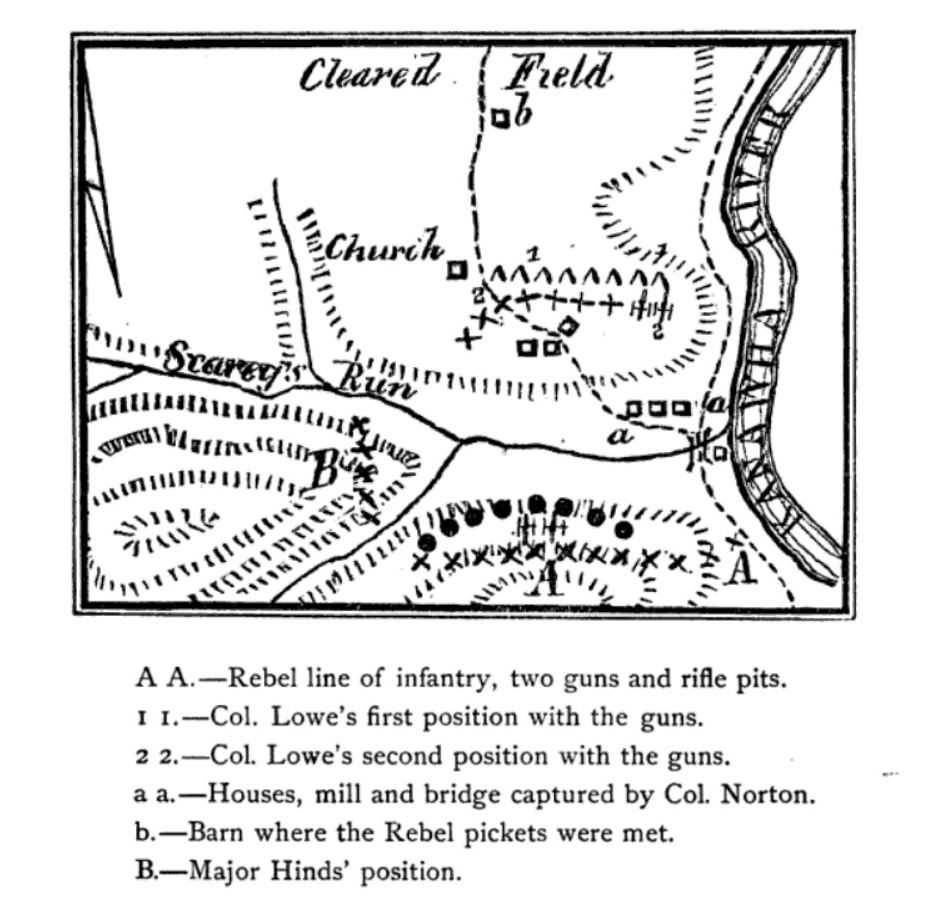
Battle of Scary Creek, Putnam County, Virginia, 1861

== Background ==
The battle occurred three months after the beginning of the war and days before the first major battle at Manassas (Bull Run).

Union forces under General Jacob Cox began a push up the Kanawha Valley from Ohio. In June and July, he had captured Ravenswood, Ripley, and Guyandotte, and he split his force into three columns to advance to Charleston. One column met Confederate resistance at Barboursville on July 13 and 14, while Cox’s main force established a camp near Poca.

Confederate General Henry A. Wise commanded a few thousand troops stationed near St. Albans, just south of Scary and Poca, and intended to halt the Union advance.

=== Skirmishes at Poca ===
Early on the morning of July 14, while fighting occurred at Barboursville, Cox sent a detachment of the 21st Ohio Infantry, Companies F, G, and H, towards Scary to reconnoiter the Confederate positions. After an eight-mile march, the Union force met Confederate pickets and artillery at Scary Creek, and after a brief skirmish, fell back to the main Union column. The following day, another small skirmish occurred as Confederate pickets probed the Union camp at Poca, on the north side of the Kanawha River. Union reconnaissance discovered the Confederates fortifying a position at Scary Creek on the opposite side of the river, so Cox pushed elements of his force to occupy both sides of the river and wait for supply wagons to reinforce them.

On the morning of July 17, Cox sent Lt. Col. Carr B. White with a detachment of the 12th Ohio Infantry to probe the Confederate positions at Scary Creek. Around 9 am, Carr and his men were ferried across the river from Camp Poco to the farm of John Morgan. Confederate sentries noticed the Union movements and fell back to their lines to warn George Patton.

White advanced to Scary and met resistance at the mouth of the creek when Confederate pickets fired on them. White, under orders not to bring on an engagement, retreated back to camp to inform Cox.

During the meeting, Colonel John Lowe of the 12th Ohio requested to conduct an advance on the Confederates and clear them from Scary Creek. Cox approved the request, and Lowe assembled a force of the 12th Ohio Infantry, companies D and K from the 21st Ohio Infantry, George's Ohio Cavalry, and Cotter's and Barnett's Ohio Light Artillery Batteries, consisting of about 1,500 men.

== Order of battle ==
=== Union ===
- 12th Ohio Infantry Regiment - Colonel John Lowe (Union field commander)
- Co. D & K, 21st Ohio Infantry Regiment - Colonel Jesse S. Norton
- George's Independent Ohio Cavalry Company - Captain John S. George
- Cotter's Battery of Ohio Light Artillery - Captain Charles S. Cotter

Reinforcements:

- Co. A, B, C, E, F, G, H & I, 21st Ohio Infantry Regiment - Lt. Colonel James M. Neibling
- 11th Ohio Infantry Regiment - Colonel Charles A. De Villiers
- 2nd Kentucky Infantry Regiment (Union) - Colonel William E. Woodruff

=== Confederate ===
- Kanawha Riflemen - Colonel George S. Patton Sr. (Confederate field commander)
- Kanawha (Charleston) Sharpshooters - Capt. John S. Swann
- Buffalo Guards - Capt. William E. Fife
- Border Guards - Capt. Albert J. Beckett
- Elk River Tigers - Capt. Thomas B. Swann
- Fayetteville Rifles - Capt. Robert A. Bailey
- Mountain Cove Guard - Capt. William Tyree
- Kanawha Border Rangers - Capt. Albert G. Jenkins
- Sandy Rangers - Capt. John M. Corn
- Hale's Battery, Kanawha Artillery - Capt. John P. Hale

== Battle ==
The Federals under Lowe advanced along both the Bill's Creek Road and the River Road towards Scary. At 1:30 pm, they reached and drove in Confederate pickets at Little Scary Creek and approached the main Confederate positions at Scary around 2:00 pm. Lt. Col. George S. Patton, (grandfather of the famous George S. Patton of World War II), commanded the Confederate line behind Harlem Creek, 2 miles from the main Confederate camp. The Union forces quickly engaged the Confederates, launching artillery barrages and musket volleys for an hour.

Around 3:00 pm, companies from the 21st Ohio Infantry under Col. Norton launched a bayonet charge towards the Confederate positions on the bridge, supported by a detachment of the 12th Ohio Infantry led by Colonel Lowe, which forded the creek and attacked the Confederate left flank. The left flank panicked and three-fourths of the Confederates fled. Captain Patton tried to rally his men, but during the attack, was wounded in the left shoulder, and Albert Jenkins assumed command. During the charge, Col. Norton was severely wounded in the hip and captured by the Confederates. Fresh Confederate reinforcements arrived from Coal Knob and drove the Ohioans back from the bridge and the left flank by 5:00 pm.

Sustaining casualties from the fierce bayonet charge and fighting around the bridge, the Federals pulled back, aiming to return to the main column at Camp Poca. Jenkins assumed they intended to regroup for another assault, and he ordered his forces to retreat, leaving the battlefield deserted by both armies. Once the Confederates realized the Federals were not reforming, they returned to burn buildings on the battlefield to prevent their use in another attack.

Throughout the afternoon, Lt. Col. James Neibling of the 21st Ohio Infantry had urged General Cox to send the rest of the 21st Ohio and him across the river to reinforce Lowe and Norton. Cox refused, and the men of the 21st were compelled to wait at the opposite side of the river, listening to the sounds of the nearby battle. When word reached Neibling of Norton's wounding and capture, he immediately took his regiment across the river and marched to join the 12th Ohio and the two companies of the 21st Ohio. They neared the battlefield, but were met by Lowe’s retreating forces, and taking up a rear guard to skirmish with advance Confederate pickets, returned to the main camp.

A group of Union officers at Poca saw the buildings in Scary burning and thought it a sign of a Union victory. They crossed the Kanawha with detachments from the 2nd Kentucky Infantry and 11th Ohio Infantry to meet with the 12th and 21st Ohio, but were surprised by the Confederates and retreated. Col. Charles De Villiers of the 11th Ohio, and Col. William Woodruff, Lt. Col. George Neff, Capt. George Austin, and Capt. John Hurd, all of the 2nd Kentucky, were captured by Jenkins' men and sent to Libby Prison.

== Aftermath ==
General Wise ordered a force of 800 men to attack the Union camp at Poca after the battle around 10:00 pm, but they were repulsed by elements of the Ohio infantry. Despite the tactical victory, General Wise decided to withdraw back up the Kanawha Valley toward the Confederate supply bases in Fayette and Greenbrier Counties in a highly criticized move. Wise blamed his defeat on the secessionist militia in his command writing to Robert E. Lee, his state volunteers "lost from three to five hundred by desertion. But one man from [my] Legion." adding that these men "for nothing for warlike uses here." and that the Kanawha Valley as "wholly disaffected and traitorous." Thus, the victory was hollow for the Confederacy. Wise's retreat resulted in most of the Kanawha Valley falling into Union hands.

== Notable participants ==
Edward Settle Godfrey fought at Scary Creek as a private in Company D, 21st Ohio Infantry.

Americus V. Rice was present at Scary Creek as captain of Company E, 21st Ohio Infantry.

Harrison G. Otis fought at Scary Creek as a sergeant in Company I, 12th Ohio Infantry.

James B. Bell was present at Scary Creek as a corporal in Company H, 11th Ohio Infantry.

Elihu H. Mason was present at Scary Creek as a corporal in Company I, 21st Ohio Infantry.

John Reed Porter was present at Scary Creek as a private in Company A, 21st Ohio Infantry.

== Casualties ==
Casualties were rather light considering the ferocity of the battle. The Union lost 14 killed, around 30 wounded, and several missing. The Confederates lost between one and five killed, and a half a dozen wounded, including Lt. Col. Patton.

Known Union Casualties at Scary Creek
| Name | Regiment | Casualty |
|---|---|---|
| Capt. Thomas G. Allen | Co. D, 21st Ohio Infantry | Killed |
| Pvt. George W.C. Blue | Co. K, 21st Ohio Infantry | Killed |
| Pvt. William P. Taylor | Co. D, 12th Ohio Infantry | Killed |
| Pvt. Jabez Turner | Co. F, 12th Ohio Infantry | Killed |
| Cpl. Frederick Hanford | Co. G, 12th Ohio Infantry | Killed |
| Pvt. Benjamin Hebbel | Co. G, 12th Ohio Infantry | Killed |
| Pvt. John McNeeley | Co. G, 12th Ohio Infantry | Killed |
| Pvt. William Jackson | Co. I, 12th Ohio Infantry | Killed |
| Pvt. Richard Lambert | George’s Independent Ohio Cavalry | Killed |
| 2nd Lt. Guy Pomeroy | Co. D, 21st Ohio Infantry | Mortally Wounded |
| Pvt. Barton Smith | Co. K, 21st Ohio Infantry | Mortally Wounded |
| Pvt. Warren C. Timberlake | Co. D, 12th Ohio Infantry | Mortally Wounded |
| Cpl. Jacob Banker | Co. G, 12th Ohio Infantry | Mortally Wounded |
| Pvt. John R. Haven | Cotter’s Independent Ohio Battery | Mortally Wounded |
| Cpl. William Bishop | Co. K, 21st Ohio Infantry | Wounded |
| Pvt. James M. Miller | Co. K, 21st Ohio Infantry | Wounded |
| Capt. Joseph L. Hilt | Co. G, 12th Ohio Infantry | Wounded |
| Col. Jesse Norton | 21st Ohio Infantry | Wounded and captured |
| Lt. Brown | 12th Ohio Infantry | Captured |
| Col. Charles De Villiers | 11th Ohio Infantry | Captured |
| Col. William Woodruff | 2nd Kentucky Infantry | Captured |
| Lt-Col. George Neff | 2nd Kentucky Infantry | Captured |
| Capt. George Austin | 2nd Kentucky Infantry | Captured |
| Capt. John Hurd | 2nd Kentucky Infantry | Captured |

Known Confederate Casualties at Scary Creek
| Name | Regiment | Casualty |
|---|---|---|
| Col. George S. Patton | Kanawha Riflemen | Wounded |
| Lt. James Welch | Hale’s Kanawha Artillery | Killed |
| Unnamed Private | Hale’s Kanawha Artillery | Mortally wounded |
