= Daniel A. Dorsey =

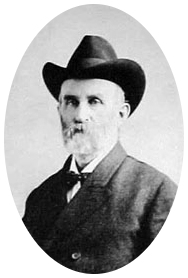
- Born: December 31, 1838; Lancaster, Ohio
- Died: May 10, 1918 (aged 79); Wadsworth, Kentucky
- Burial place: Leavenworth National Cemetery
- Military career
- Allegiance: United States of America
- Branch: United States Army
- Service years: 1861 - 1864
- Rank: First Lieutenant
- Unit: 33rd Ohio Volunteer Infantry Regiment - Company H
- Conflicts: Great Locomotive Chase
- Awards: Medal of Honor

Daniel Allen Dorsey (December 31, 1838 – May 10, 1918) was an American soldier who fought in the American Civil War. Dorsey received the country's highest award for bravery during combat, the Medal of Honor, for his action during the Great Locomotive Chase in Georgia in April 1862. He was honored with the award on 17 September 1863.

== Biography ==
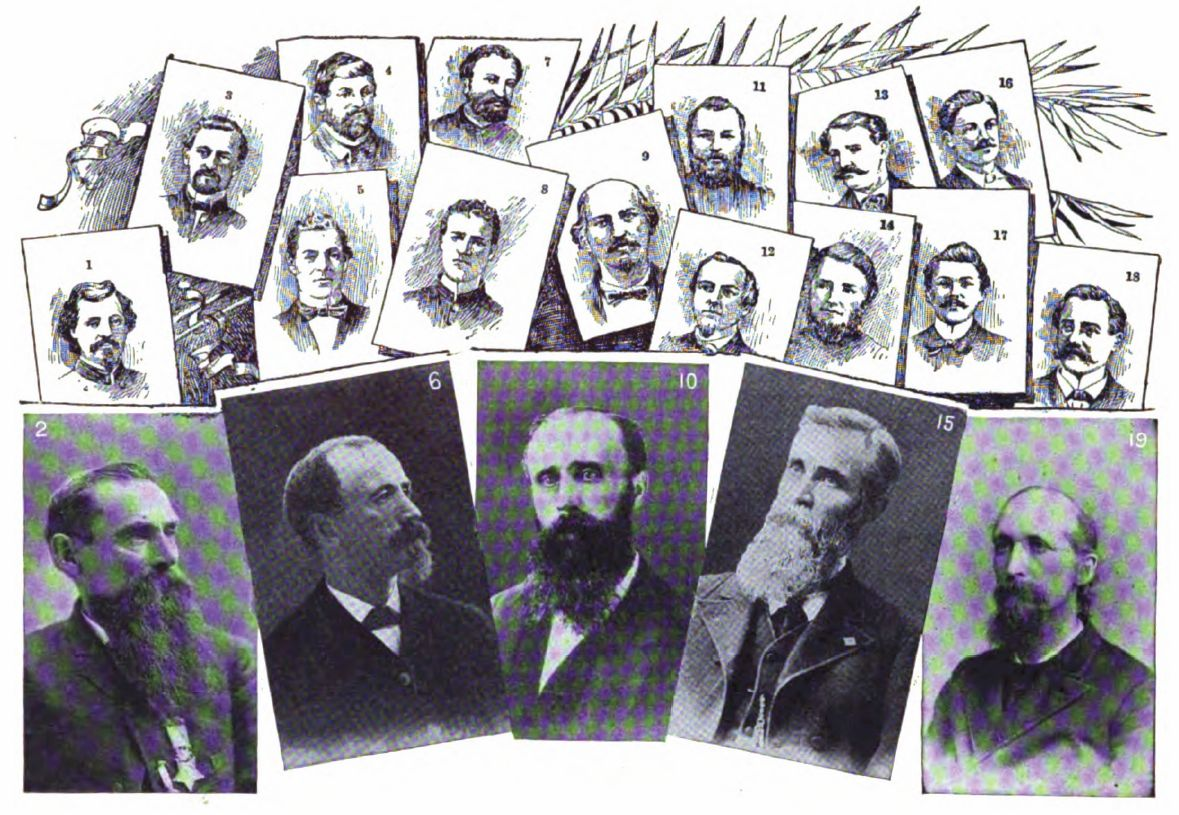
Andrew's Raiders - Daniel A. Dorsey is at #3 (Back row, 1st from left)

Dorsey was born on 31 December 1838 in Lancaster, Ohio, and joined the 33rd Ohio Volunteer Infantry at Portsmouth, Ohio, on 18 September 1861. Within a few months he was promoted to corporal, in November 1861. He was one of 22 men who took part in what later became known as the Great Locomotive Chase. The mission involved attempting to disrupt Confederate telegraph, bridge and rail communication. The men, known as Andrews' Raiders, under the direction of James J. Andrews, boarded a train in Georgia. On April 12, after the train had stopped in Big Shanty, they commandeered the train and headed for Chattanooga, Tennessee. While being pursued by the Confederates, they destroyed track and telegraph lines along the way. They abandoned the endeavor before reaching Chattanooga and were soon captured. Some of the men were hanged and others taken to prison camp. Dorsey, among those who had been captured, managed to escape from the Fulton County jail on 16 October 1862, rejoining his company soon afterwards.

After this event Dorsey was also involved in the Battle of Chickamauga in September 1863. He was commissioned as a second lieutenant in 1863 and then as a first lieutenant in 1864. He mustered out of the army on 24 August 1864, with disability.

Dorsey married Annie C. Miller shortly after leaving the army. They resided in Circleville, Ohio and produced six children together. He eventually separated from his family and died on May 10, 1918, in Kansas. His remains are interred at the Leavenworth National Cemetery.

== Medal of Honor citation ==
One of the 19 of 22 men (including 2 civilians) who, by direction of Gen. Mitchell (or Buell), penetrated nearly 200 miles south into enemy territory and captured a railroad train at Big Shanty, Ga., in an attempt to destroy the bridges and track between Chattanooga and Atlanta.

== See also ==
- List of American Civil War Medal of Honor recipients: A–F
- List of Andrews Raiders
