= McComb, Ohio =

- Village
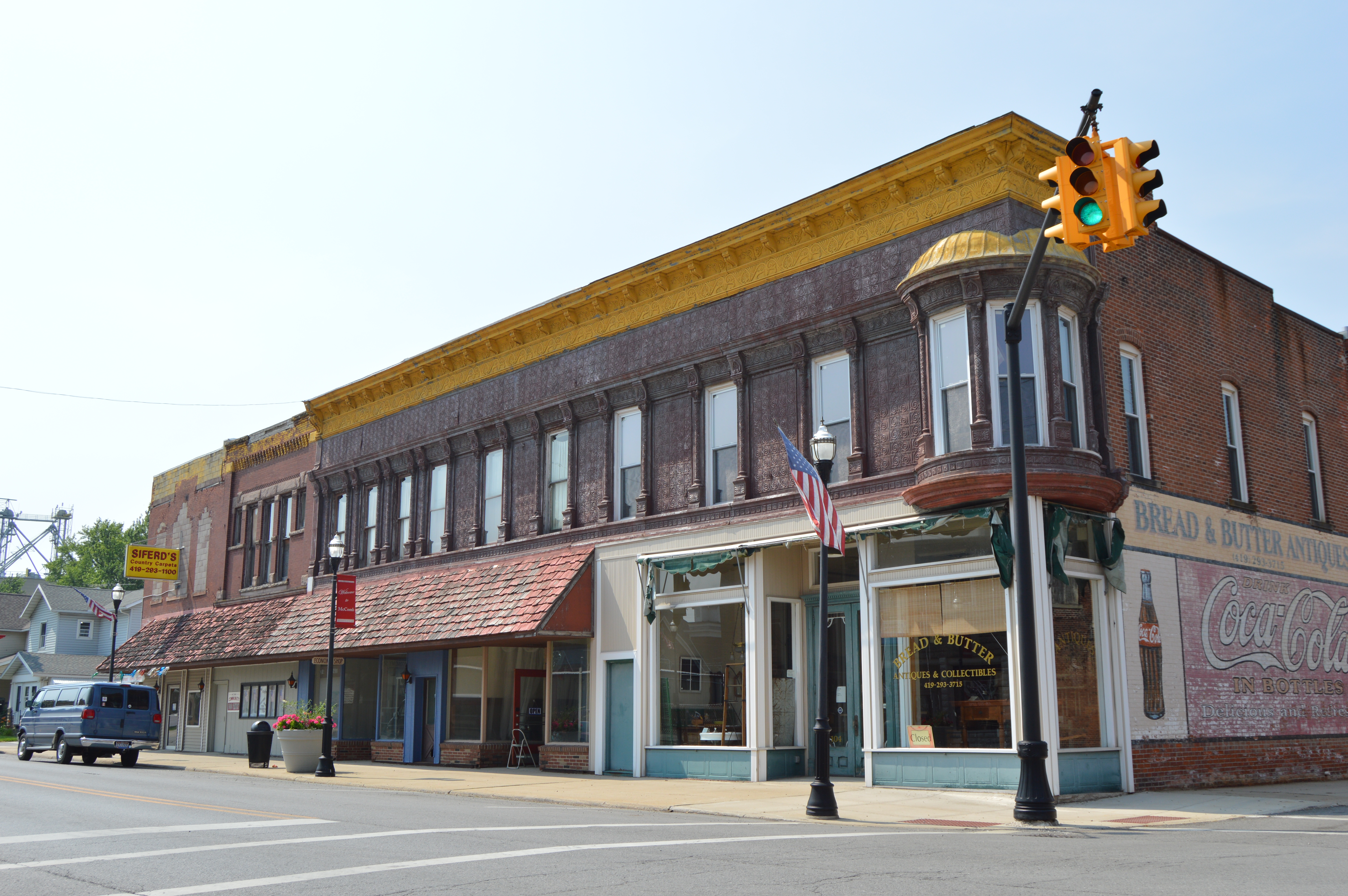
- Main Street downtown

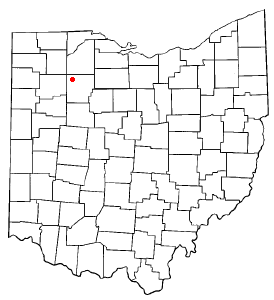
- Location of McComb, Ohio

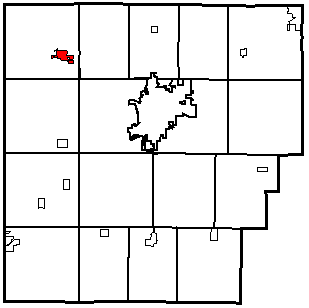
- Location within Hancock County
- Coordinates: 41°06′25″N 83°47′24″W
- Country: United States
- State: Ohio
- County: Hancock

Government
  - Type: Village Council
  - Mayor: Charles Latta

Area
  - Total: 1.08 sq mi (2.80 km^{2})
  - Land: 1.05 sq mi (2.71 km^{2})
  - Water: 0.035 sq mi (0.09 km^{2})
- Elevation: 768 ft (234 m)

Population (2020)
  - Total: 1,558
  - Density: 1,490.4/sq mi (575.45/km^{2})
- Time zone: UTC-5 (Eastern (EST))
  - Summer (DST): UTC-4 (EDT)
- ZIP code: 45858
- Area code: 419
- FIPS code: 39-45808
- GNIS feature ID: 2399287
- Website: www.villageofmccomb.com

McComb is a village in Hancock County, Ohio, United States. The population was 1,558 at the time of the 2020 census. The village holds one school district, McComb Local School District.

== History ==
McComb, originally known as Pleasantville, was laid out in 1847. The village was renamed McComb in 1858.

Despite its spelling, McComb is named for Alexander Macomb, who was the second man to serve as Commanding General of the United States Army. The reason for the spelling, "McComb" instead of "Macomb," is that the village was named by a Scotsman who fought under Macomb at the Battle of Plattsburg, and he used the Scottish manner of pronunciation and spelling.

William Bensinger and John Reed Porter among the first soldiers receive the Medal of Honor in American history for their role in the Great Locomotive Chase, are buried in McComb.

== Geography ==
McComb is located northwest of Findlay near the Putnam and Wood County borders.

According to the United States Census Bureau, the village has a total area of 0.93 square miles (2.41 km^{2}), of which 0.89 square miles (2.31 km^{2}) is land and 0.04 square miles (0.10 km^{2}) is water.

== Demographics ==
Historical population
Census	Pop.	Note	%±
1870	319		—
1880	417		30.7%
1890	1,030		147.0%
1900	1,195		16.0%
1910	1,088		−9.0%
1920	1,012		−7.0%
1930	932		−7.9%
1940	976		4.7%
1950	1,026		5.1%
1960	1,176		14.6%
1970	1,329		13.0%
1980	1,608		21.0%
1990	1,544		−4.0%
2000	1,676		8.5%
2010	1,648		−1.7%
2020	1,558		−5.5%
U.S. Decennial Census

=== 2010 census ===
As of the census of 2010, there were 1,648 people, 588 households, and 443 families residing in the village. The population density was 1,851.7 inhabitants per square mile (714.9/km^{2}). There were 656 housing units at an average density of 737.1 per square mile (284.6/km^{2}). The racial makeup of the village was 93.9% White, 0.4% African American, 0.4% Native American, 0.7% Asian, 2.1% from other races, and 2.4% from two or more races. Hispanic or Latino of any race were 8.9% of the population.

There were 588 households, of which 44.0% had children under the age of 18 living with them, 53.9% were married couples living together, 14.3% had a female householder with no husband present, 7.1% had a male householder with no wife present, and 24.7% were non-families. 19.9% of all households were made up of individuals, and 9.3% had someone living alone who was 65 years of age or older. The average household size was 2.80 and the average family size was 3.19.

The median age in the village was 34.8 years. 30.6% of residents were under the age of 18; 9.4% were between the ages of 18 and 24; 25% were from 25 to 44; 24.7% were from 45 to 64; and 10.4% were 65 years of age or older. The gender makeup of the village was 48.8% male and 51.2% female.

=== 2000 census ===
As of the census of 2000, there were 1,676 people, 587 households, and 466 families residing in the village. The population density was 1,835.3 inhabitants per square mile (708.6/km^{2}). There were 633 housing units at an average density of 693.2 per square mile (267.6/km^{2}). The racial makeup of the village was 96.24% White, 0.24% African American, 0.12% Native American, 0.60% Asian, 0.89% from other races, and 1.91% from two or more races. Hispanic or Latino of any race were 3.58% of the population.

There were 587 households, out of which 44.8% had children under the age of 18 living with them, 60.5% were married couples living together, 14.1% had a female householder with no husband present, and 20.6% were non-families. 17.9% of all households were made up of individuals, and 6.6% had someone living alone who was 65 years of age or older. The average household size was 2.86 and the average family size was 3.19.

In the village, the population was spread out, with 33.9% under the age of 18, 6.7% from 18 to 24, 31.0% from 25 to 44, 19.6% from 45 to 64, and 8.8% who were 65 years of age or older. The median age was 31 years. For every 100 females there were 97.2 males. For every 100 females age 18 and over, there were 92.2 males.

The median income for a household in the village was $40,688, and the median income for a family was $43,333. Males had a median income of $31,189 versus $23,512 for females. The per capita income for the village was $17,043. About 7.6% of families and 8.6% of the population were below the poverty line, including 11.3% of those under age 18 and 7.7% of those age 65 or over.

== Education ==
The McComb Local School system is a K-12 grade school. The schools in represented by its mascot the black panther with a colors of red and black. In total, the school has an enrollment number of 255 students.

Up until 2013, the main building in the village of McComb only housed K-5 and 9-12. The junior high school was located nearby in Hoytville, Ohio. In 2013, the school merged the main building with the junior high.
