= John Morehead Scott =

Medal of Honor recipient (1839–1862)

Sergeant John Morehead Scott
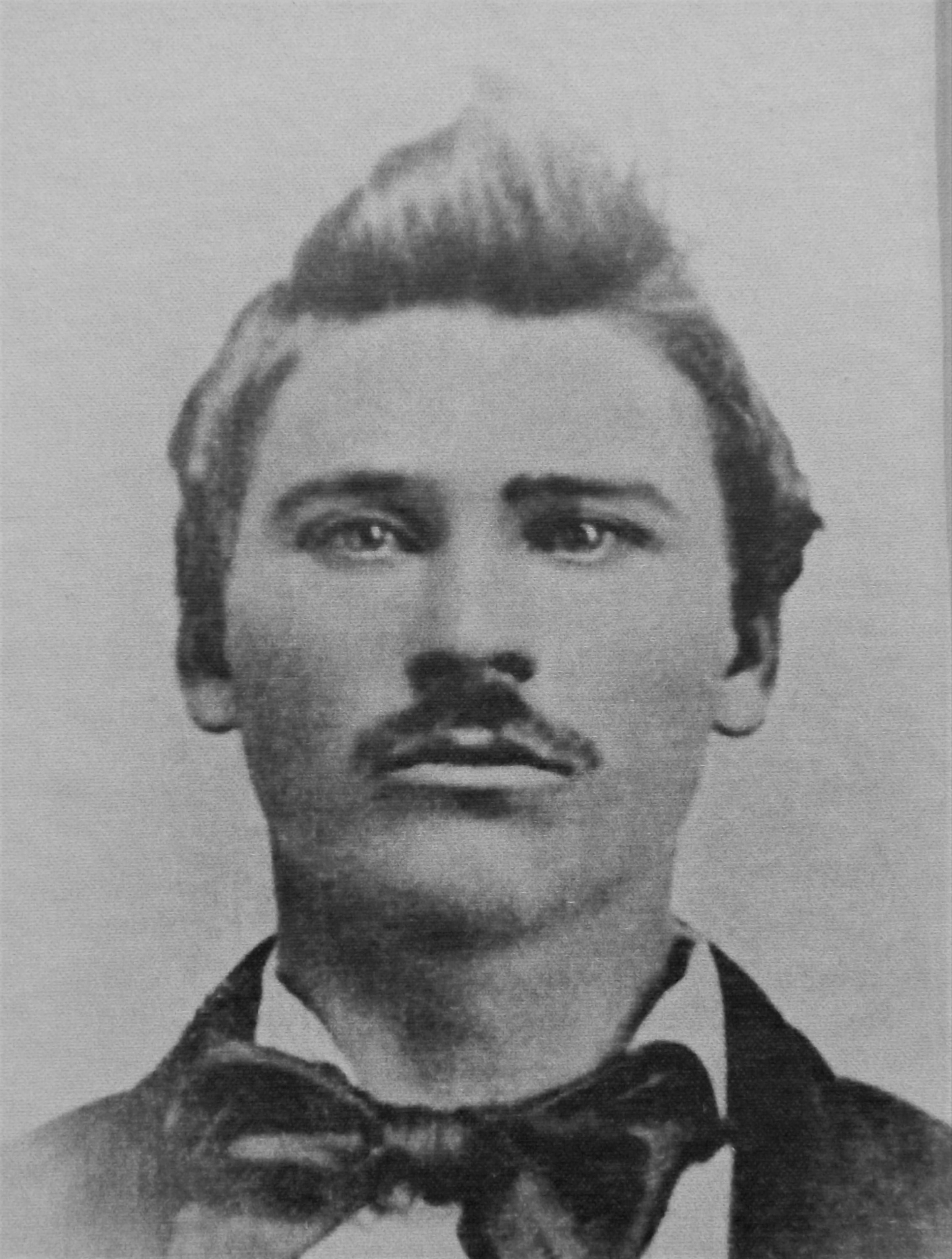
- Born: January 1, 1839; Stark County, Ohio, U.S.
- Died: June 18, 1862 (aged 23); Atlanta, Georgia, U.S.
- Burial place: Chattanooga National Cemetery, Chattanooga, Tennessee, U.S.
- Military career
- Allegiance: United States
- Branch: United States Army
- Service years: 1861–1862
- Rank: Sergeant
- Units: Company F, 21st Ohio Infantry
- Conflicts: American Civil War (POW); The Great Locomotive Chase (executed)
- Awards: Medal of Honor

John Morehead Scott (1 January 1839 – 18 June 1862) was a sergeant in the United States Army who was awarded the Medal of Honor for gallantry during the American Civil War. Scott was awarded the medal posthumously on 27 April 1865 for actions performed during the Great Locomotive Chase on 12 April 1862.

== Personal life ==
Scott was born in Stark County, Ohio, on 1 January 1839 to parents Thomas B. Scott and Elizabeth Moorehead Scott, one of six children. He married Rachel M. Davis Waggoner in 1861. Following the Great Locomotive Chase, Scott was hanged along with 7 others in Atlanta, Georgia and was buried in Marietta National Cemetery. He was later reburied in Chattanooga National Cemetery.

== Military service ==
Scott enlisted in the Army as a sergeant on 6 September 1861 at Findlay, Ohio. He was mustered into Company F of the 21st Ohio Infantry on 19 September 1861. He was one of seven men executed by the Confederates for espionage. He was posthumously awarded the Medal of Honor on August 4, 1866.

Scott's Medal of Honor citation reads:

The President of the United States of America, in the name of Congress, takes pride in presenting the Medal of Honor (Posthumously) to Sergeant John Morehead Scott, United States Army, for extraordinary heroism on April, 1862, while serving with Company G, 21st Ohio Infantry, in action during the Andrew's Raid in Georgia. Sergeant Scott was one of the 19 of 22 men (including two civilians) who, by direction of General Mitchell (or Buell), penetrated nearly 200 miles south into enemy territory and captured a railroad train at Big Shanty, Georgia, and attempted to destroy the bridges and track between Chattanooga and Atlanta.

— E. M. Stanton, Secretary of War
