= John Wollam =

Part of the Great Locomotive Chase and recipient of the Medal of Honor

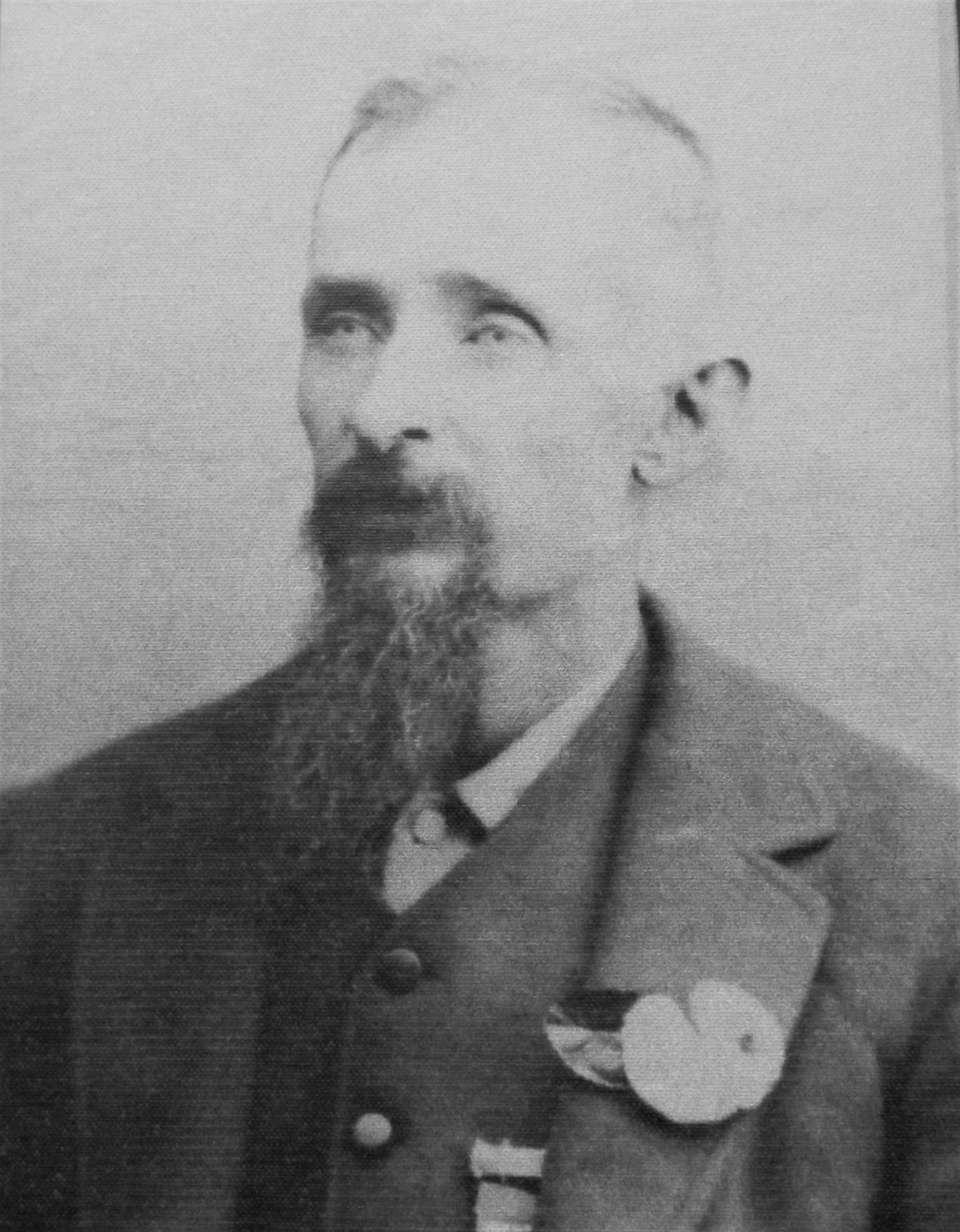
John Wollam

John Wollam (1838 - September 27, 1890) was a participant in the Great Locomotive Chase and recipient of the Medal of Honor.

== Biography ==
John Wollam was born in 1838 in Hamilton, Ohio. He served as a private in the 21st Ohio Infantry. He was a participant in the Great Locomotive Chase and thus was one of the first soldiers to receive the medal. His received his medal on July 20, 1864. He died on September 27, 1890, and is buried in Fairmount Cemetery, Jackson, Ohio.

== Medal of Honor Citation ==
For extraordinary heroism on April, 1862, in action during the Andrew's Raid in Georgia. Private Wollam was one of the 19 of 22 men (including two civilians) who, by direction of General Mitchell (or Buell), penetrated nearly 200 miles/200 miles (320 km) south into enemy territory and captured a railroad train at Big Shanty, Georgia, and attempted to destroy the bridges and track between Chattanooga and Atlanta.
