= Marion A. Ross =

Medal of Honor recipient

Sergeant Major Marion A. Ross
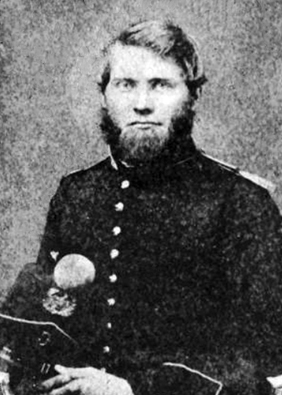
- Born: October 9, 1832; Addison (modern day Christiansburg, Ohio)
- Died: June 18, 1862 (aged 29); Atlanta, Georgia
- Burial place: Chattanooga National Cemetery, Chattanooga, Tennessee
- Military career
- Allegiance: United States
- Branch: Army
- Service years: 1861-1862
- Rank: Sergeant Major
- Unit: 2nd Ohio Infantry
- Conflicts: American Civil War: The Great Locomotive Chase
- Awards: Medal of Honor

Marion A. Ross (October 9, 1832 – June 18, 1862) was a sergeant major of the United States Army who was awarded the Medal of Honor for gallantry during the American Civil War. He was posthumously awarded the medal in September 1863 for actions performed during the Great Locomotive Chase in April 1862.

== Personal life ==
Ross was born on a farm on 9 October 1832 in Addison (modern day Christiansburg, Ohio) to parents Levi and Mary Ross. He was one of seven children. He enrolled in the Antioch Preparatory Academy in 1853, but took 1855-1859 off from school. At the beginning of the war, he was a student at Antioch College. He was hanged as a spy in Atlanta, Georgia on 18 June 1862 and is buried in Chattanooga National Cemetery in Chattanooga, Tennessee.

== Military service ==
Ross enlisted in the Army as a private on 17 April 1861 in Christiansburg. He was assigned to Company F of the 2nd Ohio Infantry and was stationed in Camp McClelland in Philadelphia, Pennsylvania. He was mustered out on 31 July 1861, but reenlisted into Company A of the 2nd Ohio Infantry on 20 August 1861. On 7 December 1861, after catching the attention of General Ormsby Mitchel, he was promoted to sergeant major and was assigned to the Secret Service, a group of 24 men led by Captain James J. Andrews, which met in Shelbyville, Tennessee.

The goal of this group was to perform a raid on Confederate communications and transportation by hijacking a Confederate train, in what was later deemed the Great Locomotive Chase. Ross and his compatriots posed as Kentuckians on their way south to join the Confederacy and, while the train operators were out for breakfast, steal the train and drive it back to Union lines. However, due to a large Confederate presence in the area, their plan ultimately failed and Ross was captured. He was executed as a spy on 18 June 1862 in Atlanta, Georgia.

Ross was posthumously awarded the Medal of Honor. His Medal of Honor citation reads:

The President of the United States of America, in the name of Congress, takes pride in presenting the Medal of Honor (Posthumously) to Sergeant Major Marion A. Ross, United States Army, for extraordinary heroism on April, 1862, while serving with Company G, 21st Ohio Infantry, in action during the Andrew's Raid in Georgia. Sergeant Major Ross was one of 19 of 22 men (including two civilians) who, by direction of General Mitchell (or Buell), penetrated nearly 200 miles south into the enemy's territory and captured a railroad train at Big Shanty, Georgia, in an attempt to destroy the bridges and track between Chattanooga and Atlanta.

— E. M. Stanton, Secretary of War
