= Mark Wood (Medal of Honor) =

Medal of Honor recipient (1839–1866)

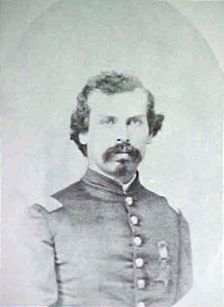
- Born: September 22, 1839; Nottingham, England
- Died: July 11, 1866 (aged 26); Toledo, Ohio
- Burial place: Toledo, Ohio
- Military career
- Allegiance: United States of America
- Branch: United States Army
- Service years: 1861 - 1864
- Rank: Second Lieutenant
- Units: Company C, 21st Ohio Infantry
- Conflicts: Great Locomotive Chase; American Civil War
- Awards: Medal of Honor

Mark Wood (September 22, 1839 – July 11, 1866) was an American soldier who fought in the American Civil War. Wood received his country's highest award for bravery during combat, the Medal of Honor, for his role in the celebrated Great Locomotive Chase. Wood and a fellow participant in the raid, John A. Wilson, were captured close to Union lines in Stevenson, Alabama after they abandoned The General. Wood and Wilson escaped from captivity and after sailing down the Chattahoochee River, were rescued by a Union ship. He was honored with the award on May 12, 1865.

Wood joined the Army from Portage, Ohio in August 1861. He was captured a second time at the Battle of Chickamauga, but paroled several days later. He was commissioned as a Second Lieutenant in March 1864, and discharged due to disability the following November. Wood was buried in Toledo, Ohio.

== Medal of Honor citation ==
The President of the United States of America, in the name of Congress, takes pleasure in presenting the Medal of Honor to Private Mark Wood, United States Army, for extraordinary heroism in April 1862, while serving with Company G, 21st Ohio Infantry, in action during the Andrew's Raid in Georgia. Private Wood was one of the 19 of 22 men (including two civilians), who, by direction of General Mitchell (or Buell), penetrated nearly 200 miles south into enemy territory and captured a railroad train at Big Shanty, Georgia, and attempted to destroy the bridges and track between Chattanooga and Atlanta.

== See also ==
- Great Locomotive Chase
- List of Andrews Raiders
- List of American Civil War Medal of Honor recipients: T–Z
