= Robert Buffum =

American Civil War veteran and Medal of Honor recipient

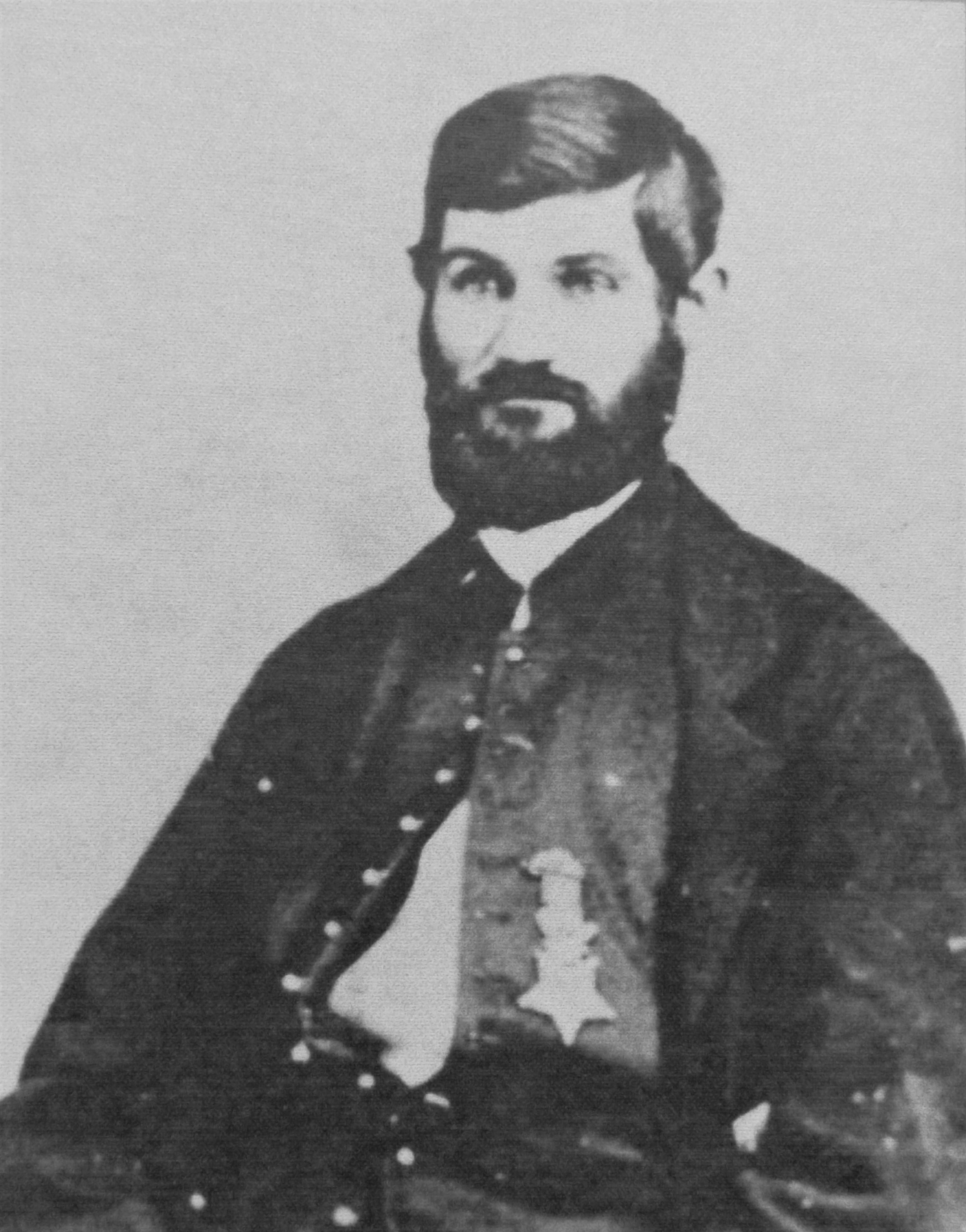
- Born: July 7, 1828; Salem, Massachusetts
- Died: July 20, 1871 (aged 43); Auburn, New York
- Military career
- Allegiance: United States of America
- Branch: United States Army
- Service years: 1861–1864
- Rank: Second Lieutenant
- Unit: 21st Regiment Ohio Volunteer Infantry - Company H
- Conflicts: Great Locomotive Chase
- Awards: Medal of Honor

Robert Buffum (July 7, 1828 to July 20, 1871) was an American soldier who fought in the American Civil War. Buffum was the third person to receive the country's highest award for bravery during combat, the Medal of Honor, for his action during the Great Locomotive Chase in Georgia (U.S. state) in April 1862. He was honored with the award on 25 March 1863.

== Biography ==
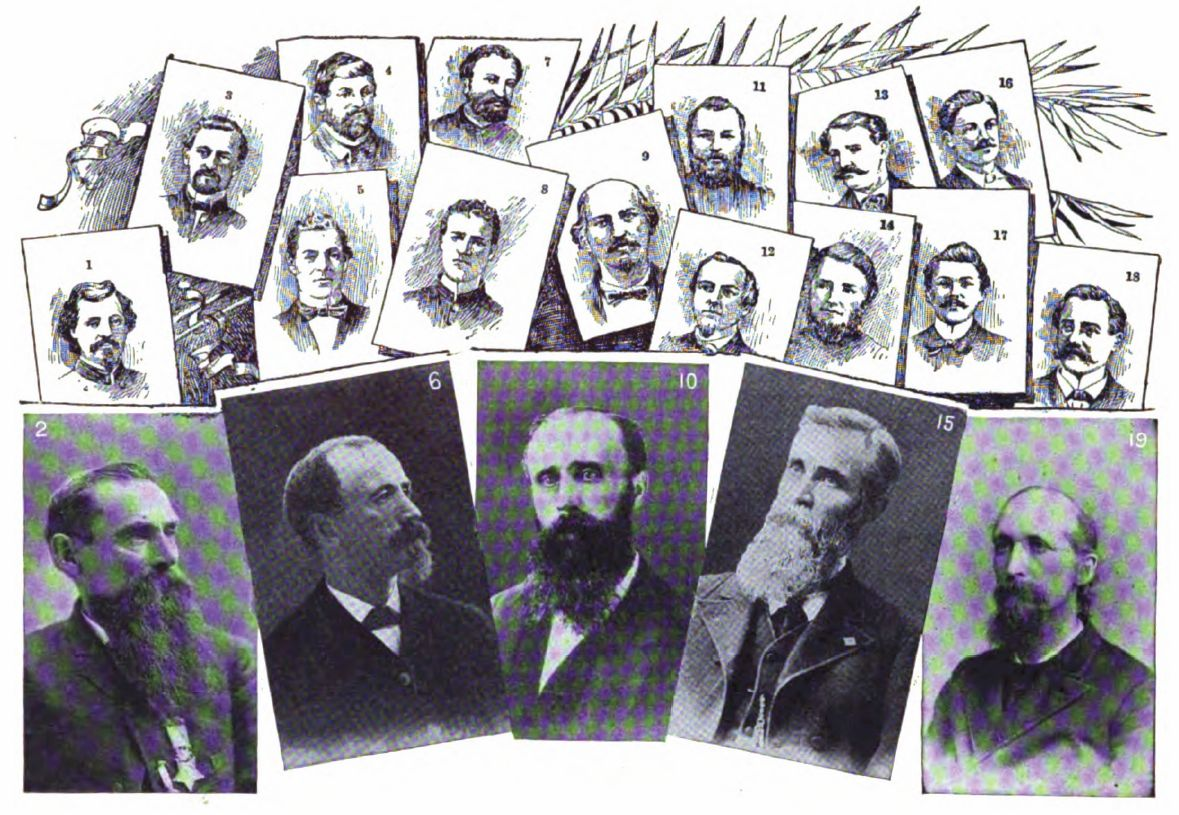
Andrew's Raiders - Robert Buffum is at #4 (Top row, 1st(2nd) from left)

Buffum was born on July 7, 1828, in Salem, Massachusetts and enlisted into the 21st Ohio Infantry at Gilead, Ohio on September 2, 1861. He was among a group of Ohio men (19 soldiers and 2 civilians) who volunteered to participate in a secret mission to disrupt Confederate communication. In April the group, led by James J. Andrews, which later came to be called Andrews' Raiders, boarded a train in Georgia. On April 12, after the train had stopped in Big Shanty, they commandeered the train's engine and three boxcars and headed towards Chattanooga, Tennessee. Under pursuit from the Confederates, they destroyed track and telegraph lines along the way. They never made it to Chattanooga but abandoned the engine. They were all captured within a week. Some of the men were hanged. Buffum was taken as a prisoner of war, but was eventually exchanged on 17 March 1863.

Buffum died on July 20, 1871. His remains are interred in Auburn, New York.

== Medal of Honor citation ==
One of the 19 of 22 men (including 2 civilians) who, by direction of Gen. Mitchell (or Buell), penetrated nearly 200 miles south into enemy territory and captured a railroad train at Big Shanty, Ga., in an attempt to destroy the bridges and track between Chattanooga and Atlanta.

== See also ==
- Great Locomotive Chase
- List of Andrews Raiders
- List of American Civil War Medal of Honor recipients: A–F
