= John Reed Porter =

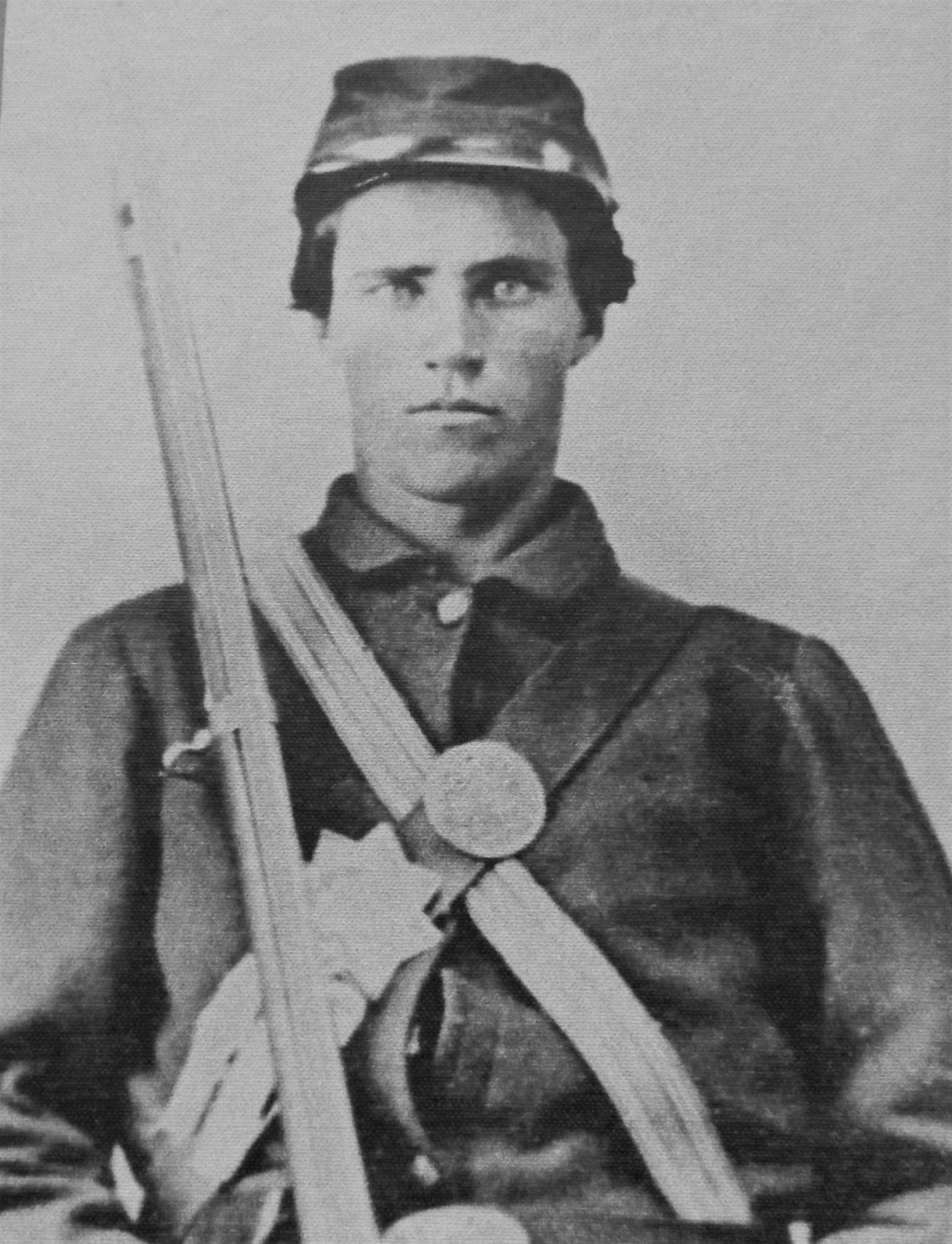
- Porter in 1870
- Born: November 14, 1838; Delaware County, Ohio, US
- Died: October 15, 1923 (aged 84); Dayton, Ohio, US
- Military career
- Allegiance: United States
- Branch: United States Army Union Army (POW)
- Service years: 1861 – 1865
- Rank: 1st Lieutenant
- Units: Company G, 21st Ohio Infantry
- Conflicts: American Civil War: Battle of Scary Creek; Battle of Stones River; Battle of Chickamauga; Chattanooga campaign; Atlanta campaign; Battle of Bentonville
- Awards: Medal of Honor

John Reed Porter (November 14, 1838 – October 15, 1923) was a recipient of the Medal of Honor, a military award presented by the United States Department of War to 18 Union Army soldiers who participated in the Great Locomotive Chase in 1862 during the American Civil War (1861–1865). He joined Union Army in 1861 and participated in the battles of Chickamauga, Stones River, Bentonville, and the campaigns of Chattanooga and Atlanta. At the end of the war he was a first lieutenant.

== Biography ==
Porter was a native of Delaware County, Ohio. He joined the United States Army in 1861 as a private in Company G, 21st Ohio Infantry. In April 1862, he was to take part in a daring raid with 21 others (later known as "Andrews' Raiders" because they operated under the command of James J. Andrews). He overslept and missed out on the raid but was captured and imprisoned along with his fellow raiders within two weeks. Porter and 14 others managed to escape, but only six of them reached friendly lines. Porter was one of the six who managed to reach Union held territory. He served with the Union Army for the remainder of the war and was commissioned as a second lieutenant. By the war's end he was promoted to first lieutenant. Following the war, he returned to Ohio and was the last raider to die in 1923.

== Medal of Honor citation ==

Rank and Organization:

Rank and Organization: Private, Company G, 21st Ohio Infantry. Place and Date: Georgia, April 1862. Entered Service At: Findlay, Ohio. Born: 14 November 1838, Delaware County, Ohio. Date Of Issue: September 1863.

Citation:

One of the 19 of 22 men (including 2 civilians) who, by direction of Gen. Mitchell (or Buell), penetrated nearly 200 miles south into enemy territory and captured a railroad train at Big Shanty, Ga., in an attempt to destroy the bridges and track between Chattanooga and Atlanta.

== See also ==
- List of American Civil War Medal of Honor recipients: M–P
- List of Andrews Raiders
