= Elihu H. Mason =

Union Army Medal of Honor recipient

Elihu Harlam Mason
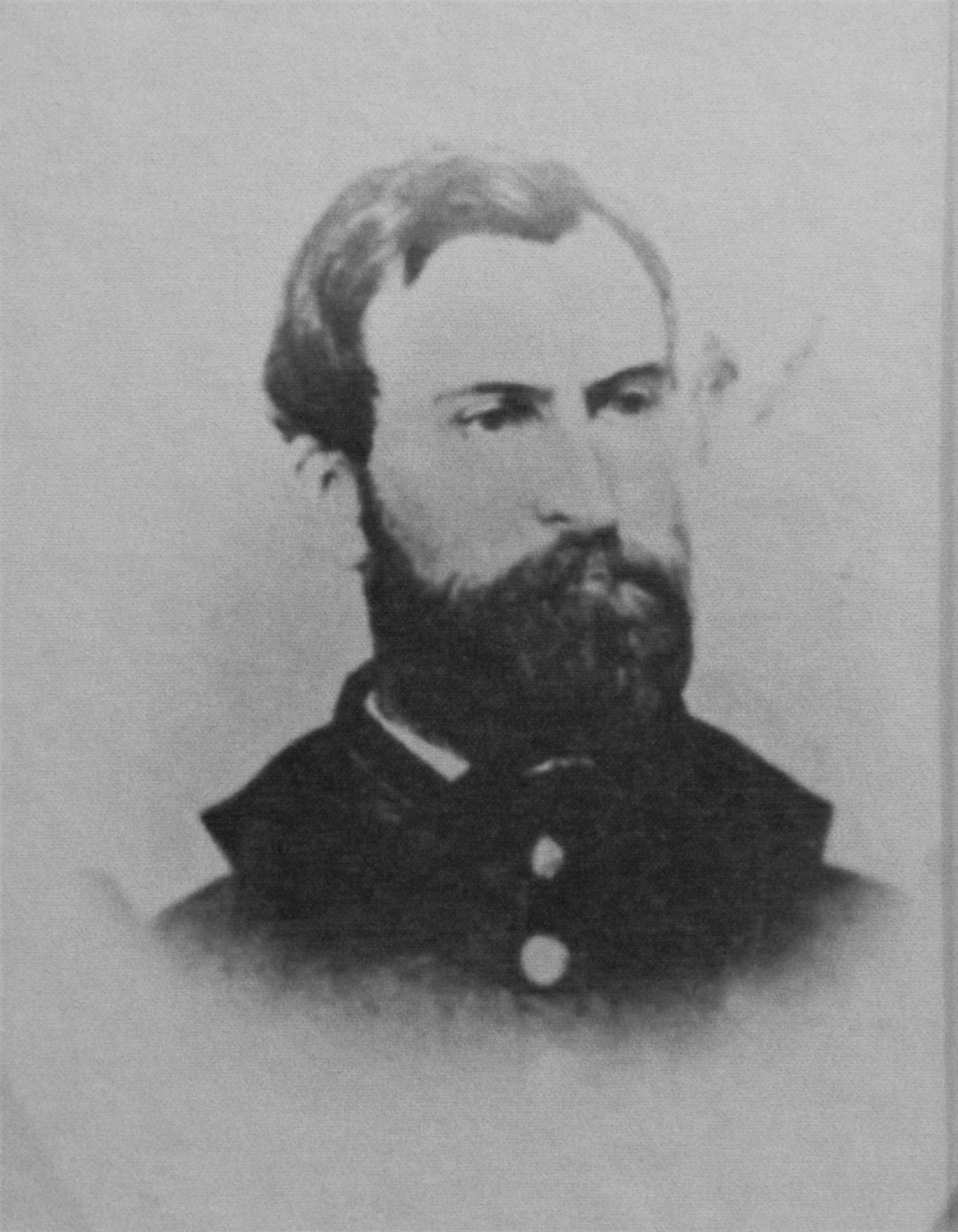
- Elihu H. Mason
- Born: March 23, 1831; Richmond, Indiana, US
- Died: September 24, 1896 (aged 65); Pemberville, Ohio, US
- Burial place: Pemberville Cemetery, Pemberville, Ohio, US
- Military career
- Allegiance: United States; Union
- Branch: US Army; Union Army
- Service years: 1861 - 1865
- Rank: Captain
- Unit: 21st Ohio Infantry
- Conflicts: American Civil War • Great Locomotive Chase
- Awards: Medal of Honor

Elihu Harlam Mason (March 23, 1831 – September 24, 1896) was a Union Army soldier in the American Civil War and a recipient of the United States military's highest decoration, the Medal of Honor, for his actions in the Great Locomotive Chase.

== Biography ==
Mason joined the Army from Pemberville, Ohio, in April 1861. By April 1862, he was serving as a sergeant in Company K of the 21st Ohio Infantry. During that month, he volunteered for a raid into Confederate territory to disrupt rail transport in Georgia. The mission failed, and all of the raiders were captured. In June, eight of the men, including the raid leader, James J. Andrews, were executed as spies. The remaining raiders, including Mason, made an escape from the Confederate prison on October 16, 1862. Very ill at the time, Mason was unable to keep up with the other soldiers and, at his own urging, was eventually left behind and recaptured by the Confederates. He and five other recaptured raiders were released in a prisoner exchange the next year, on March 18. For his actions during the mission, he was awarded the newly created Medal of Honor one week after being exchanged, on March 25, 1863. He was the fourth person ever to receive the medal.

Mason later became a commissioned officer and reached the rank of captain. He fought in the Battle of Chickamauga, where he was again captured by the Confederates. He was paroled in December 1864 and discharged in May 1865.

After the war, Mason returned to Pemberville, Ohio. He died at age 65.

== Medal of Honor citation ==
Mason's official Medal of Honor citation reads:

One of the 19 of 22 men (including 2 civilians) who, by direction of Gen. Mitchell (or Buell), penetrated nearly 200 miles south into enemy territory and captured a railroad train at Big Shanty, Ga., in an attempt to destroy the bridges and track between Chattanooga and Atlanta.

== See also ==
- List of American Civil War Medal of Honor recipients: A–F
- List of Andrews Raiders
