= William Bensinger =

American Civil War soldier awarded the Medal of Honor

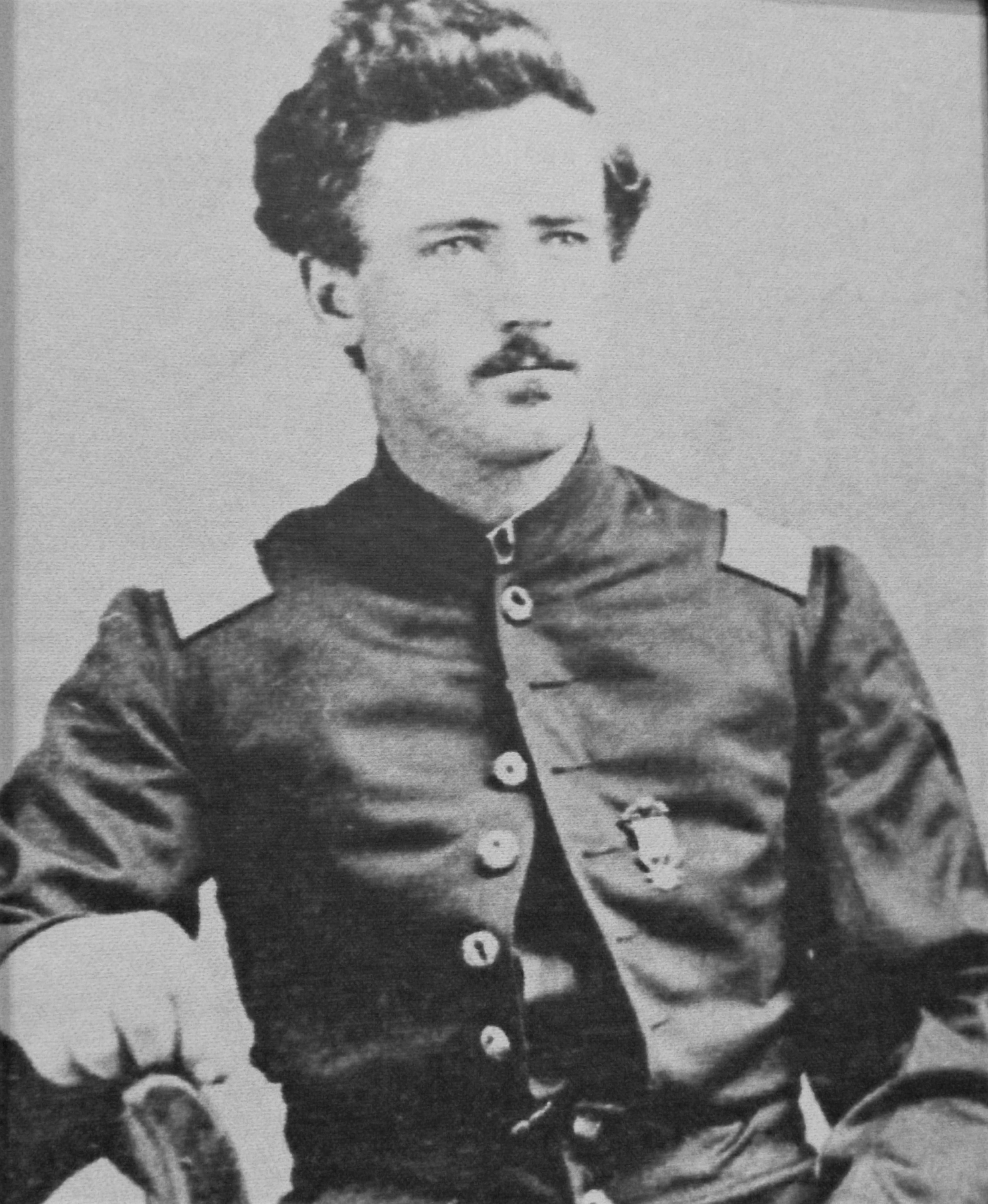
- Born: January 14, 1840; Waynesburg, Ohio
- Died: December 19, 1918 (aged 78); McComb, Ohio
- Military career
- Allegiance: United States of America
- Branch: United States Army
- Service years: 1861 - 1866
- Rank: Captain
- Unit: 21st Regiment Ohio Volunteer Infantry - Company G
- Conflicts: Great Locomotive Chase
- Awards: Medal of Honor

William Bensinger (January 14, 1840, to December 19, 1918) was an American soldier who fought for the Union in the American Civil War. On March 25, 1863, he was the second person given the country's highest award for bravery during combat, the Medal of Honor, for his actions during the Great Locomotive Chase in Georgia in April 1862.

== Biography ==
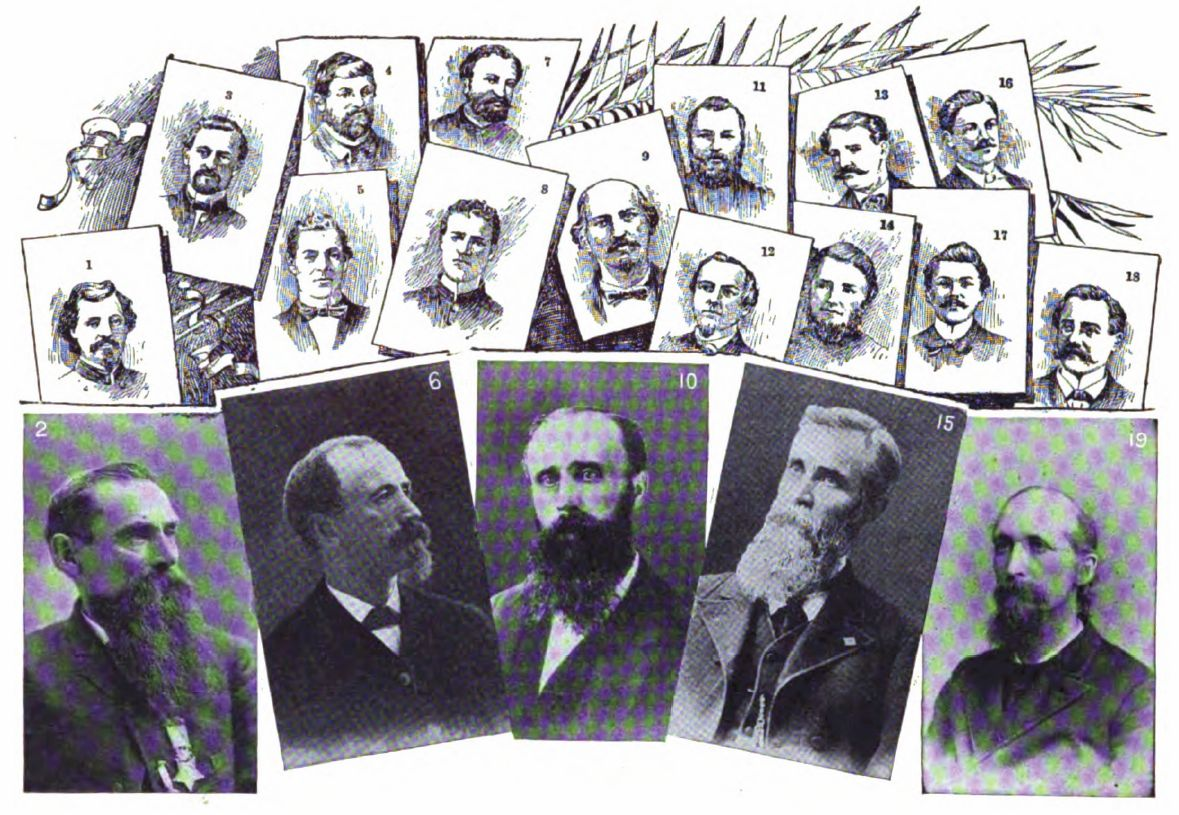
Andrew's Raiders - William Bensinger is at #6 (Front row, 2nd from left)

Bensinger was born on January 14, 1840, in Waynesburg, Ohio, and enlisted into the 21st Ohio Infantry at Hancock County, Ohio. He was among a group of Ohio men (19 soldiers and 2 civilians) who volunteered for a secret mission to disrupt Confederate communication. In April, this group led by James J. Andrews, which later came to be called Andrews' Raiders, boarded a train in Georgia. On April 12, after it stopped in Big Shanty, they commandeered its engine and three boxcars and headed toward Chattanooga, Tennessee. Pursued by the Confederates, they destroyed track and telegraph lines along the way. They never made it to Chattanooga and abandoned the engine, before all were captured within a week. Some were hanged and some, including Bensinger, were taken to prison camp. He eventually escaped and arrived in Washington, D.C., later moving to McComb, Ohio, where he died on December 19, 1918.

== Medal of Honor citation ==
One of the 19 of 22 men (including 2 civilians) who, by direction of Gen. Mitchell (or Buell), penetrated nearly 200 miles south into enemy territory and captured a railroad train at Big Shanty, Ga., in an attempt to destroy the bridges and track between Chattanooga and Atlanta.

== See also ==
- Great Locomotive Chase
- List of Andrews Raiders
- List of American Civil War Medal of Honor recipients: A–F
