= William H. Reddick =

American Civil War Medal of Honor recipient

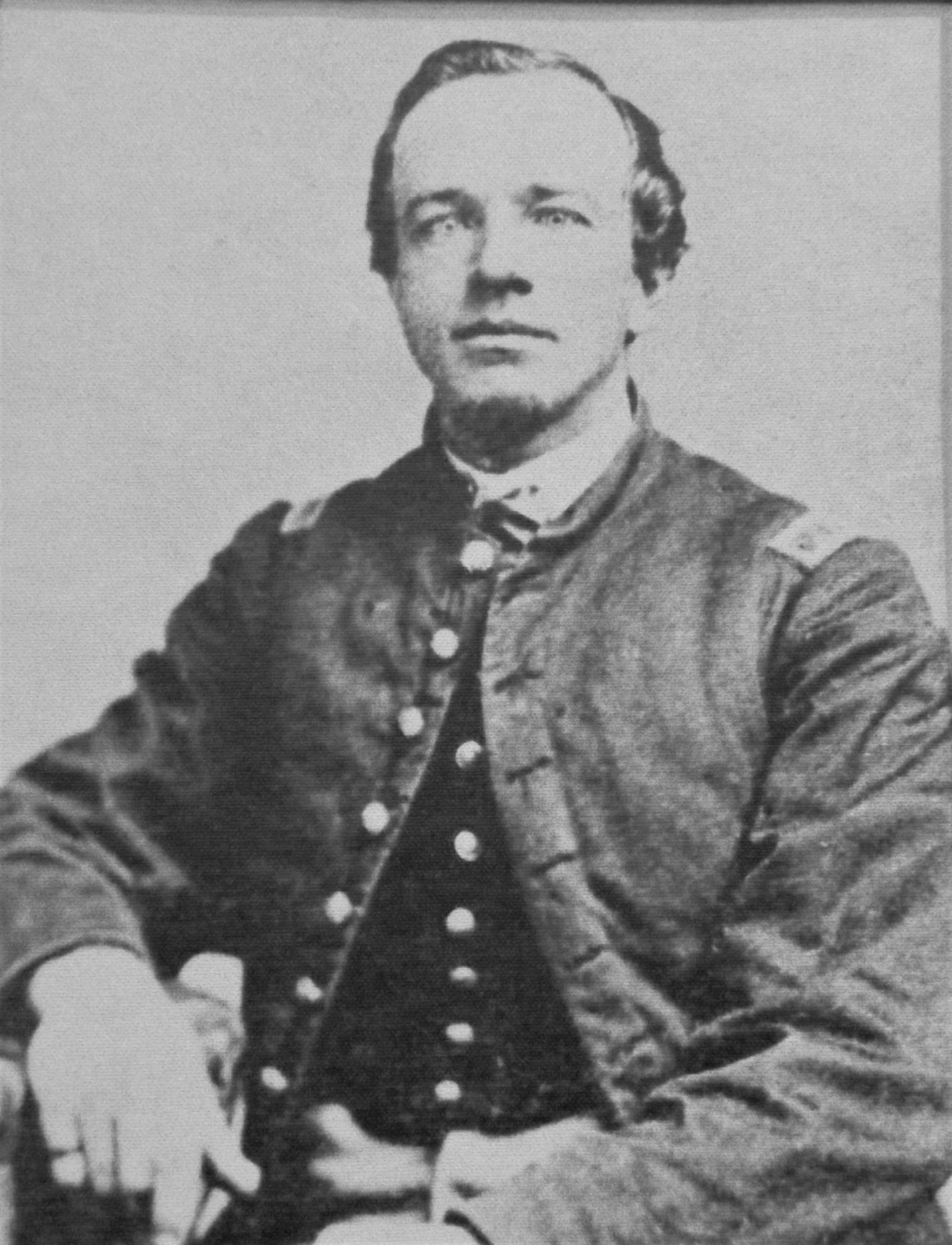
William H. Reddick

William Henry Harrison Reddick (1840–1903) was an American Civil War soldier and Medal of Honor recipient. He received the Medal of Honor for his actions during the Andrews Raid, also known as the Great Locomotive Chase or the Mitchell Raid. Reddick was born on September 18, 1840, in Locust Grove, Ohio, and died on November 8, 1903, in Muscatine, Iowa. He is buried at the Lettsville Cemetery in Letts, Iowa. He worked as a farmer after his discharge from the military.

== Military service ==
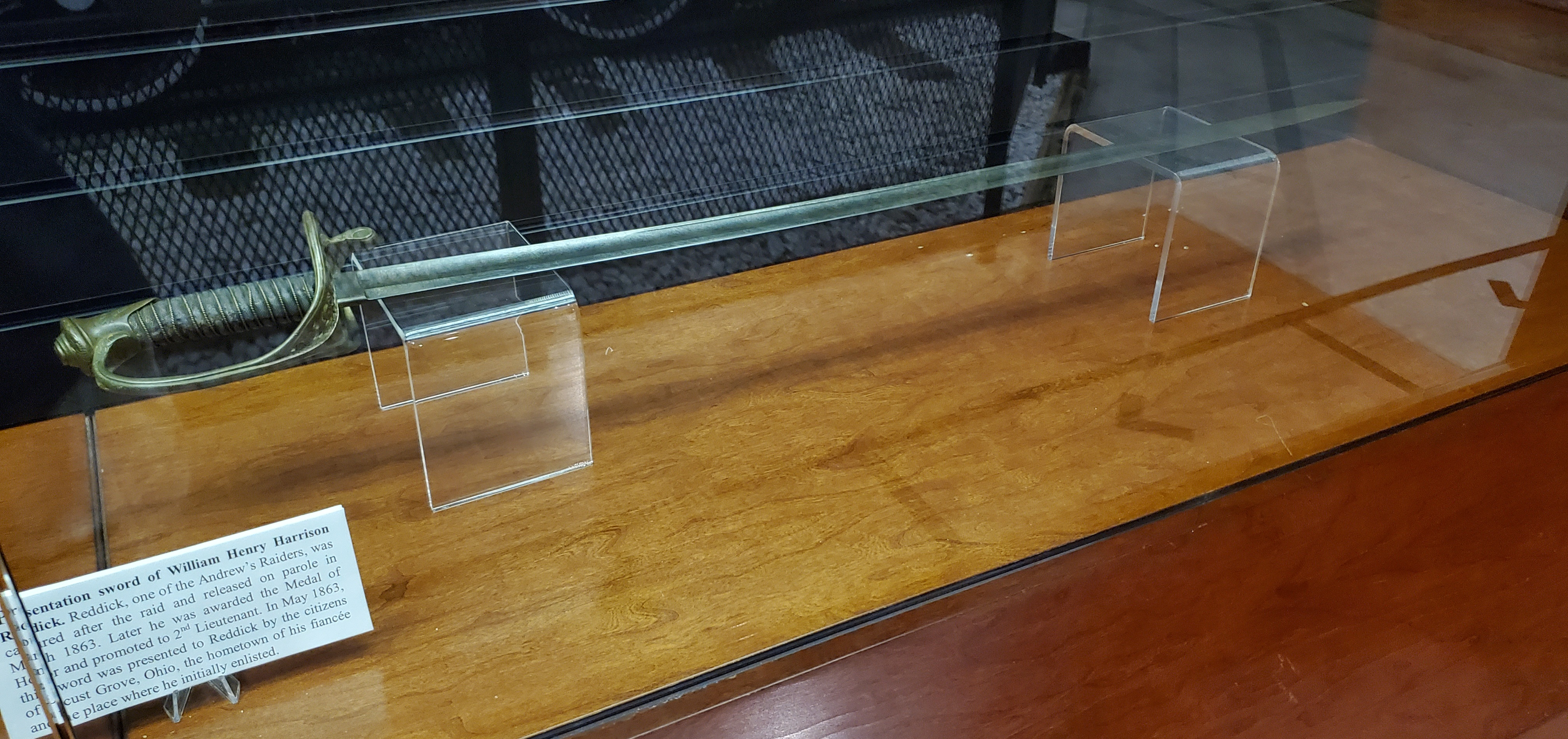
Ceremonial sword presented to Reddick by citizens of Locust Grove

William H. Reddick enlisted with the 33rd Ohio Infantry on August 18, 1861. In the spring of 1862, he volunteered to join a group selected from three Ohio regiments by James J. Andrews. Their mission was to steal a train in Georgia and destroy railway facilities. The operation ultimately was unsuccessful, and Reddick was imprisoned in Atlanta, along with thirteen of the other raiders (Andrews and seven others were executed.) He attempted to escape in October 1862, but was recaptured and sent to Castle Thunder Prison in Richmond, Virginia, in December 1862. After a prisoner exchange in March 1863, he traveled to Washington, D.C., where he and five of his fellow raiders received the Medal of Honor. They were the first recipients of the medal.

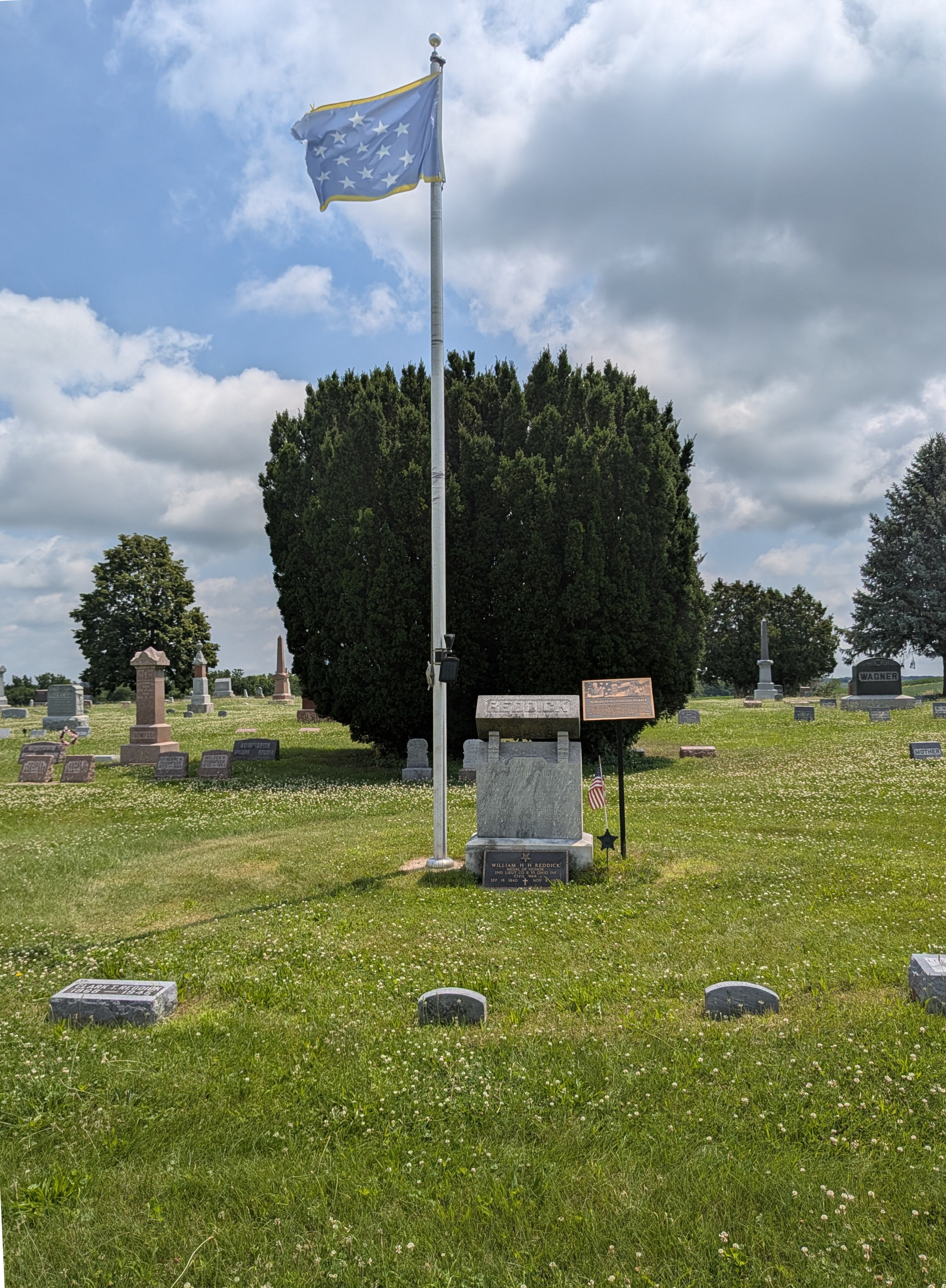
Gravesite in Letts, Iowa

== Medal of Honor citation ==
Reddick was awarded the Medal of Honor on March 25, 1863, for his actions in April 1862. He was the sixth individual to receive the medal. The citation reads:

The President of the United States of America, in the name of Congress, takes pleasure in presenting the Medal of Honor to Corporal William Henry Harrison Reddick, United States Army, for extraordinary heroism on April, 1862, while serving with Company G, 21st Ohio Infantry, in action during the Andrew's Raid in Georgia. Corporal Reddick was one of the 19 of 22 men (including two civilians) who, by direction of General Mitchell (or Buell), penetrated nearly 200 miles south into enemy territory and captured a railroad train at Big Shanty, Georgia, in an attempt to destroy the bridges and tracks between Chattanooga and Atlanta.
