= John Alfred Wilson =

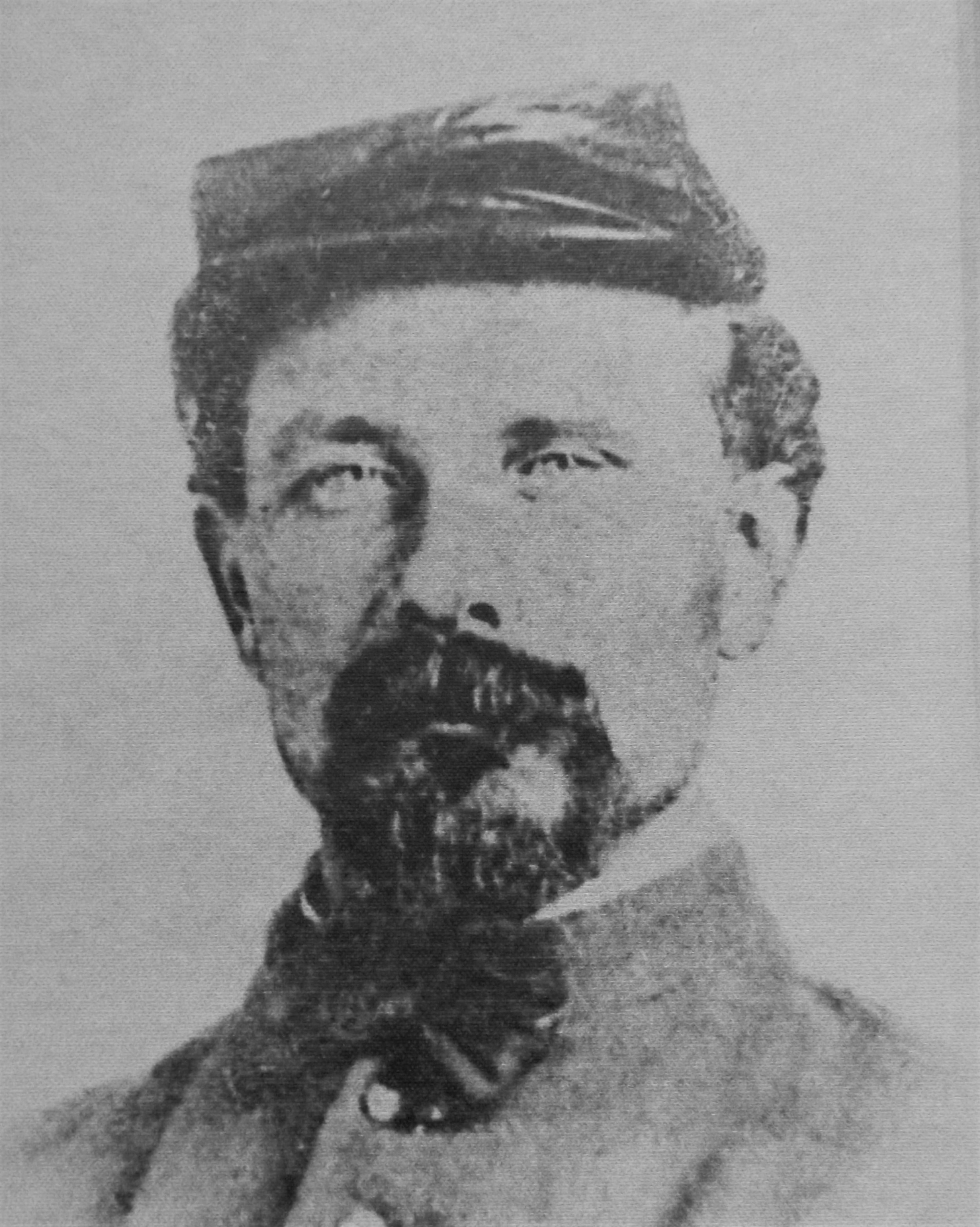
John Alfred Wilson

John Alfred Wilson (July 25, 1833 – March 28, 1904) was a member of the Andrew's Raid and one of the first recipients of the Medal of Honor.

== Biography ==
Wilson was born in Columbus, Ohio, on July 25, 1833. He served in the 21st Ohio Infantry as a private. He participated in the Great Locomotive Chase in April 1862. Following the war he wrote a book entitled "Adventures of Alf Wilson – A Thrilling Episode of the Dark Days of the Rebellion". He died on March 28, 1904, and is buried in Union Hill Cemetery, Bowling Green, Ohio.

== Career ==
For extraordinary heroism in April 1862, in action during the Andrew's Raid in Georgia. Private Wilson was one of the 19 of 22 men (including two civilians) who, by direction of General Mitchell (or Buell), penetrated nearly 200 miles (320 km) south into enemy territory and captured a railroad train at Big Shanty, Georgia, and attempted to destroy the bridges and track between Chattanooga and Atlanta.
