= Scary, West Virginia =

Scary
- Unincorporated community
- Location within the state of West Virginia Scary (the United States)
- Coordinates: 38°26′5″N 81°51′11″W
- Country: United States
- State: West Virginia
- County: Putnam
- Time zone: UTC-5 (Eastern (EST))
  - Summer (DST): UTC-4 (EDT)
- GNIS feature ID: 1555581

Scary is an unincorporated community in Putnam County, West Virginia, United States.

== History ==
During the Civil War, the area that would become Scary, West Virginia was the site of the first Confederate victory in Kanawha Valley on July 17, 1861. This is commemorated by two distinct plaques, very near to each other, in the town today.

A post office was established as Scary in 1886, and remained in operation until it was discontinued in 1931.

== Geography ==
Scary sits at 670 feet (200 m) above sea level. The community is located at the mouth of Scary Creek on the Kanawha River along U.S. Route 35.
