= William James Knight =

Soldier of 21st Ohio Volunteer Infantry

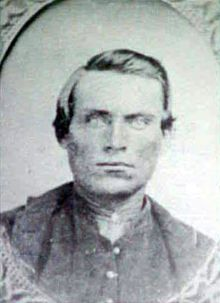
William Knight

William James Knight (1837–1916) was an American soldier, participant in Andrews' Raid and Medal of Honor recipient.

== Biography ==
Knight was born on January 24, 1837, in Apple Creek, Ohio. He trained as an engineer. He enlisted as a private in Company E of the 21st Ohio Volunteer Infantry on August 29, 1861. He was one of 22 soldiers who volunteered for Andrews' Raid in April 1862. He escaped from the Confederates following his capture. He was awarded the Medal of Honor in September, 1863. He lived in Williams County for the remainder of his life. He died on September 26, 1916, and is now buried in Oakwood Cemetery, Stryker, Ohio. He is the only person from Williams County to receive a Medal of Honor.

== Medal of Honor Citation ==
For extraordinary heroism on April, 1862, in action during the Andrew's Raid in Georgia. Private Knight was one of the 19 of 22 men (including two civilians) who, by direction of General Mitchell (or Buell), penetrated nearly 200 miles south into enemy territory and captured a railroad train at Big Shanty, Georgia, in an attempt to destroy the bridges and track between Chattanooga and Atlanta.
