= James J. Andrews =

American Union Army espionage agent during the American Civil War

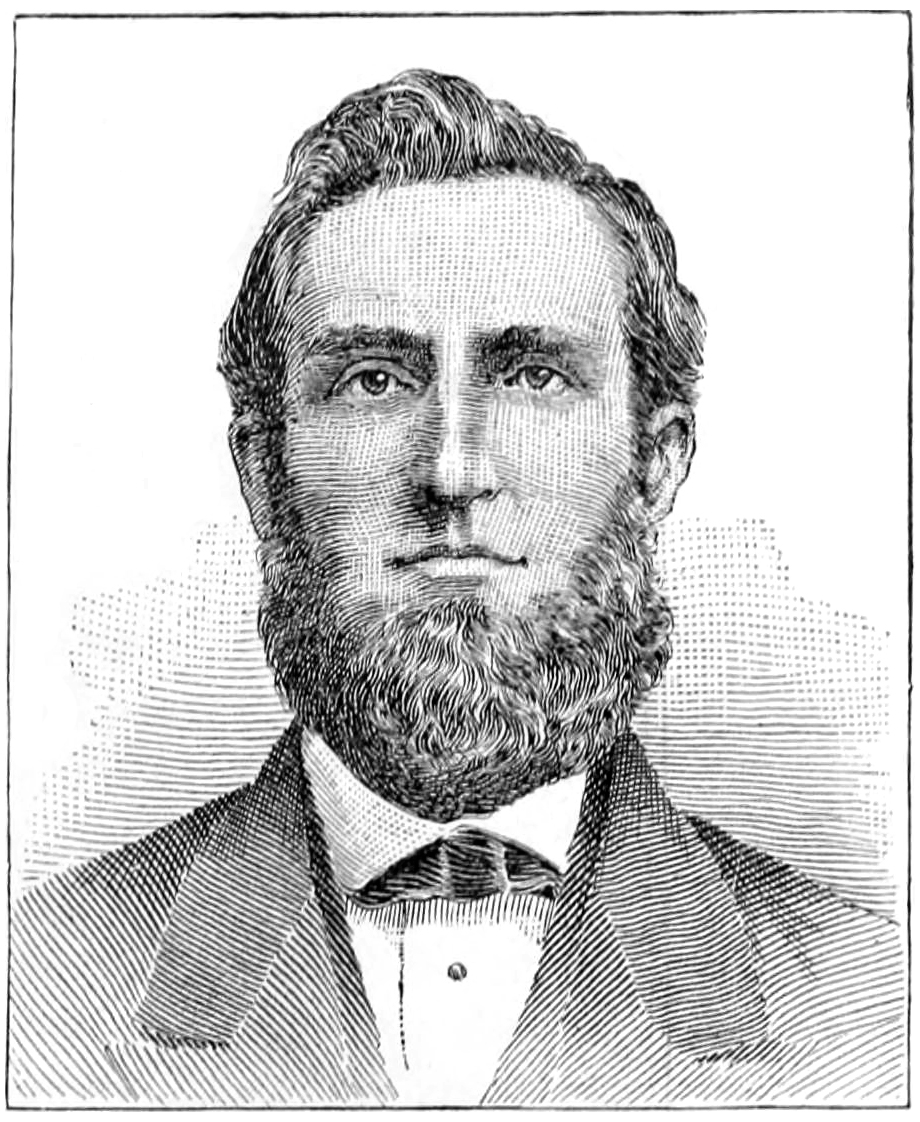
- Engraving of Andrews from 1887
- Born: c. 1829; Holiday's Cove, Virginia, US (now Weirton, West Virginia)
- Died: June 7, 1862 (aged 32–33) Atlanta, Georgia, US
- Buried: Chattanooga National Cemetery
- Allegiance: United States
- Branch: Union Army
- Rank: Civilian
- Conflicts: American Civil War: Great Locomotive Chase

James J. Andrews (c. 1829 – June 7, 1862) was a Kentucky civilian who worked for the Union Army during the early years of the American Civil War. He led a daring raid behind enemy lines on the Western and Atlantic Railroad, known as the Great Locomotive Chase. Andrews and seven fellow raiders were caught at the end of the chase and executed by the Confederates on the charge of spying.

== Biography ==
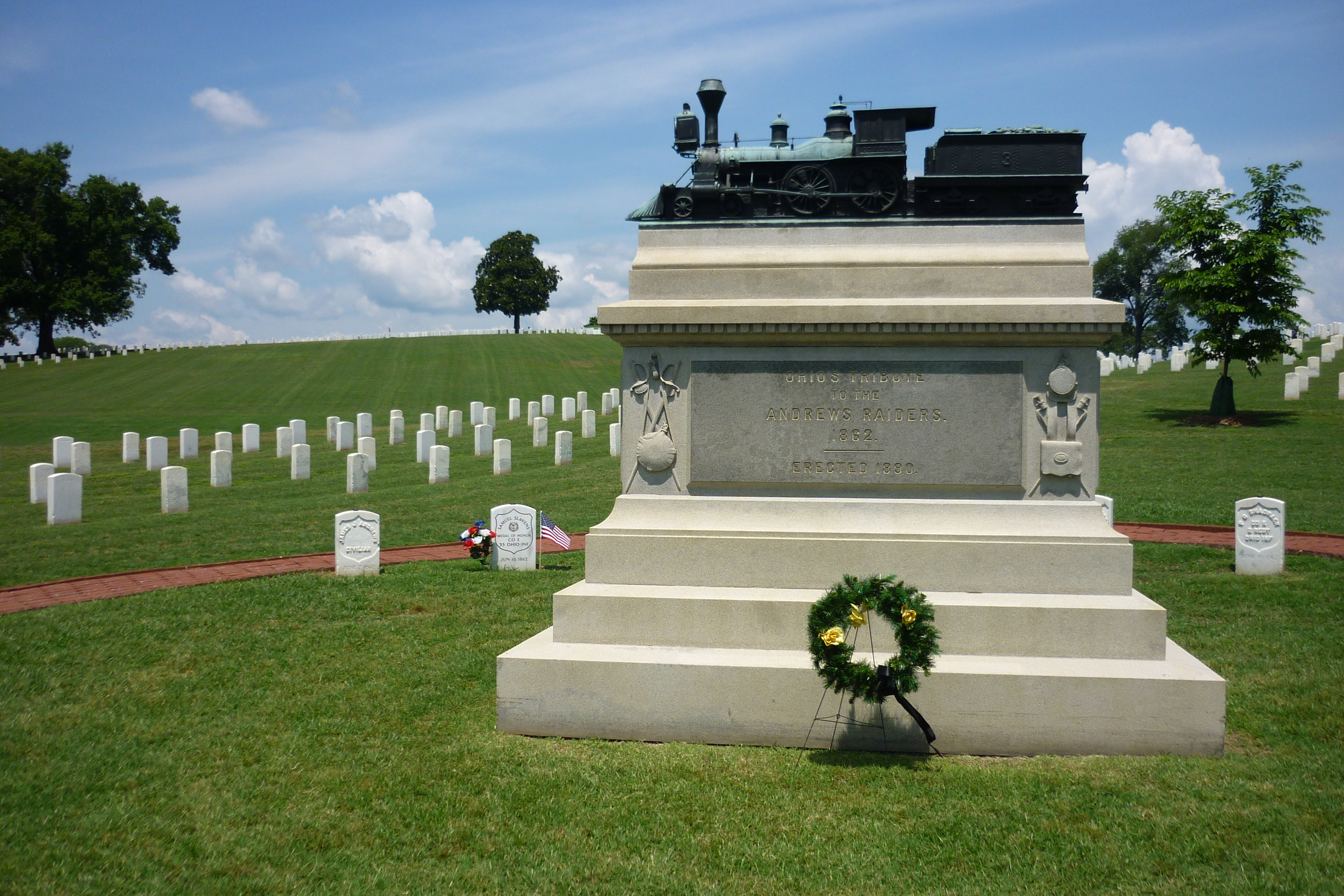
Grave of James J. Andrews and Ohio's monument to the Andrews Raiders at Chattanooga National Cemetery

Andrews was born in Holiday's Cove, Virginia (now Weirton, West Virginia). He moved to Kentucky, where he found employment as a house painter and singing coach. During the Civil War, he was engaged in buying contraband merchandise (including quinine) and smuggling it between the military lines. While serving as a secret agent and scout in Nashville, Tennessee, for Major General Don Carlos Buell in the spring of 1862, he devised a plan to take eight men to steal a train in Atlanta, Georgia, and drive it north. They would disrupt Confederate communications in western Tennessee and burn the long railroad bridge over the Tennessee River at Bridgeport. The mission failed when the required engineer failed to show up at the designated meeting place.

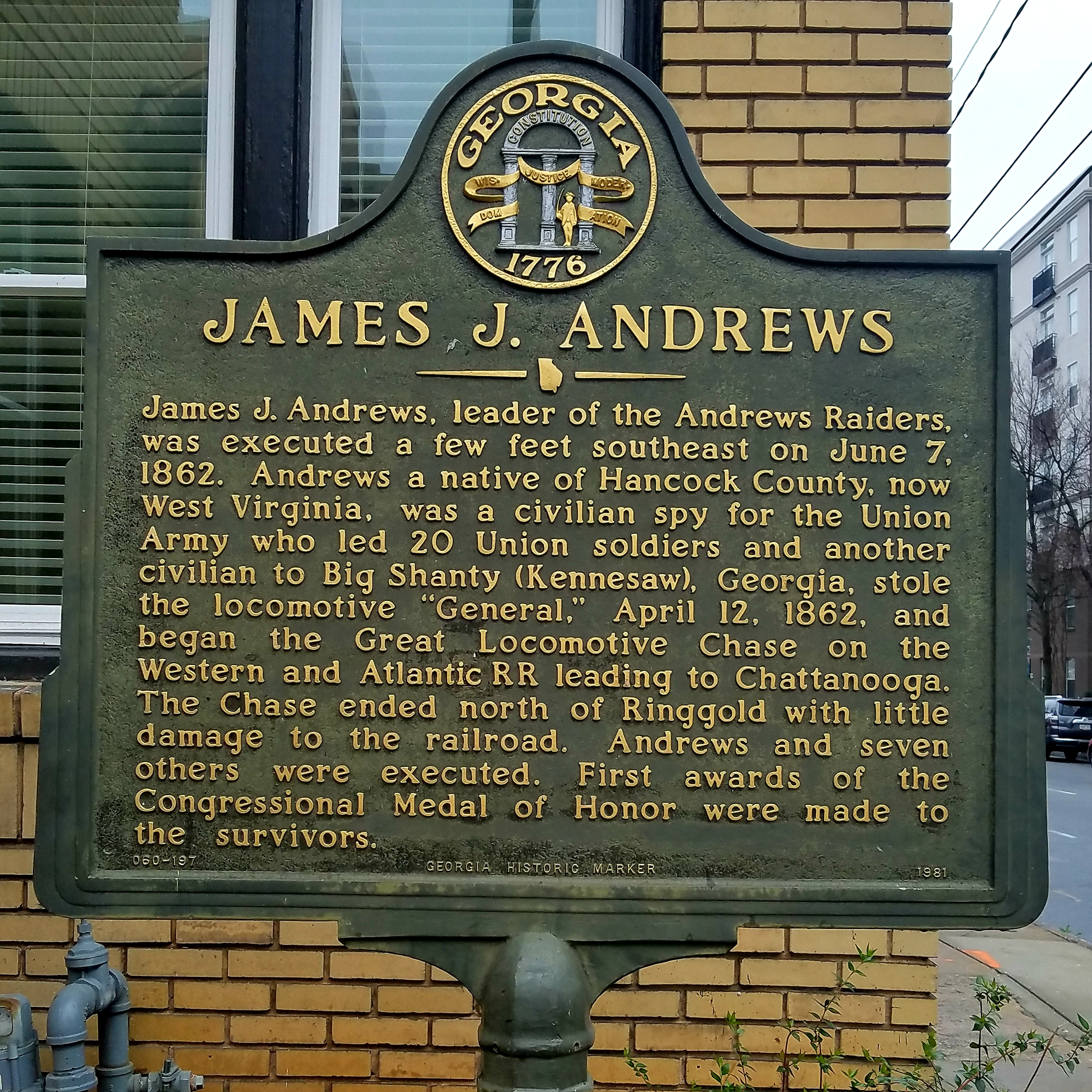
Georgia Historical Marker for Andrews in Atlanta, Georgia

In April, Andrews proposed a new scheme to Major General Ormsby M. Mitchel to seize a locomotive in northern Georgia and drive it to Chattanooga, Tennessee, where he would rendezvous with Mitchel's attacking Union Army. On April 12, 1862, Andrews, another civilian, William "Bill" Campbell, and 22 volunteers from three Ohio infantry regiments garbed in civilian clothes, stole a locomotive known as The General at Big Shanty, near Kennesaw, Georgia. They headed north, destroying tracks and telegraph wires along the way in an effort to discourage pursuers and render the railroad useless for supplying the Confederate troops in Tennessee. William Allen Fuller, the conductor of the stolen train, pursued the train hijackers on foot, by handcar, and in a variety of other locomotives, most notably the "Texas", in which he gave chase for 51 miles (82 km) in reverse. After an 87 miles (140 km) chase, the General lost power just north of Ringgold, Georgia, and Andrews and his raiders scattered. He was captured soon afterwards and identified as the leader.

He was court-martialed in Chattanooga and sentenced to hang in one week as a spy. Andrews escaped from Swims Jail on June 1, but was quickly recaptured the next day. On June 7, he was taken to Atlanta ahead of the advancing Union army by train over the same tracks that he had used during the raid. Andrews was ineptly hanged at about 5:00 that afternoon (the scaffold was so low that his feet touched the ground and he most likely died of strangulation as opposed to the internal decapitation that causes death in a proper hanging), near the present day intersection of 3rd and Juniper Streets, NE. Andrews' body was temporarily buried at the site of execution. His remains were removed to the Chattanooga National Cemetery on October 16, 1887, and a gravestone and monument to the raid was erected near the Ohio Memorial (Section H, Grave No. 12,982).

== Legacy ==
He was engaged to Elizabeth Layton of Flemingsburg, Kentucky at the time of his execution. After learning of her fiancé's death, Layton became distraught and apparently never recovered and died two years later, her family believed of a "broken heart".

The first recipients of the Medal of Honor were made to military survivors of the raid. As a civilian, Andrews was ineligible for the Medal of Honor that was presented to most of the raiders.

Walt Disney made a movie of Andrews' exploits in 1956 called The Great Locomotive Chase starring Fess Parker as Andrews. Buster Keaton's 1927 feature-length comedy masterpiece The General was also loosely based on the incident.

== See also ==
- List of Andrews Raiders
