= Great Locomotive Chase =

1862 raid during the American Civil War

- Part of the Western Theater of the American Civil War
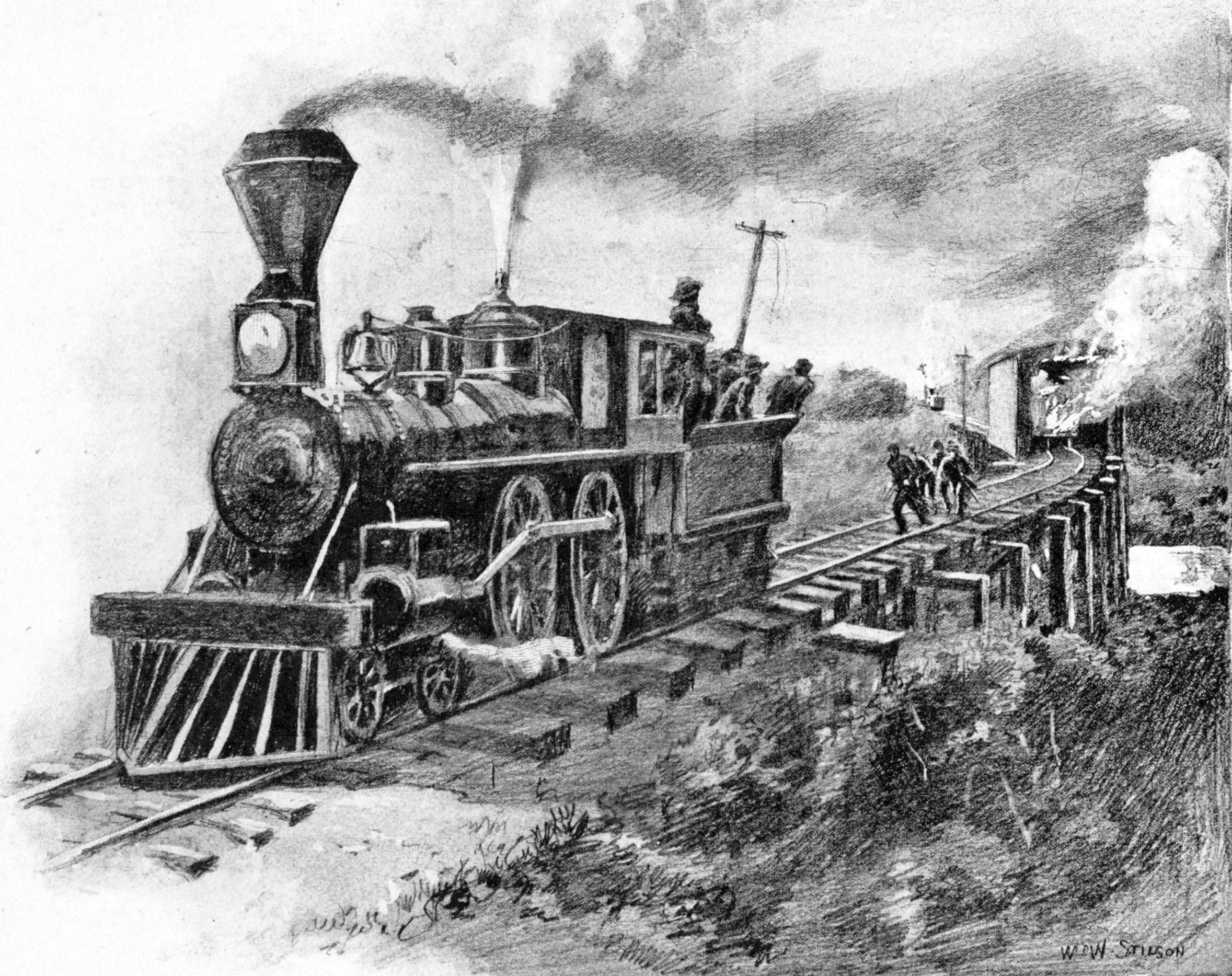
- The Andrews Raiders set a boxcar on fire to try to ignite a covered railway bridge and thwart Confederate pursuit.
Date	April 12, 1862
Location	Western and Atlantic Railroad, Georgia 34°1′24″N 84°36′55″W
Result	Confederate victory, The General recaptured

Belligerents
United States (Union raiders)	Confederate States (Western and Atlantic Railroad)

Commanders and leaders
James J. Andrews (POW)	William Fuller; Danville Leadbetter

Units involved
2nd, 21st, and 33rd Ohio Volunteer Infantry Regiment: The General	Western and Atlantic Railroad: The Texas; The Yonah

Strength
24	3 (At start)

Casualties and losses
23 (POW) (8 executed later)	None
- Adairsville, Georgia

The Great Locomotive Chase (a portion of the Andrews' Raid or the Mitchel Raid) was a military raid that occurred April 12, 1862, in northern Georgia during the American Civil War. Volunteers from the Union Army, led by civilian scout James J. Andrews, commandeered a steam locomotive, The General, and took it northward toward Chattanooga, Tennessee, doing as much damage as possible to the vital Western and Atlantic Railroad (W&A) line from Atlanta to Chattanooga as they went. They were pursued by Confederate forces at first on foot, and later on a succession of locomotives, including The Texas, for 87 miles (140 km).

Because the Union men had cut the telegraph wires, the Confederates could not send warnings ahead to forces along the railway. Confederates eventually captured the raiders and quickly executed some as spies, including Andrews; some others were able to flee. The surviving raiders were the first to be awarded the newly created Medal of Honor by the U.S. Congress for their actions. As a civilian, Andrews was not eligible.

== Military background ==
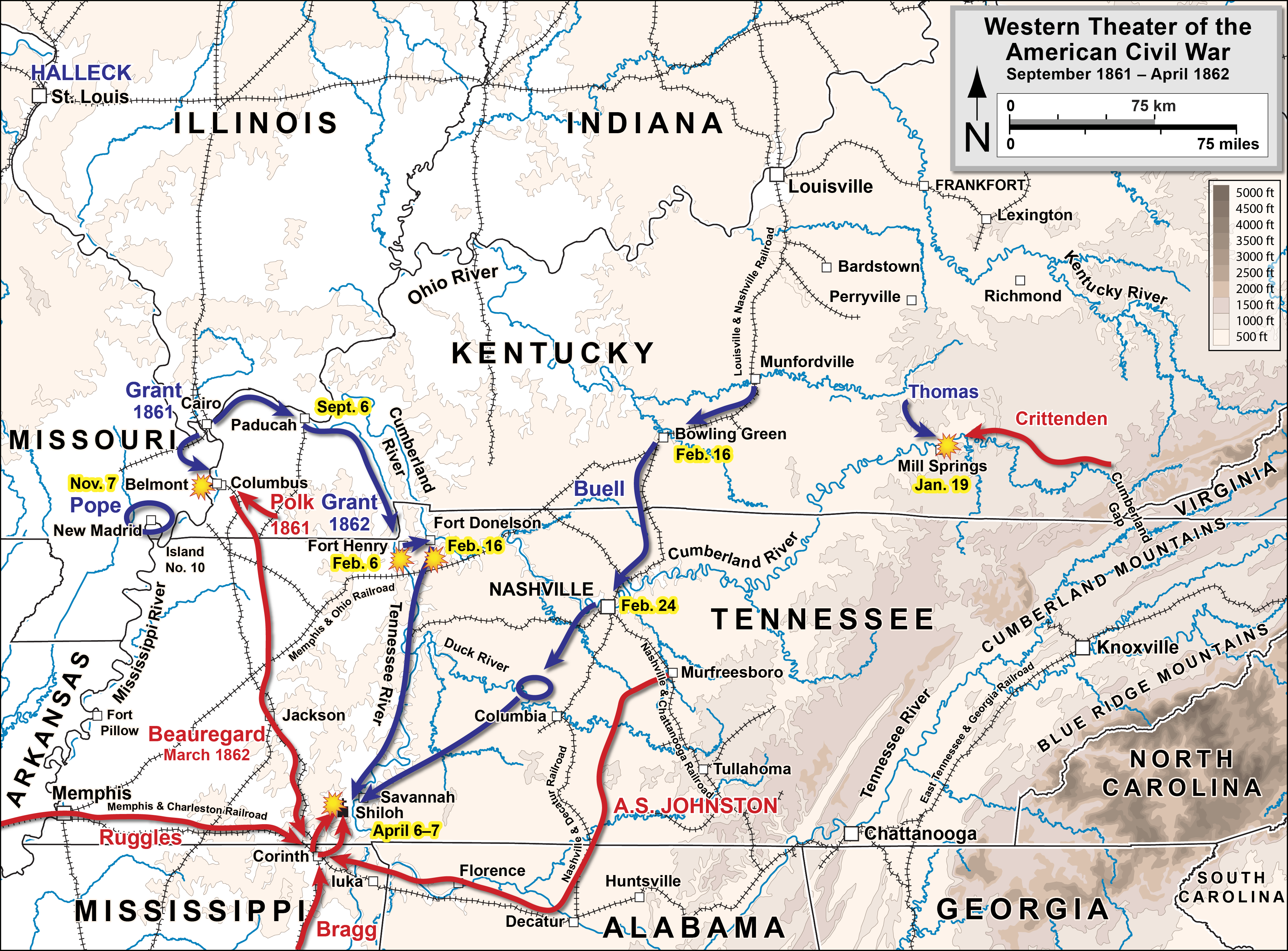
The strategic situation in March and April 1862.

After the Union capture of Fort Henry and Fort Donelson in February, Confederate General Albert Sidney Johnston withdrew his forces from central Tennessee to reorganize. As part of this withdrawal, Johnston evacuated Nashville on February 23, surrendering this important industrial center to Union Brig. Gen. Don Carlos Buell's Department of the Ohio army and making it the first Confederate state capital to fall to the Union. After taking Nashville, Buell showed little inclination for further offensive operations, especially towards the pro-Union region of East Tennessee. On March 11, Buell's army was merged into the new Department of the Mississippi under General Henry Halleck. In late March, Halleck ordered Buell southwest to reinforce Ulysses S. Grant's army near Pittsburg Landing on the Tennessee River. Buell departed, leaving a 7,000-man garrison in Nashville along with Maj. Gen. Ormsby Mitchel's 10,000-man 3rd Division. Mitchel had earlier assisted in the capture of Nashville and accepted the surrender of the city. With the withdrawal of both Confederate and Union forces towards western Tennessee, central Tennessee became an economy-of-force operation. Facing minimal Confederate resistance, Mitchel moved his division southeast out of Nashville on March 18 towards Murfreesboro, arriving on March 20.

== The first raid: March ==
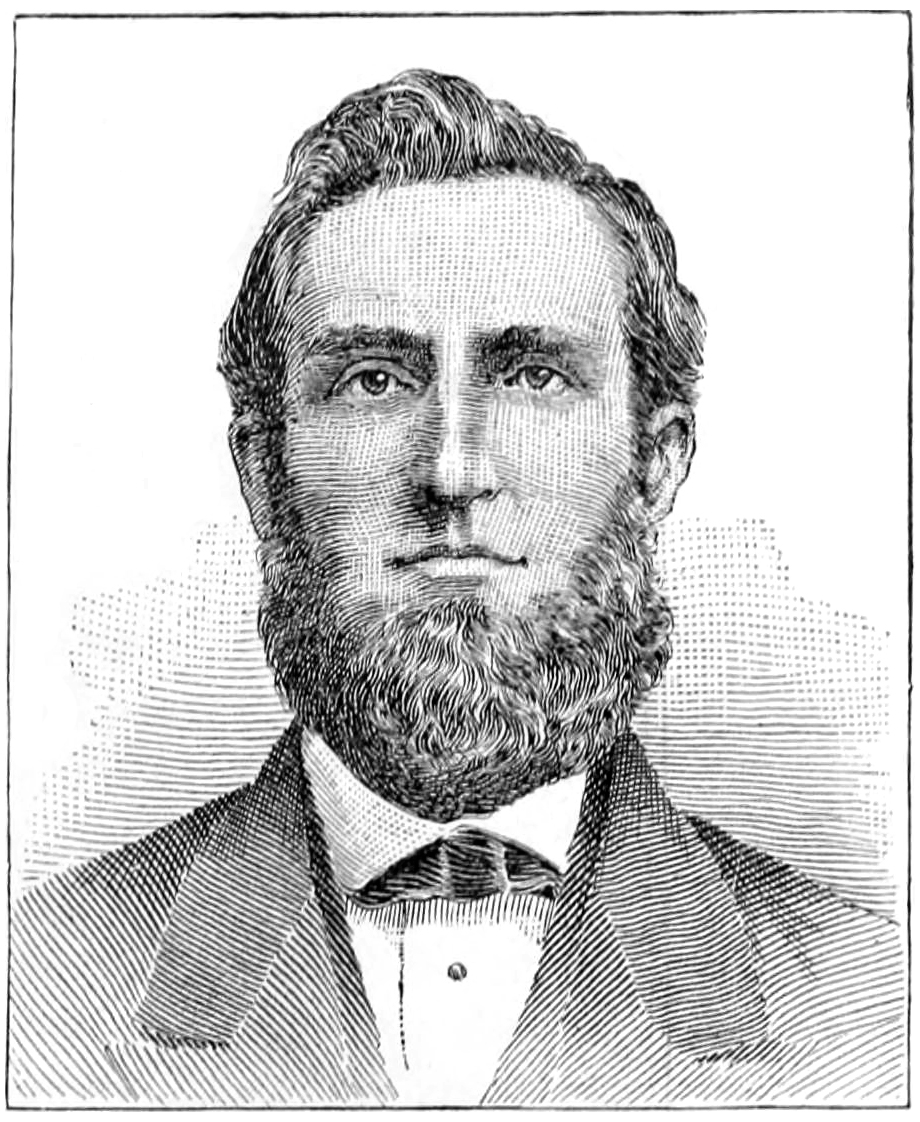
James J. Andrews

James J. Andrews was a Kentucky-born civilian serving in Tennessee in the spring of 1862 as a spy and scout for Major General Don Carlos Buell. Sometime before Buell departed Nashville in late March, Andrews presented him with a plan to take eight men to steal a train in Georgia, and drive it north. Buell would later confirm in August 1863 that he authorized this expedition. According to Andrews, a train engineer in Atlanta was willing to defect to the Union with his train, if Andrews could supply a volunteer train crew to assist running the train, tearing up track, and burning bridges. The main target was the railway bridge at Bridgeport, Alabama, although future Andrews Raider William Pittenger believed Andrews also intended to target several other bridges in Georgia and Tennessee. The volunteers for this first raid all came from General Mitchel's division, which was encamped at Murfreesboro, Tennessee. Moving south forty miles on foot to the Confederate railhead at Tullahoma, the raiders were then able to travel by train to Marietta, Georgia. There, Andrews discovered the engineer had been pressed into service elsewhere. Andrews asked if any of the raiders knew how to operate a locomotive; when none did, he called the raid off. Two raiders were also confronted by Confederate soldiers while trying to cut the telegraph lines, but pretended to be overworked wiremen. The raiders then returned north to Union lines, arriving about a week after they had departed. Andrews spent several additional days conducting reconnaissance on the Western and Atlantic Railroad before also departing back north to federal lines. None of the original raiders would volunteer for the second raid. One added that "he felt all the time he was in the enemy's country as though he had a rope around his neck."

== Background ==
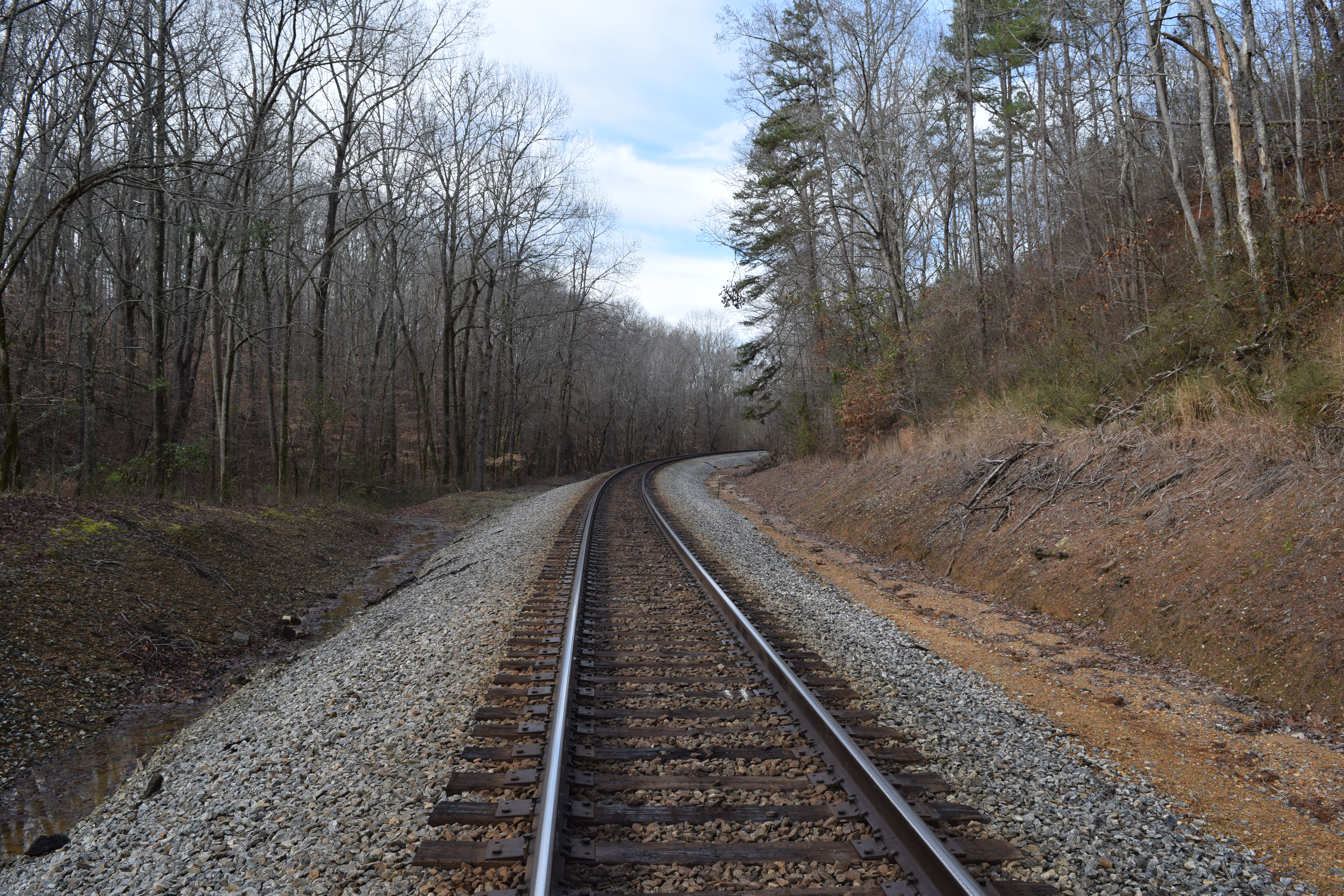
This section of the Norfolk Southern Railway was originally part of the Memphis & Charleston Railroad

Major General Ormsby M. Mitchel, commanding Federal troops in middle Tennessee, sought a way to contract or shrink the extent of the northern and western borders of the Confederacy by pushing them permanently away from and out of contact with the Ohio and Mississippi valleys. This could be done by first a southward and then an eastward penetration from the Union base at Nashville, which would seize and sever the Memphis & Charleston Railroad between Memphis and Chattanooga (at the time there were no other railway links between the Mississippi River and the east) and then capture the water and railway junction of Chattanooga, Tennessee, thereby severing the Western Confederacy's contact with both the Ohio and Mississippi river valleys.

At the time, the standard means of capturing a city was by encirclement to cut it off from supplies and reinforcements, then would follow artillery bombardment and direct assault by massed infantry. However, Chattanooga's natural water and mountain barriers to its east and south made this nearly impossible with the forces that Mitchel had available. When the Union Army threatened Chattanooga, the Confederate States Army would (from its naturally protected rear) first reinforce Chattanooga's garrison from Atlanta. When sufficient forces had been deployed to Chattanooga to stabilize the situation and hold the line, the Confederates would then launch a counterattack from Chattanooga with the advantage of a local superiority of men and materiel. It was this process that the Andrews raid sought to disrupt. If he could somehow block railroad reinforcement of the city from Atlanta to the southeast, Mitchel could take Chattanooga. The Union Army would then have rail reinforcement and supply lines to its rear, leading west to the Union-held stronghold and supply depot of Nashville, Tennessee.

== Planning ==
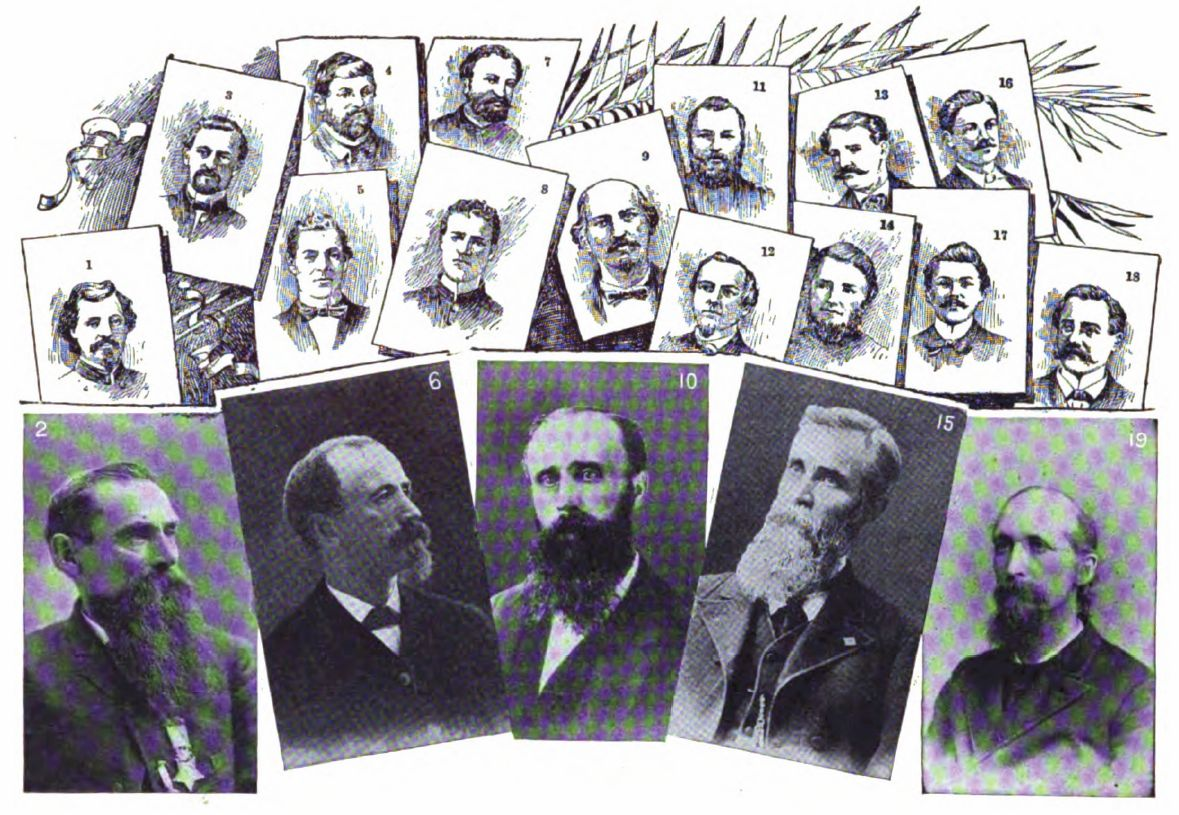
Illustration of nineteen men involved in the Great Locomotive Chase—seventeen Union soldiers and two railroad employees who chased them

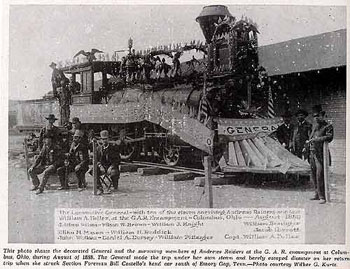
1888 reunion picture of the "Raiders" at a Grand Army of the Republic encampment at Columbus Ohio

James J. Andrews, still a civilian scout and part-time spy, proposed another daring raid to Mitchel that would destroy the Western and Atlantic Railroad as a useful reinforcement and supply link to Chattanooga from Atlanta and the rest of Georgia. He recruited the men known later as the Andrews Raiders. These were the civilian William Hunter Campbell and 22 volunteer Union soldiers from three Ohio regiments: the 2nd, 21st, and 33rd Ohio Infantry. Andrews instructed the men to arrive in Marietta, Georgia, by midnight of April 10, but heavy rain caused a one-day delay. They traveled in small parties in civilian attire to avoid arousing suspicion. All but two (Samuel Llewellyn and James Smith) reached the designated rendezvous point at the appointed time. Llewellyn and Smith joined a Confederate artillery unit, as they had been instructed to do in such circumstances. Andrews' proposal was a combined operation; General Mitchel and his forces would first move on Chattanooga; then, the Andrews' Raid would promptly destroy the rail line between Chattanooga and Atlanta. These essentially simultaneous actions would bring about the capture of Chattanooga. Andrews' Raid was intended to deprive the Confederates of the integrated use of the railways to respond to a Union advance, using their interior lines of communication.

The plan was to steal a train on its run north towards Chattanooga, stopping to damage or destroy track, bridges, telegraph wires, and track switches behind them, so as to prevent the Confederate Army from being able to move troops and supplies from Atlanta to Chattanooga. The raiders planned to cross through the Federal siege lines on the outskirts of Chattanooga and rejoin Mitchel's army.

Because railway dining cars were not yet in common use, railroad timetables included water, rest, and meal stops. They planned to steal a train just north of Atlanta at Big Shanty, Georgia (now Kennesaw). They chose Big Shanty because they thought Big Shanty did not have a telegraph office and the stop would also be used to refuel and take on water for the steep grade further north.

== The chase ==
=== Big Shanty to Kingston ===
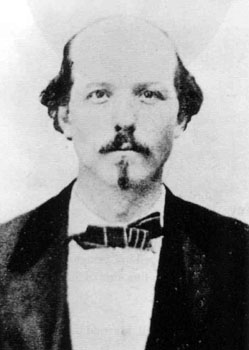
Conductor William A. Fuller

The raid began on April 12, 1862, when the regular morning passenger train from Atlanta, with the locomotive General, stopped for breakfast at the Lacy Hotel. They took the General and the train's three boxcars, which were behind the tender in front of the passenger cars. The passenger cars were left behind. Andrews had previously obtained from the work crew a crowbar for tearing up track.

The train's conductor, William Allen Fuller, and two other men, chased the stolen train, first on foot, then by a handcar belonging to a work crew shortly north of Big Shanty. Locomotives of the time normally averaged 15 miles per hour (24 km/h), with short bursts of speed of about 20 miles per hour (32 km/h). In addition, the terrain north of Atlanta is very hilly, and the ruling grades are steep. Even today, average speeds are rarely greater than 40 miles per hour (64 km/h) between Chattanooga and Atlanta. Since Andrews intended to stop periodically to perform acts of sabotage, a determined pursuer, even on foot, could conceivably have caught up with the train before it reached Chattanooga.

At Etowah, the raiders passed the older and smaller locomotive Yonah which was on a siding that led to the nearby Cooper Iron Works. Andrews considered stopping to attack and destroy that locomotive so it could not be used by pursuers, but given the size of its work party (even though unarmed) relative to the size of the raiding party, he judged that any firefight would be too long and too involved, and would alert nearby troops and civilians.

As the raiders had stolen a regularly scheduled train on a railroad with only one track, they needed to keep to that train's timetable. If they reached a siding ahead of schedule, they had to wait there until scheduled southbound trains passed them before they could continue north. Andrews claimed to the station masters he encountered that his train was a special northbound ammunition movement ordered by General Beauregard in support of his operations against the Union forces threatening Chattanooga. This story was sufficient for the isolated station masters Andrews encountered (as he had cut the telegraph wires to the south), but it had no impact upon the train dispatchers and station masters north of him, whose telegraph lines to Chattanooga were working. These dispatchers were following their orders to dispatch and control the special train movements southward at the highest priority.

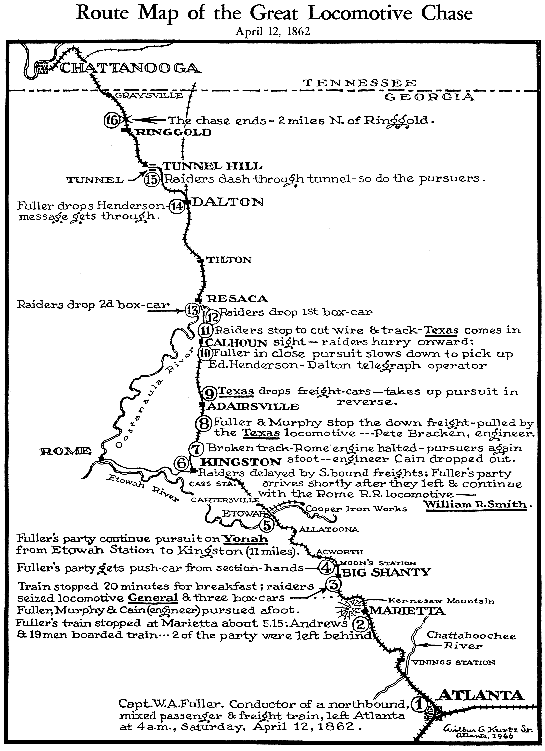
Map of the chase route, with locations of various events marked

Thus delayed at the junction town of Kingston, as the first of the southbound freight evacuation trains approached, Andrews inquired of that train's conductor why his train was carrying a red marker flag on its rear car. Andrews was told that Confederate Railway officials in Chattanooga had been notified by Confederate Army officials that Mitchel was approaching Chattanooga from Stevenson, Alabama, intending to either capture or lay siege to the city, and as a result of this warning, the Confederate Military Railways had ordered the Special Freight movements. The red train marker flag on the southbound train meant that there was at least one additional train behind the one which Andrews had just encountered, and that Andrews had no "authority for movement" until the last train of that sectional movement had passed him. The raiders being delayed at Kingston for over an hour, this gave Fuller all the time he needed to close the distance.

=== Kingston to Adairsville ===
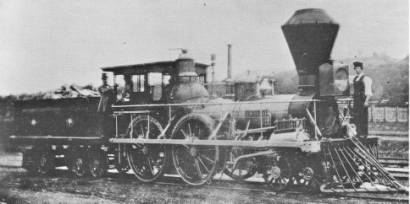
The Amenia locomotive of the New York and Harlem Railroad, built by Rogers, Ketchum & Grosvenor a year after the company built the Yonah, which is believed to have been of similar design.

The raiders finally pulled out of Kingston only moments before Fuller's arrival. They still managed north of Kingston again to cut the telegraph wire and break a rail. Meanwhile, moving north on the handcar, Fuller had spotted the locomotive Yonah at Etowah and commandeered it, chasing the raiders north all the way to Kingston. There, Fuller switched to the locomotive William R. Smith, which was on a sidetrack leading west to the town of Rome, Georgia, and continued north towards Adairsville.

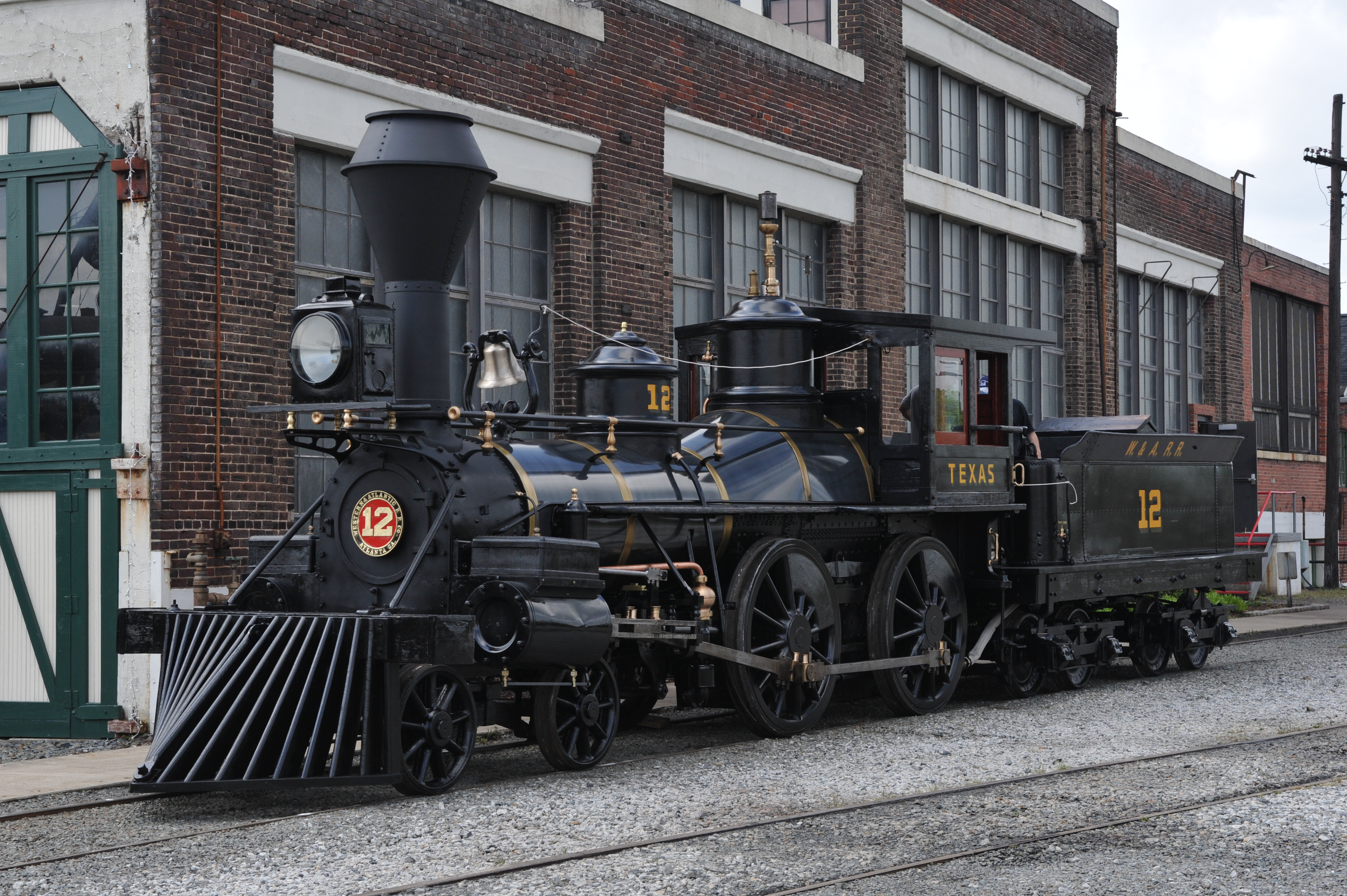
The Texas after cosmetic restoration at Spencer Shops, North Carolina Transportation Museum. The engine is now on display at the Atlanta History Center.

Two miles south of Adairsville, however, the pursuers were stopped by the broken track, forcing Fuller and his party to continue the pursuit on foot. Beyond the damaged section, he took command of the southbound locomotive Texas south of Calhoun, where Andrews had passed it, running it backwards. The Texas train crew had been bluffed by Andrews at Calhoun into taking the station siding, thereby allowing the General to continue northward along the single-track main line. Fuller, when he met the Texas, took command of her, picked up eleven Confederate troops at Calhoun, and continued his pursuit, tender-first, northward.

=== Adairsville to Ringgold ===
The raiders now never got far ahead of Fuller and never had enough time to stop and take up a rail to halt the Texas. Destroying the railway behind the hijacked train was a slow process. The raiders were too few in number and were too poorly equipped with the proper railway track tools and demolition equipment, and the rain that day made it difficult to burn the bridges. As well, railway officials in Chattanooga had sufficient time to evacuate engines and rolling stock to the south, hauling critical railroad supplies away from the Union threat, so as to prevent their either being captured by General Mitchel or trapped uselessly inside Chattanooga during a Union siege of the city.

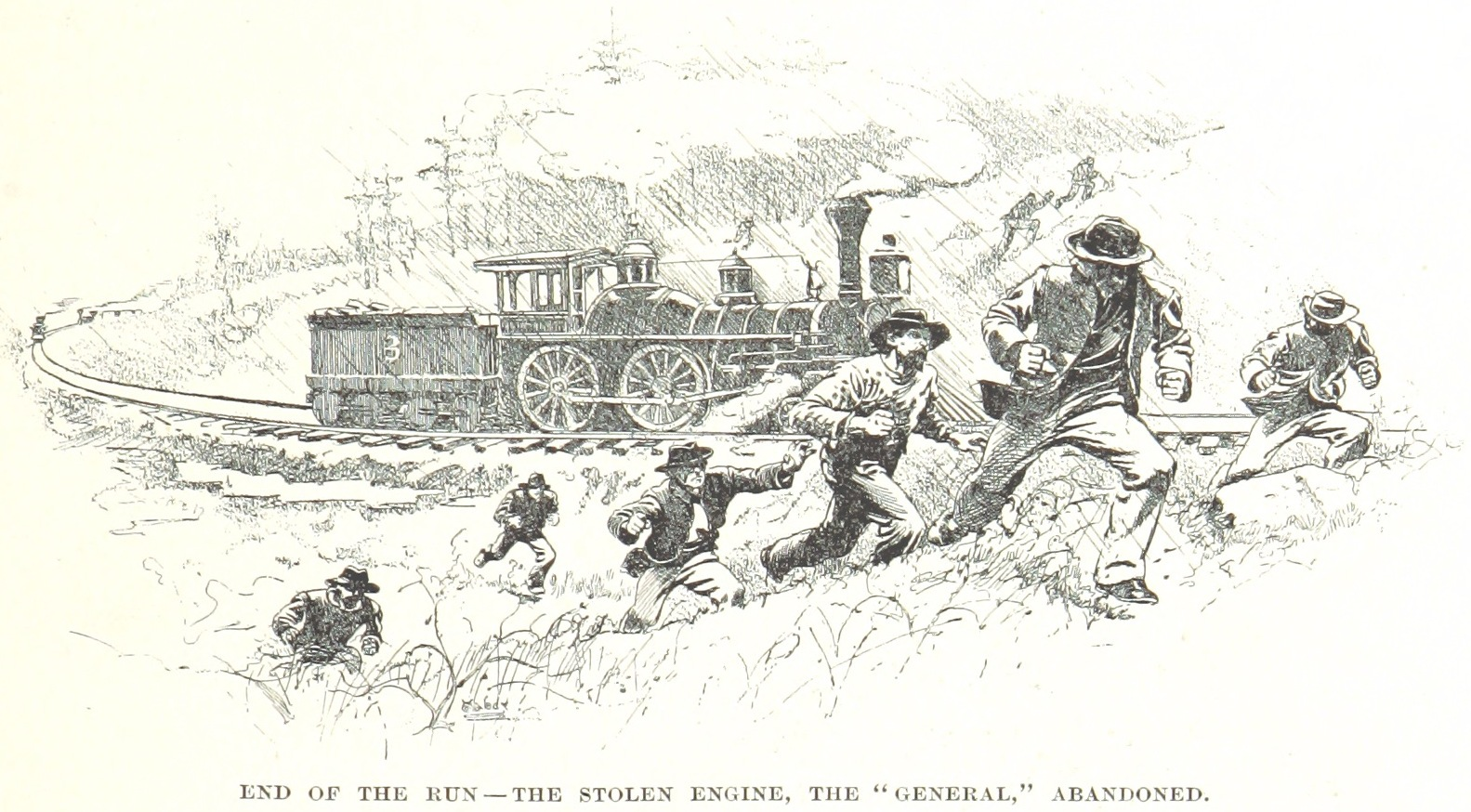
Andrews's men abandon the General

With the Texas still chasing the General tender-first, the two trains steamed through Dalton and Tunnel Hill. The raiders continued to sever the telegraph wires, but they were unable to burn bridges or damage Tunnel Hill. The wood they had hoped to burn was soaked by rain. Just before the raiders cut the telegraph wire north of Dalton, Fuller managed to send off a message from there alerting the authorities in Chattanooga of the approaching stolen engine.

Finally, at milepost 116.3, north of Ringgold, Georgia, just 18 miles from Chattanooga, with the locomotive out of fuel, Andrews's men abandoned the General and scattered. Andrews and all of his men were caught within two weeks, including the two who had missed the hijacking. Mitchel's attack on Chattanooga ultimately failed.

== Aftermath ==
=== Trials and executions ===
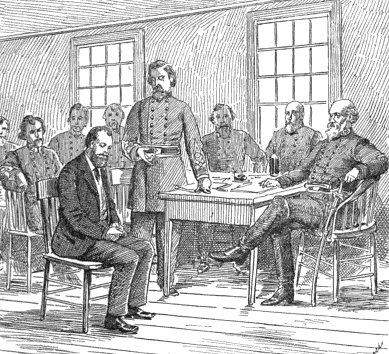
Depiction of the court-martial of one of the raiders in Knoxville

Confederate forces charged all the raiders with "acts of unlawful belligerency"; the civilians were charged as unlawful combatants and spies. All the prisoners were tried in military courts, or courts-martial. Tried in Chattanooga, Andrews was found guilty. He was executed by hanging on June 7 in Atlanta. On June 18, seven others who had been transported to Knoxville and convicted as spies were returned to Atlanta and also hanged; their bodies were buried unceremoniously in an unmarked grave. They were later reburied in Chattanooga National Cemetery.

=== Escape and exchange ===
Writing about the exploit, Corporal William Pittenger said that the remaining raiders worried about also being executed. They attempted to escape and eight succeeded. Traveling for hundreds of miles in pairs, the eight made it back safely to Union lines, including two who were aided by slaves and Union sympathizers and two who floated down the Chattahoochee River until they were rescued by the Union blockade vessel USS Somerset in the Gulf of Mexico. The remaining six were held as prisoners of war and exchanged for Confederate prisoners on March 17, 1863.

== Medal of Honor ==
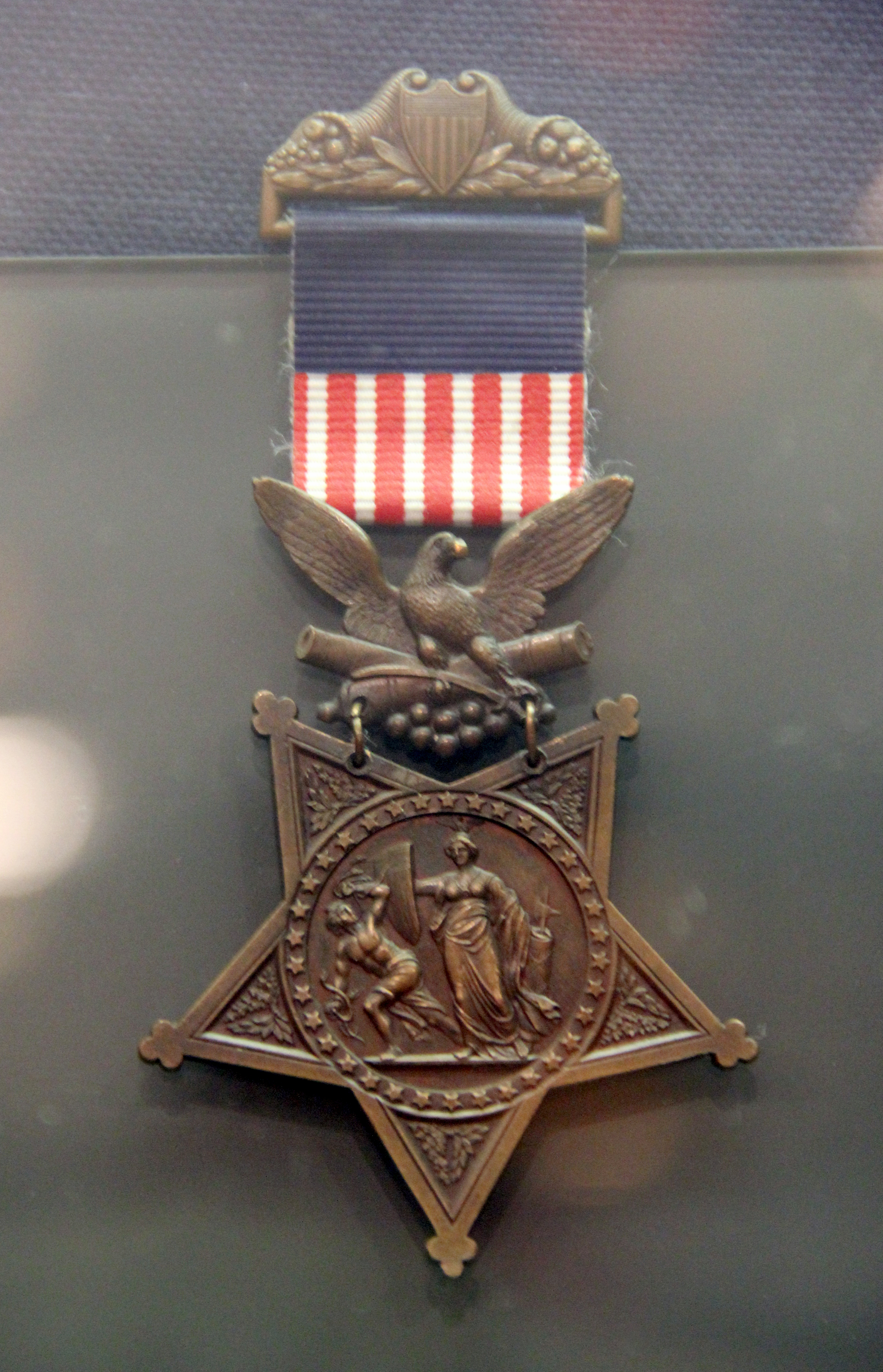
Medal of Honor awarded posthumously in 1866 to raider John Morehead Scott.

On March 20, the recently released raiders arrived in Washington DC, and the following day Pittenger wrote a letter to Secretary of War Edwin M. Stanton detailing their mission to Georgia. On March 24, they were interviewed by Judge Advocate General Joseph Holt, who was able to corroborate details of their mission with testimony from the raiders who had escaped in 1862. On March 25, they were invited to Stanton's office at the Department of War. After a brief conversation, Stanton announced that the raiders would receive the newly approved Medal of Honor. Private Jacob Parrott, who had been physically abused as a prisoner, was awarded the first. The others were Sergeant Elihu H. Mason, Corporals William Pittenger and William H. H. Reddick, and Privates William Bensinger, and Robert Buffum. Stanton also offered them all commissions as First Lieutenant. After the ceremony the six raiders were taken to the White House to meet President Abraham Lincoln, which became a tradition for all Medal of Honor recipients. Later, all but three of the other soldiers who had participated in the raid also received the Medal of Honor, with posthumous awards to families for those who had been executed. As civilians, Andrews and Campbell were not eligible. In 2008, the House of Representatives passed a bill which would retroactively award the Medal of Honor to two of the three remaining raiders, Charles Perry Shadrack and George Davenport Wilson. On July 3, 2024, President Joe Biden posthumously presented the medal to descendants of both Shadrack and Wilson. All the Medals of Honor presented to the Andrews Raiders used identical text.

Citation:

One of the 19 of 22 men (including 2 civilians) who, by direction of Gen. Mitchell (or Buell) penetrated nearly 200 miles south into enemy territory and captured a railroad train at Big Shanty, Ga., in an attempt to destroy the bridges and tracks between Chattanooga and Atlanta.

== Legacy ==
Both The General and The Texas survived the war and have been preserved in museums. The General is located at the Southern Museum of Civil War and Locomotive History, in Kennesaw, Georgia, close to where the chase began. The Texas is at the Atlanta History Center.

The first account of the chase was published a year after the event in 1863 by William Pittenger, one of the Andrews Raiders, under the title of Daring and Suffering. It would be republished in 1881 as Capturing a Locomotive and 1889 as The Great Locomotive Chase. The book was a major success and was widely praised. Two decades later, one newspaper would claim it "was in half the old soldier households in the country."

Buster Keaton's silent film comedy The General is loosely based on Pittenger's memoirs.

In 1956, Walt Disney Productions released the dramatic film The Great Locomotive Chase, also based on Pittenger's memoirs, starring Fess Parker as Andrews and Jeffrey Hunter as Fuller and filmed on the Tallulah Falls Railway in North Carolina. Walt Disney, who personally supervised parts of the production, also rented the 4-4-0 locomotives William Mason to play The General, the Inyo to play The Texas, and Lafayette to play The Yonah. The same year, Dell Publishing published a paperback original movie tie-in, The Great Locomotive Chase by MacLennan Roberts, "Based on the Walt Disney Production and on authentic Civil War documents", according to the cover blurb.

Since at least 1979, the city of Adairsville has held The Great Locomotive Chase Festival, a three-day festival in October which commemorates the event.

In 2000, composer Robert W. Smith wrote a concert piece named for and inspired by the incident.

In 2019, the raid was featured on Comedy Central show Drunk History in the episode "Behind Enemy Lines", narrated by Jon Gabrus, with John Francis Daley portraying Andrews and Martin Starr as Fuller.

== Monument and markers ==
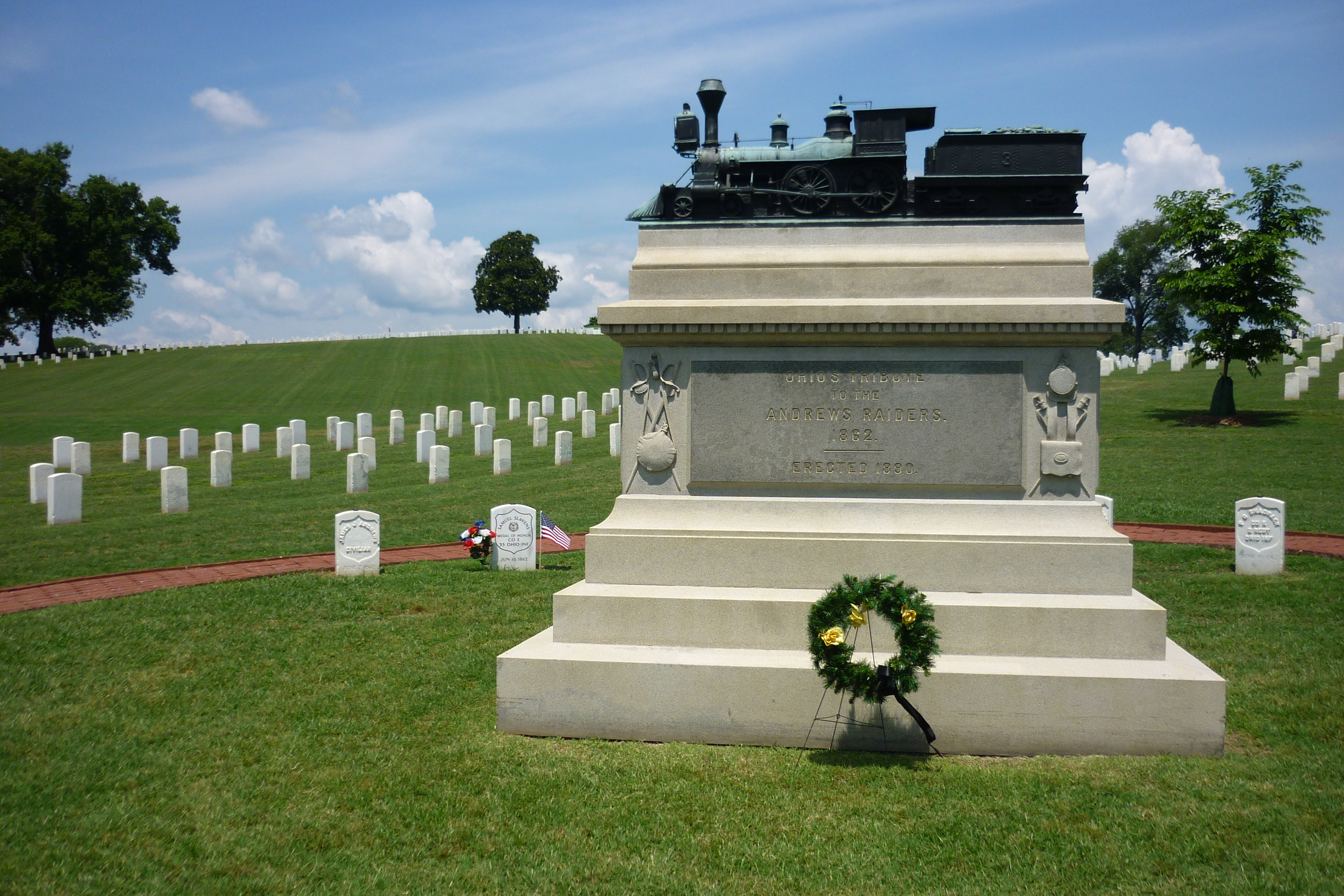
Andrews Raiders monument at Chattanooga National Cemetery in 2015

The Ohio monument dedicated to the Andrews Raiders is located at the Chattanooga National Cemetery. There is a scale model of the General on top of the monument, and a brief history of the Great Locomotive Chase. The General is now in the Southern Museum of Civil War and Locomotive History, Kennesaw, Georgia, while the Texas is on display at the Atlanta History Center.

One marker indicates where the chase began, near the Big Shanty Museum (now known as Southern Museum of Civil War and Locomotive History) in Kennesaw, while another shows where the chase ended at Milepost 116.3, north of Ringgold – not far from the recently restored depot at Milepost 114.5.

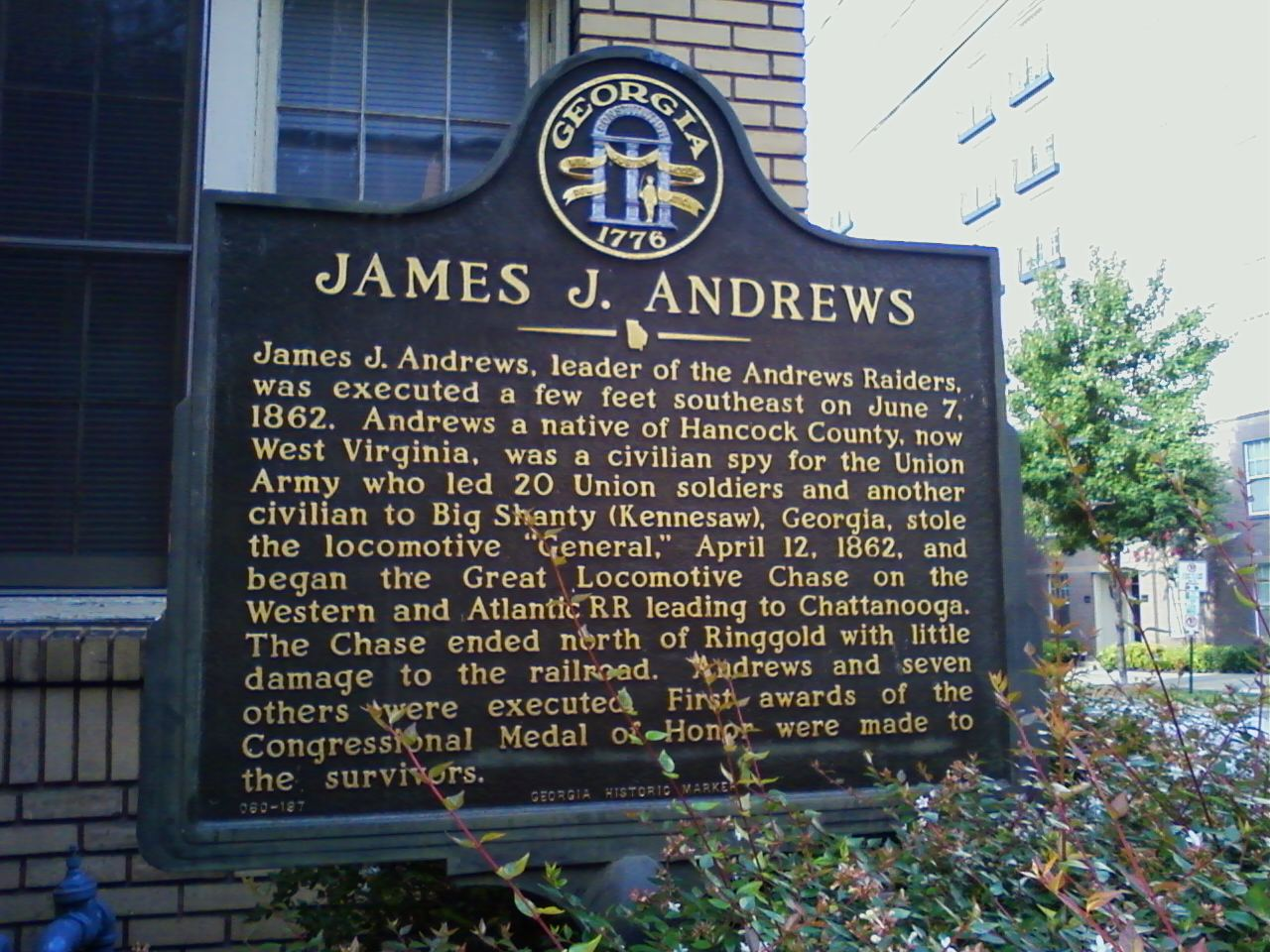
Historical marker at the site in downtown Atlanta where Andrews was executed

Historic sites along the 1862 chase route include the following:

- marker near Big Shanty Museum
- Big Shanty Village Historic District
- Camp McDonald
- Acworth Downtown Historic District
- Tarleton Moore House
- Grand Theater (Cartersville, Georgia)
- Old Bartow County Courthouse, now the Bartow History Museum, built so close to the railroad that court was interrupted when any train passed, not built until 1869
- Adairsville Historic District
- the Calhoun Depot, built in 1852–53, at Calhoun, 10 miles north of Adairsville.
- Calhoun Downtown Historic District
- William Taylor House (Resaca, Georgia), associated with northern Georgia soldiers who fought for the Union in the Civil War, though house not built until 1913
- Masonic Lodge No. 238, not built until 1915
- Dalton Commercial Historic District
- Western and Atlantic Depot, Dalton, Georgia
- Crown Mill Historic District
- Western and Atlantic Railroad Tunnel at Tunnel Hill
- Ringgold Gap Battlefield, gap between White Oak Mountain and Taylor Ridge through which railway runs, site of November 1863 battle protecting Confederate retreat after Battle of Missionary Ridge at Chattanooga
- Ringgold Depot
- Ringgold Commercial Historic District
- marker at milepost 116.3

Kennesaw House, 21 Depot St. (c. 1845), a hotel on the L&N railway in Marietta, Georgia, is a contributing building in the Northwest Marietta Historic District. In 1862 this was the Fletcher House hotel where the Andrews Raiders stayed the night before commandeering The General.

There is a historical marker in downtown Atlanta, at the corner of 3rd and Juniper streets, at the site where Andrews was hanged.

== See also ==
- East Tennessee bridge burnings
- Henry P. Haney
- List of Andrews Raiders
- Samuel P. Carter

== Notes ==
=== Bibliography ===
- Bonds, Russell S. (2006). Stealing the General: The Great Locomotive Chase and the First Medal of Honor. Westholme Publishing. ISBN 1-59416-033-3.
- Esposito, Vincent J. (1959). West Point Atlas of American Wars. Vol. 1: 1689–1900 (1st ed.). New York: Frederick A. Praeger Publishers. OCLC 5890637.
- Gott, Kendall D (2003). Where the South Lost the War: An Analysis of the Fort Henry – Fort Donelson Campaign, February 1862. Mechanicsburg, PA: Stackpole Books. ISBN 0-8117-0049-6.
- Gross, Parlee C. (1963). The Case of Private Smith and the Remaining Mysteries of the Andrews Raid. General Publishing Company.
- Nevin, David (1983). The Road to Shiloh: Early Battles in the West. Alexandria, VA: Time-Life Books. ISBN 0-8094-4716-9.
- O'Neill, Charles (1959). Wild Train: The Story of the Andrews Raiders. New York: Random House.
- Pittenger, William (1885). The great locomotive chase; a history of the Andrews railroad raid into Georgia in 1862,. New York: J.B. Alden.
- Pittenger, William (1881). Capturing a Locomotive: A History of Secret Service in the Late War. Washington DC: The National Tribune.
- Pittenger, Lieut. William (1863). Daring and Suffering: A History of the Great Railroad Adventure. J. W. Daughaday.
- Rottman, Gordon L. (2009). The Great Locomotive Chase – The Andrews Raid 1862. Osprey Publishing. ISBN 978-1-84603-400-8. Archived from the original on 2022-09-11.
