= National Register of Historic Places listings in Catoosa County, Georgia =

This is a list of properties and districts in Catoosa County, Georgia that are listed on the National Register of Historic Places (NRHP).

This National Park Service list is complete through NPS recent listings posted March 6, 2026.

== Current listings ==
	Name on the Register	Image	Date listed	Location	City or town	Description
1	Blackford-Gray House	Blackford-Gray House	April 4, 2007 (#07000247)	319 Gray St. 34°58′38″N 85°08′34″W	Graysville	
2	Catoosa County Courthouse	Catoosa County Courthouse	September 20, 2006 (#06000844)	7694 Nashville St. 34°54′56″N 85°06′39″W	Ringgold	
3	Chickamauga and Chattanooga National Military Park	Chickamauga and Chattanooga National Military Park	October 15, 1966 (#66000274)	S of Chattanooga on U.S. 27; 34°58′09″N 85°17′07″W	Fort Oglethorpe	administered by the National Park Service
4	Fort Oglethorpe Historic District	Fort Oglethorpe Historic District	April 20, 1979 (#79000702)	U.S. 27; 34°56′46″N 85°15′46″W	Fort Oglethorpe	
5	Ringgold Commercial Historic District	Ringgold Commercial Historic District	January 30, 1992 (#91002001)	Nashville St. between Tennessee and Depot Sts. 34°54′56″N 85°06′30″W	Ringgold	
6	Ringgold Depot	Ringgold Depot	November 30, 1978 (#78000968)	U.S. 41; 34°54′55″N 85°06′28″W	Ringgold	
7	Ringgold Gap Battlefield	Ringgold Gap Battlefield	March 12, 2011 (#11000079)	White Oak Mountain, east of Ringgold and north of Interstate 75, and the northeast face of Taylor Ridge south of I-75; 34°54′36″N 85°06′10″W	Ringgold	Chickamauga-Chattanooga Civil War-Related Sites in Georgia and Tennessee MPS
8	Stone Church	Stone Church	November 29, 1979 (#79000703)	E of Ringgold off U.S. 76; 34°54′23″N 85°04′37″W	Ringgold	
9	Whitman-Anderson House	Whitman-Anderson House	October 5, 1977 (#77000412)	309 Tennessee St. 34°55′03″N 85°06′33″W	Ringgold	
