= National Register of Historic Places listings in Gordon County, Georgia =

This is a list of properties and districts in Gordon County, Georgia that are listed on the National Register of Historic Places (NRHP).

This National Park Service list is complete through NPS recent listings posted August 7, 2026.

== Current listings ==
	Name on the Register	Image	Date listed	Location	City or town	Description
1	Calhoun Depot	Calhoun Depot	August 26, 1982 (#82002422)	Between Court and Oothcalooga Sts. 34°30′07″N 84°57′11″W	Calhoun	
2	Calhoun Downtown Historic District	Calhoun Downtown Historic District	June 8, 2011 (#11000332)	Junction of Court St. and Wall St. 34°30′09″N 84°57′05″W	Calhoun	
3	Freeman-Hurt House	Freeman-Hurt House	January 1, 1976 (#76000636)	S of Oakman on U.S. 411; 34°33′06″N 84°42′17″W	Ranger	
4	New Echota	New Echota	May 13, 1970 (#70000869)	NE of Calhoun on GA 225; 34°32′21″N 84°54′12″W	Calhoun	National Historic Landmark and a Georgia state historic site
5	William Taylor House		November 27, 2002 (#02001414)	3032 Battlefield Parkway; 34°34′47″N 84°56′36″W	Resaca	No longer exists, photo of location in the article
