= Wilson W. Brown =

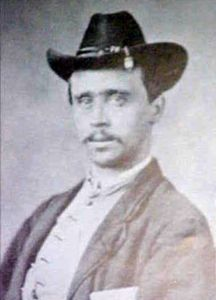
- Wilson W. Brown
- Born: December 25, 1839; Logan County, Ohio
- Died: December 25, 1916 (aged 77); Toledo, Ohio
- Military career
- Allegiance: United States; Union
- Branch: United States Army; Union Army
- Service years: September 19, 1861 – May 15, 1864
- Rank: Second Lieutenant
- Unit: 21st Regiment Ohio Volunteer Infantry - Company F
- Conflicts: Great Locomotive Chase, Battle of Stones River, Battle of Chickamauga
- Awards: Medal of Honor

Wilson Wright Brown (December 25, 1839 – December 25, 1916) was a soldier and recipient of the Medal of Honor for his role in the Great Locomotive Chase during the American Civil War.

== Life ==
Wilson Wright Brown was born December 25, 1839, in Logan County, Ohio, and enlisted September 6, 1861 at Findlay, Ohio in Company F, 21st Ohio Infantry, mustering into service September 19, 1861. He first saw action at Ivy Mountain, Ky., November 8–9, 1861.

Chosen by James Andrews for his abilities as a locomotive engineer, as he had been an engineer on the Mobile & Ohio Railroad before the war, he took part in the Andrews’ Raid (Great Locomotive Chase) in April 1862. The raid sought to cut off Confederate supply lines from Atlanta to Chattanooga, by going behind Confederate lines and destroying the Western & Atlantic Railroad. Captured by the Confederates, he was imprisoned in Atlanta’s old Fulton County Jail for most of 1862 before escaping with seven of his fellow raiders.

He was promoted to Sergeant, November 1, 1862. He later saw action at the Battle of Stones River, December 31, 1862 - January 3, 1863, at Dug Gap, Georgia, September 11, 1863 and was wounded at the Battle of Chickamauga. In 1863, Brown was awarded a Medal of Honor for his actions during the raid. He was discharged May 15, 1864.

He married Clarissa Lowman, July 12, 1863. In the years after the war, Wilson Brown remained friends with fellow raider Jacob Parrott. Edith Gertrude Brown, one of his eight children, subsequently married Jacob Parrott’s only son, John Marion Parrott.

Brown maintained a friendship with Captain William A. Fuller, the General’s conductor, and traveled with other raiders to Atlanta for reunions, on railroad passes issued by the Nashville, Chattanooga and St. Louis Railway, successor to the Western & Atlantic.

In the 1950s Disney Studios released the movie The Great Locomotive Chase to herald the exploits of the Andrews Raid. He was portrayed by actor Stan Jones in the film.

There is a Medal of Honor marker at Brown's grave in Dowling, Ohio. The nearby Ohio Historical marker, erected June 27, 1965, identifies him as Medal of Honor recipient.

In 2012, his descendants went to court to settle a dispute over whether Brown's Medals of Honor should be donated to a museum. As a result of the court settlement, the original 1863 medal was placed in a Veteran's Administration outpatient clinic in Toledo, Ohio. The other medal, issued in 1904 when the medal was redesigned, was donated, along with Brown's papers, to the Southern Museum of Civil War and Locomotive History, Kennesaw, Ga., near the location where the raid began.

== Medal of Honor citation ==
Rank and organization: Private, Company F, 21st Ohio Infantry. Date: April, 1862. Entered service at: Findlay, Ohio Birth: Ohio. Date of issue: September 1863.

The President of the United States of America, in the name of Congress, takes pleasure in presenting the Medal of Honor to Private Wilson W. Brown, United States Army, for extraordinary heroism in April 1862, while serving with Company G, 21st Ohio Infantry, in action during the Andrew's Raid in Georgia. Private Brown was one of the 19 of 22 men (including two civilians) who, by direction of General Mitchell (or Buell), penetrated nearly 200 miles south into enemy territory and captured a railroad train at Big Shanty, Georgia, in an attempt to destroy the bridges and track between Chattanooga and Atlanta.

== See also ==
- List of Medal of Honor recipients
- List of Andrews Raiders
- List of American Civil War Medal of Honor recipients: A–F
