= National Register of Historic Places listings in Whitfield County, Georgia =

This is a list of properties and districts in Whitfield County, Georgia, United States, that are listed on the National Register of Historic Places (NRHP).

This National Park Service list is complete through NPS recent listings posted May 22, 2026.

== Current listings ==
	Name on the Register	Image	Date listed	Location	City or town	Description
1	Thomas A. Berry House	Thomas A. Berry House	April 5, 1984 (#84001303)	506 Hawthorne St. 34°46′33″N 84°57′47″W	Dalton	
2	Ainsworth E. Blunt House	Ainsworth E. Blunt House	July 9, 1980 (#80004460)	506 S. Thornton Ave. 34°46′00″N 84°58′19″W	Dalton	
3	Crown Mill Historic District	Crown Mill Historic District	May 30, 1979 (#79000751)	U.S. 41; 34°47′03″N 84°58′22″W	Dalton	
4	Dalton Commercial Historic District	Dalton Commercial Historic District	December 5, 1988 (#88001831)	Roughly bounded by Hamilton, Pentz, Waugh and Morris Sts.; also roughly centered on Hamilton St., and bounded by S. Thornton Ave., Morris and Hawthorne Sts., and the railroad lines 34°46′16″N 84°58′05″W	Dalton	Second set of boundaries represents a boundary increase of April 19, 2006
5	William C. Martin House	William C. Martin House	July 15, 1982 (#82002497)	101 S. Selvidge St. 34°46′16″N 84°58′15″W	Dalton	
6	Masonic Lodge No. 238	Masonic Lodge No. 238	February 22, 1996 (#96000127)	600 S. Hamilton St. 34°45′57″N 84°58′05″W	Dalton	
7	McCarty Subdivision Historic District	McCarty Subdivision Historic District	July 5, 2002 (#02000714)	Thornton Place, Willow Park Dr., Sunset Cirtcle, and Walnut Ave. 34°45′35″N 84°58′20″W	Dalton	
8	Prater's Mill	Prater's Mill	April 25, 1978 (#78001010)	N of Dalton on GA 2; 34°53′45″N 84°55′20″W	Dalton	
9	A. D. Strickland Store	A. D. Strickland Store	May 10, 2005 (#05000405)	1385 Dawnville Rd. 34°49′17″N 84°52′45″W	Dalton	
10	Thornton Avenue-Murray Hill Historic District	Thornton Avenue-Murray Hill Historic District	June 4, 1992 (#92000669)	Roughly bounded by Crawford St., Thornton Ave., W. Franklin St., Valley Dr., Emory St. and West Hill Cemetery; 34°46′04″N 84°58′28″W	Dalton	
11	Western and Atlantic Depot	Western and Atlantic Depot	April 6, 1978 (#78001009)	Depot St., W end of King St. 34°46′20″N 84°58′02″W	Dalton	Built in 1914, renovated in 2009.
12	Western and Atlantic Railroad Tunnel at Tunnel Hill	Western and Atlantic Railroad Tunnel at Tunnel Hill	January 11, 2002 (#01001431)	Western and Atlantic Railroad; 34°50′19″N 85°01′52″W	Tunnel Hill	
