= Henry Haney =

Henry Haney may refer to:

- Henry Ryan Haney (1835–1878), Ontario physician and political figure
- Henry P. Haney (1846–1923), American last survivor of The Great Locomotive Chase during the American Civil War
