= Dalton station (Louisville and Nashville Railroad) =

Historic railroad depot in Georgia, US

- Western and Atlantic Depot
- U.S. National Register of Historic Places
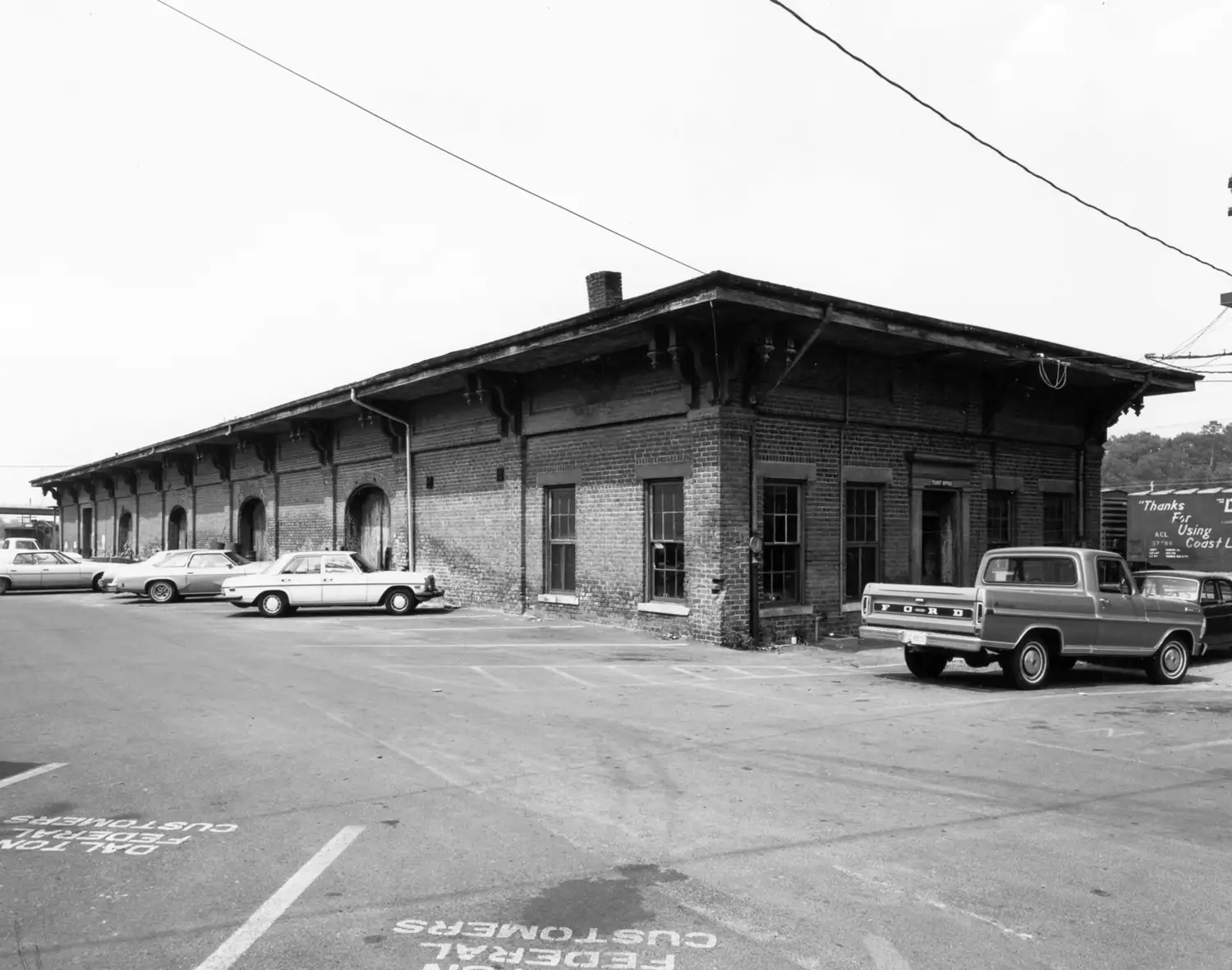
- Street view of the depot, 1978

- Location within Georgia
- Location: Depot St., E end of King St., Dalton, Georgia
- Coordinates: 34°46′20.5″N 84°58′1.6″W
- Area: less than one acre
- Built: 1852
- Built by: Eugene Le Hardy
- NRHP reference No.: 78001009
- Added to NRHP: April 6, 1978

The Western and Atlantic Depot is a historic Western and Atlantic Railroad (W&A) train depot in Dalton, Georgia. It was built in 1852 in the Greek Revival style. The building is the oldest surviving commercial structure in Dalton and is a "fine example" of depot architecture in Georgia in the mid-1800s. It served as both a freight and passenger station.

It was a site used during the Great Locomotive Chase (satirized in a Buster Keaton film, The General) and was a troop transport location during the American Civil War, including during the Battle of Dalton. The depot was added to the National Register of Historic Places on April 6, 1978. It is located on Depot Street at the east end of King Street.

During the Great Locomotive Chase, on April 12, 1862, the Confederacy's pursuit train Texas dropped off 17-year-old Edward Henderson in Dalton to telegraph ahead to Chattanooga to warn that Andrews' Raiders were on their way.

It seems the depot was partially destroyed in 1862 when Union troops captured Dalton and set fire to several buildings; the depot's roof, ornamental brackets, and interior may have been replaced. The station last had passenger service in 1971, when an unnamed Louisville & Nashville Railroad (L&N) train between Evansville, Indiana and Atlanta, Georgia was terminated on the eve of Amtrak's assuming most passenger operations in the United States.

The depot later found use as the Dalton Depot Restaurant and, in 2015, was closed, today the depot is currently abandoned. Another depot, the Dalton freight depot (south of the W&A depot at East Morris Street), was built for the Southern Railway and was recently restored and is home to the Dalton Convention and Visitors Bureau and is a railfan hotspot complete with a Virtual Railfan webcam, scanner, and ATCS monitor.

== Passenger service ==
In mid-20th Century the station had the following Nashville, Chattanooga & St. Louis Railway passenger operations (the NC&StL leased the W&A tracks; in 1957 the NCStL was merged into the L&N):

- Dixie Flyer (Chicago, north branch and St. Louis, west branch–Nashville–Atlanta–Jacksonville–Miami and various Florida Gulf Coast points)
- Dixie Limited (Chicago, north branch and St. Louis, west branch–Nashville–Atlanta–Jacksonville–Miami and various Florida Gulf Coast points)
- Georgian (Chicago, north branch and St. Louis, west branch–Nashville–Atlanta)
- unnamed local night train between Nashville and Atlanta, with timed connection in Nashville to local train to Memphis

Mid-century Southern Railway service consisted of:

- Ponce de Leon (Cincinnati–Atlanta–Florida)
- Royal Palm (Cincinnati–Atlanta–Florida)

== See also ==
- National Register of Historic Places listings in Whitfield County, Georgia

| Preceding station | Louisville and Nashville Railroad | Following station |
|---|---|---|
| Ringgold toward Louisville | Louisville – Atlanta | Calhoun toward Atlanta |
