= The Yonah (locomotive) =

Steam locomotive that participated in the great locomotive chase movie in 1957

Yonah
Type and origin
- Power type: Steam
- Builder: Rogers, Ketchum & Grosvenor
- Serial number: 164
- Build date: 1848
Specifications
- Configuration
  - Whyte: 4-4-0
- Gauge: 5 ft (1,524 mm)
- Cylinders: Two, outside
Career
- Operators: Western and Atlantic Railroad, Cooper Iron Works
- Numbers: none
- Official name: Yonah
- First run: April 1849
- Retired: 1873
- Disposition: Wrote off as condemned and scrapped in 1873

Yonah was a type 4-4-0 steam locomotive that participated in the Great Locomotive Chase of the American Civil War.

== Before the Civil War ==
Built in 1848 by Rogers, Ketchum & Grosvenor in Paterson, New Jersey, the Yonah was the third 4-4-0 locomotive purchased by the Western and Atlantic Railroad. Very little is known about the engine's service life, but it is assumed to have served as a construction train as the railroad was being built from Atlanta, Georgia to Chattanooga, Tennessee, and was believed to have been the first engine to arrive in the latter city.

The engine was likely used for both freight and passenger service for the Western and Atlantic. The Yonah was an example of an early 4-4-0 design, featuring a Haycock firebox design and having its pilot wheels closely spaced with the cylinder placed above at an angle. Thus, the engine was likely relegated to yard service as early as the late 1850s, as the railroad had acquired larger, more powerful locomotives such as the General and the Texas.

== Civil War ==
During the Civil War, the Western and Atlantic had leased the Yonah to the Cooper Iron Works, which operated a short spur to their foundry from a junction at Etowah, Georgia. On April 12, 1862, The General was commandeered by Northerners led by James J. Andrews at Big Shanty (now Kennesaw, Georgia), and passed the Yonah at Etowah as it traveled north towards Chattanooga. Noticing that the Yonah was under full steam and ready for service, the group of raiders aboard the General suggested destroying the engine. However, Andrews declined as he felt doing so would have little impact on the railroad and might draw attention to the raiders and their intentions. Thus, Andrews and his train passed through Etowah without stopping and continued north.

The Yonah was about to make its morning run to the Cooper Works when William Allen Fuller, the conductor whose train had been stolen at Big Shanty, arrived at Etowah. Fuller assumed control of the Yonah, and drove the engine in full steam northward for fifteen miles, arriving in Kingston. Here, Fuller left the Yonah and continued north aboard the Rome Railroad's locomotive, the William R. Smith.

== Later career ==
After the war, the Yonah is believed to have returned to Atlanta, where it was converted into a stationary boiler for the railroad's shop facilities. The W&A's engine roster of January, 1873 listed the engine as "condemned" and "not to appear again on engine roster", and is presumed to have been converted to a stationary engine used to power shop machinery later that year, likely serving in this position until it was eventually scrapped.
