= Thomas A. Berry House =

Historic house in Georgia, United States

- U.S. National Register of Historic Places
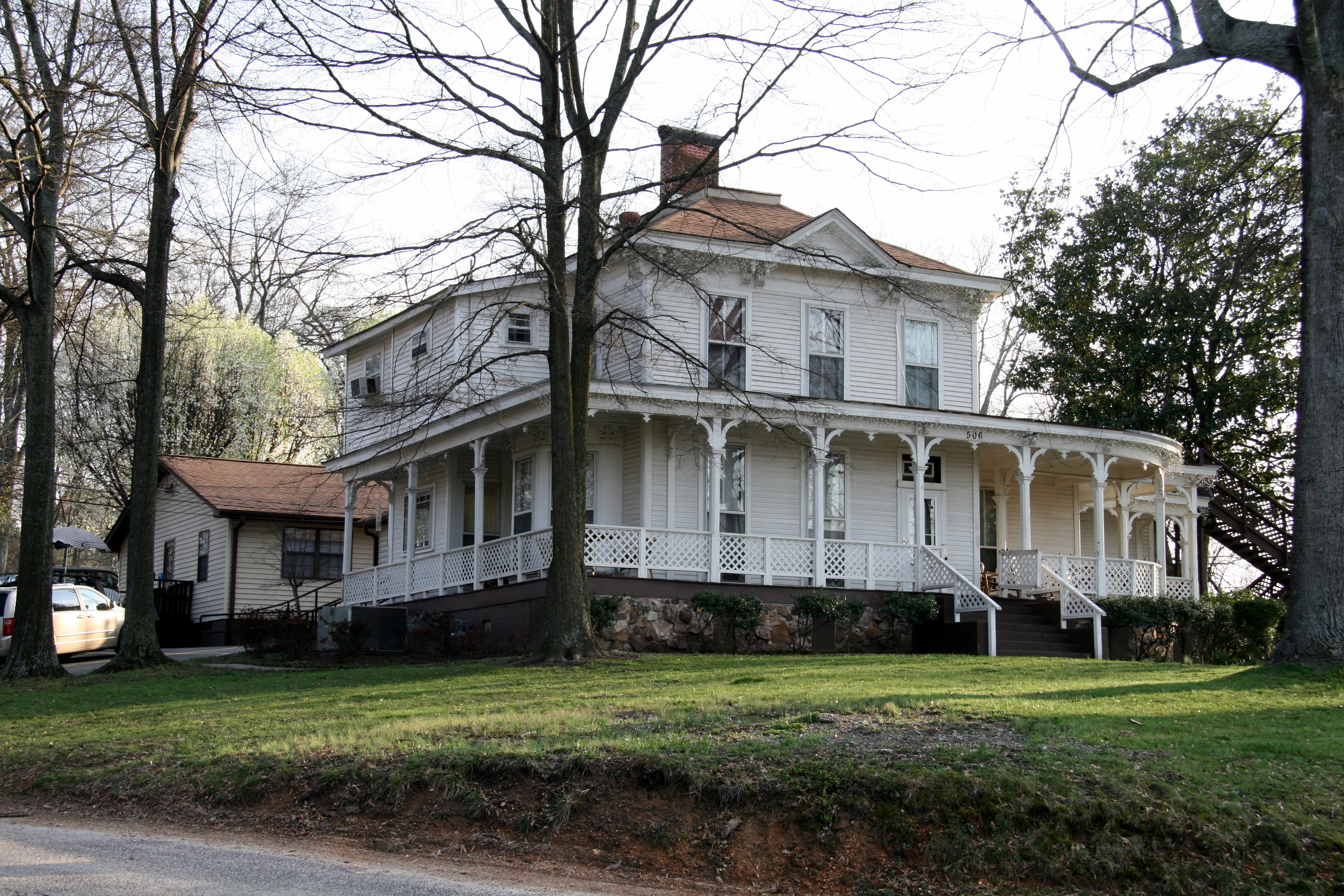
- Thomas A. Berry House

- Location within Georgia
- Location: 506 Hawthorne St., Dalton, Georgia
- Coordinates: 34°46′33″N 84°57′47″W
- Area: 1.4 acres (0.57 ha)
- Built: 1882
- Architectural style: Late Victorian
- NRHP reference No.: 84001303
- Added to NRHP: April 5, 1984

The Thomas A. Berry House is a historic residence in Dalton, Georgia. It was added to the National Register of Historic Places on April 5, 1984. It is located at 506 Hawthorne Street.

The house was built for Thomas A. Berry (1852-1922) and his wife, Mary Elizabeth Bass (1861-1945), as a wedding gift by her father in 1882.

The home's architectural style is considered Late Victorian. It was deemed significant as "a home built in the Victorian Eclectic style that retains its original setting, appearance, similar landscaping, and most significant exterior and interior features....one of a handful of Victorian-era homes that remain in an area that was an affluent section of Dalton during that period." Indicative features of the architectural style include: the house's wraparound porch, decorative brackets on the eaves and the porch, the bay window, stained glass, and interior mantels.

== See also ==
- National Register of Historic Places listings in Whitfield County, Georgia
