= William Pittenger =

William Mills Pittenger
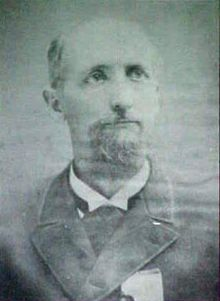
- William Pittenger, 1860s
- Born: January 31, 1840; Knoxville, Ohio, US
- Died: April 24, 1904 (aged 64); Fallbrook, California, US
- Burial place: Odd Fellows Cemetery, Fallbrook, California
- Military career
- Allegiance: United States
- Branch: United States Army
- Service years: 1861–1863
- Rank: Sergeant
- Unit: 2nd Ohio Infantry
- Conflicts: American Civil War • First Battle of Bull Run • Great Locomotive Chase
- Awards: Medal of Honor

William Pittenger (January 31, 1840 – April 24, 1904) was an American soldier during the American Civil War. A member of the Union Army, he was one of the first recipients of the Medal of Honor.

== Biography ==
The son of Thomas and Mary Mills Pittenger, Pittenger studied in the county schools until the age of sixteen. On the outbreak of the Civil War, he enlisted as a private in Company H of the 2nd Ohio Infantry Regiment on April 17, 1861, for three months of service, during which time he participated in the First Battle of Bull Run. He soon re-enlisted in the Army for a three-year term, being mustered in on September 11, 1861, at Camp Dennison, Ohio, and days later joining the reconstituted 2nd Ohio Infantry as a corporal in Company G. Promoted to sergeant on March 13, 1862, Pittenger saw action in Andrews' Raid, also referred to as the Great Locomotive Chase. Captured on April 15, 1862, near Lafayette, Georgia, he escaped execution as a spy and was imprisoned until March 18, 1863, when he was paroled via City Point, Virginia. Following his release and subsequent receipt of the Medal of Honor, Pittenger was promoted to lieutenant and served until impaired health forced him to resign. He was discharged with a disability on August 14, 1863, at Anderson Station, Tennessee. He married Wilhelmina "Winnie" Clyde Osborne of New Brighton, Pennsylvania, on May 17, 1864; they had two sons and four daughters.

Following his discharge from the Army, Pittenger entered the Pittsburgh conference of the Methodist Episcopal Church in 1864. He was transferred to the New Jersey conference in 1870 and worked there until at least 1888. Beginning in 1878 he was a professor at the National School of Elocution and Oratory in Philadelphia. In 1890 he moved with his family to Fallbrook, California. He served as pastor of the Methodist Episcopal church there from 1893 to 1896 and from 1898 to 1899. He bought a home on a 20-acre property; the home is now known as the Pittenger House and is owned by the Fallbrook Historical Society. The family also had a home in town on Fig Street near the church; that home still stands and is now an Alzheimer's day care center. Pittenger helped to organize a high school district in Fallbrook and served as president of the school board.

He is the author of the first account of the raid by a participant, Daring and Suffering, a History of the Great Railroad Adventurers (Philadelphia, 1863; enlarged ed., New York, 1887); Oratory, Sacred and Secular (Philadelphia, 1881); The Interwoven Gospels and Gospel Harmony (1881) and Extempore Speech (1882). He subsequently wrote 3 more books about the raid.

He died in 1904 and was buried at Odd Fellows Cemetery in Fallbrook on April 25, 1904. A Medal of Honor marker was placed on his grave on July 7, 1988.

== Citation ==
Pittenger was awarded the fifth-ever Medal of Honor on March 25, 1863, for his service during the Great Locomotive Chase. His official citation reads: "One of the 19 of 22 men (including 2 civilians) who, by direction of Gen. Mitchell (or Buell), penetrated nearly 200 miles south into enemy territory and captured a railroad train at Big Shanty, Ga., in an attempt to destroy the bridges and tract between Chattanooga and Atlanta."

== See also ==
- List of Andrews Raiders
