= A. D. Strickland Store =

- U.S. National Register of Historic Places
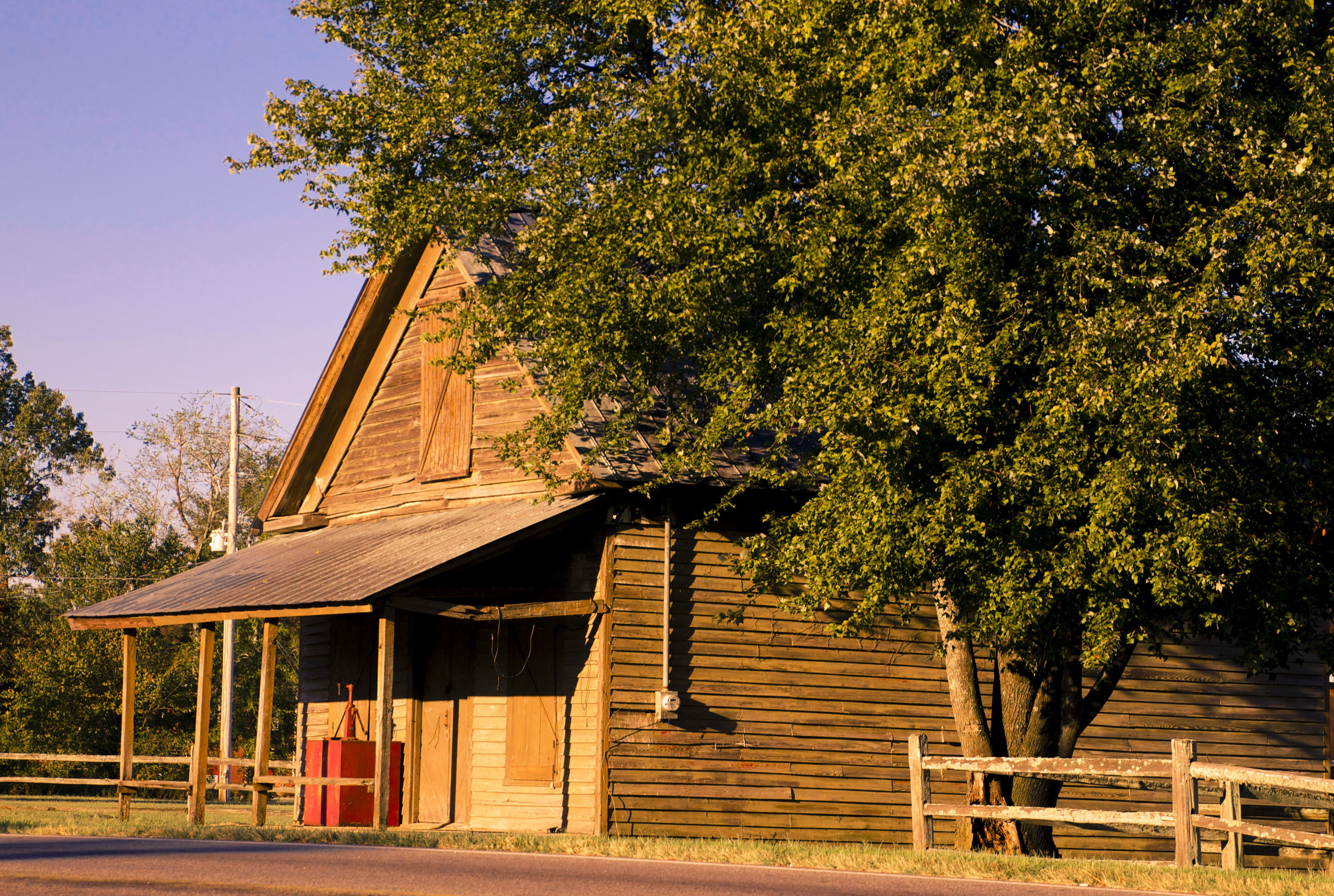

- Location within Georgia Location within the United States
- Location: 1385 Dawnville Road, Dalton, Georgia
- Coordinates: 34.767778°N 84.974444°W
- Built: c. 1878
- NRHP reference No.: 05000405
- Added to NRHP: May 10, 2005

A. D. Strickland Store, also known as Bryant's Store, Dawnville General Merchandise Storekeeper, and J.R. Anderson Store, is a historical building and former rural country store located at 1385 Dawnville Road in Dalton, Georgia, and built c. 1878. These types of rural country general stores were once common and an important part of the social history of Georgia. It has been listed on the National Register of Historic Places since May 10, 2005.

== History ==
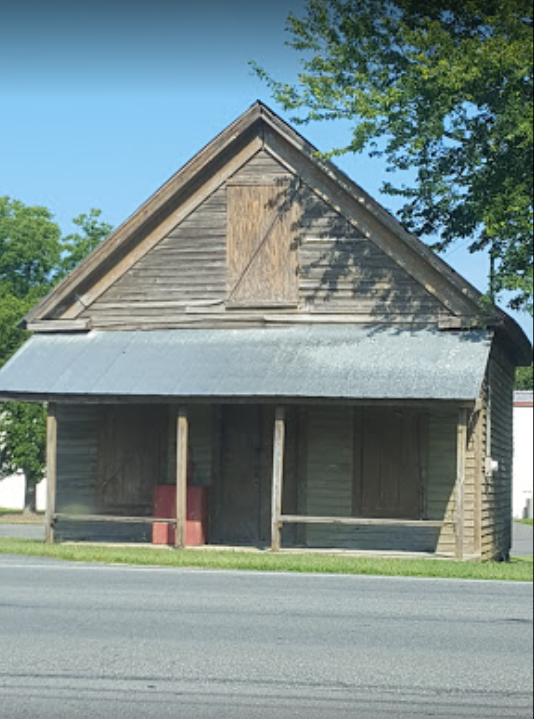
A. D. Strickland Store (2016)

The 130 acre plot of land (that later housed the A. D. Strickland Store) was first owned by Edward F. Dawn starting in 1869. The A. D. Strickland Store was constructed around 1878. The store is a one-story, wood-framed, building and it features a gable-front, a tin roof, a fireplace with chimney, and gable returns on the front and rear facades. By 1870, D.L. King owned the property and at that time it was called, "Dawn's Place". There was a fire in c. 1890, the structure was damaged.

The store ownership and shopkeepers frequently changed over the years. According to the Whitfield County Clerk's office, in 1880, D.L King owner, with G. Caylor storekeeper; in 1900, Joseph Davis owner, with Melvin T. Davls storekeeper; in 1908, E.L. Pearson owner, with A.D. Strickland storekeeper; in 1916, W.C. Bryant owner, with A.D. Strickland storekeeper; in 1956, G.H. Fraker owner, with W.C. Bryant, storekeeper; and by 1972 the store had closed.

The sign reading, "A.D. Strickland, General MSDE & School Supplies" was in the front of the building for decades.

=== Social history of country stores ===
After the American Civil War ending in 1865, stores of this type were made more common because of the rise of sharecropping. The farmers needed a place to purchase goods on credit, until their harvesting season and they could not afford to do so at a traditional bank. These types of stores served as community gathering centers as well as informal banks, post offices, and sometimes the storekeeper would need to act as informal Justice of the peace or tax collector. During winter months when it was cold and snowing, the fireplace in the country store would often have farmers seated around it, discussing community matters.

== See also ==
- Caspiana Plantation Store
- National Register of Historic Places listings in Whitfield County, Georgia
