= The Great Locomotive Chase Festival =

Coordinates: 34.3673°N 84.9350°W

The Great Locomotive Chase Festival is a three-day celebration held in remembering the Great Locomotive Chase of April 12, 1862. It is held the first weekend each October in the center of downtown Adairsville, Georgia.

== Description ==
The festival has arts and crafts booths, historical exhibits, concerts, entertainment, carnival rides, and food booths. The Grand Parade and multiple pageants are held on Friday and Saturday, as well as street dances. Gospel singing takes place on Sunday afternoon.

The festival was founded by the town's Principle Marion Lacey, Alan Aylesworth, and others. Mr. Lacey planned the festival in town to get the small businesses together and provide entertainment for the students each fall.
