= Dowling, Ohio =

- Unincorporated community
- Location within Ohio Location within the United States
- Coordinates: 41°28′42″N 83°35′37″W
- Country: United States
- State: Ohio
- County: Wood
- Elevation: 669 ft (204 m)
- Time zone: UTC-5 (Eastern (EST))
  - Summer (DST): UTC-4 (EDT)
- Area codes: 419 & 567
- GNIS feature ID: 1064551

Dowling is an unincorporated community in Wood County, Ohio, United States. The New Belleville Ridge Cemetery is located in Dowling.

== Notable people ==
- Wilson W. Brown was a soldier and recipient of the Medal of Honor for his role in the Great Locomotive Chase during the American Civil War.
