= Dalton Commercial Historic District =

Historic district in Georgia, United States

- U.S. National Register of Historic Places
- U.S. Historic district
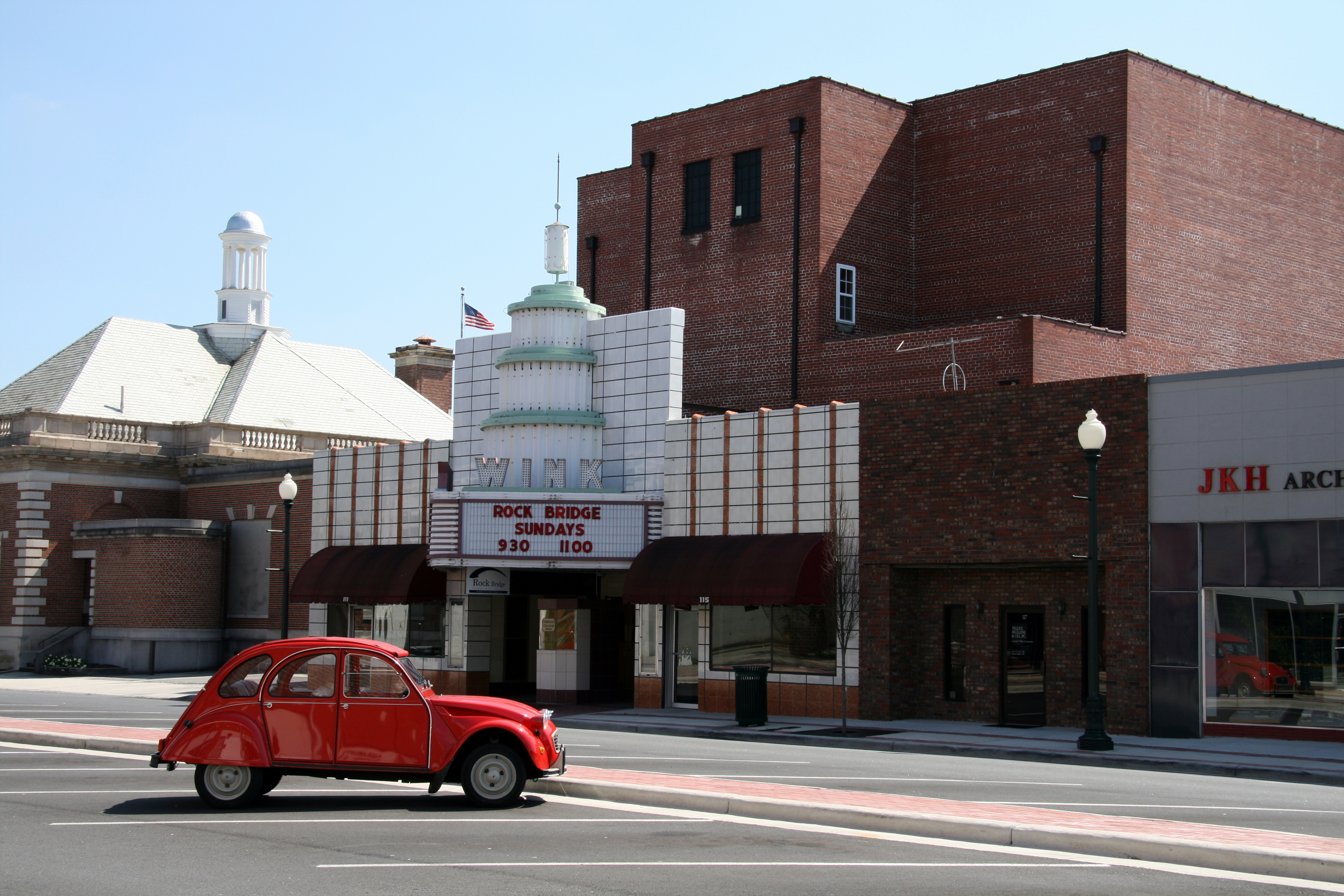
- Wink Theater, the 1938 movie theater featuring Art Moderne styling.

- Location within Georgia Location within the United States
- Location: Roughly bounded by Hamilton, Pentz, Waugh and Morris Sts., (original); Roughly centered on Hamilton St., and bounded by S. Thornton Ave., Morris and Hawthorne Sts., and RR lines, (increase); Dalton, Georgia
- Coordinates: 34°46′16″N 84°58′5″W
- Built: 1846 (increase)
- Architectural style: Late 19th and Early 20th Century American Movements, Late 19th and 20th Century Revivals, Late Victorian (original); Italianate, Colonial Revival (increase)
- NRHP reference No.: 88001831 (original); 06000288 (increase)

Significant dates
- Added to NRHP: December 5, 1988 (original)
- Boundary increase: April 19, 2006 (increase)

Dalton Commercial Historic District is a historic district in Dalton, Georgia that was listed on the National Register of Historic Places (NRHP) in 1988. Its boundaries were expanded in 2006.

It includes the Western and Atlantic Depot, which is separately listed on the NRHP, and course of railway that was site of the Great Locomotive Chase of 1862. The 1852-built railroad depot, at the end of King Street, is Italianate in style and is the oldest building in the district. A 1938-built movie theater is the newest of the contributing resources.

Per NRIS, the original listing included 20 acres (8.1 ha) with 78 contributing buildings and one other contributing structure and one contributing object.

The district covers a central business district arranged on a gridiron street plan that is not unlike that of other small Georgia cities. It includes historic government buildings, commercial buildings, and transportation-related facilities.

Its three government buildings are the Georgian Revival-styled old Federal Post Office and city hall, and the county fire station, "which represent the presence of federal and local government in Dalton during the early 20th century. City hall, built in 1937, is one of the few major buildings built in Dalton During the 1930s and, as such, reflects the economic stimulation that the WPA and other federal programs were designed to provide during the Depression. These buildings represent three different levels of government and their day-to-day operations in the community."

It includes the Wink Theater, a 1938 movie theater featuring Art Moderne styling.

It also captures industry that made Dalton the "'Tufted Bedspread Capital of the World' in the 1930s and 1940s. This was the beginning of the tufted carpet industry for Dalton which today has developed into a worldwide carpet industry."

Or per the increase document, the original listing included 85 contributing buildings, 40 non-contributing buildings, and one contributing object. The object was the 15 feet (4.6 m) bronze statue of Confederate General Joseph E. Johnston emplaced on Crawford Street in 1912.

Per NRIS, the increase included 5 acres (2.0 ha) with 33 contributing buildings. And it included Italianate and Colonial Revival architecture.

Or per the increase document, the increase added 27 contributing buildings, and subtracted 19 non-contributing ones.
