= Calhoun Downtown Historic District =

Historic district in Georgia, United States

- U.S. National Register of Historic Places
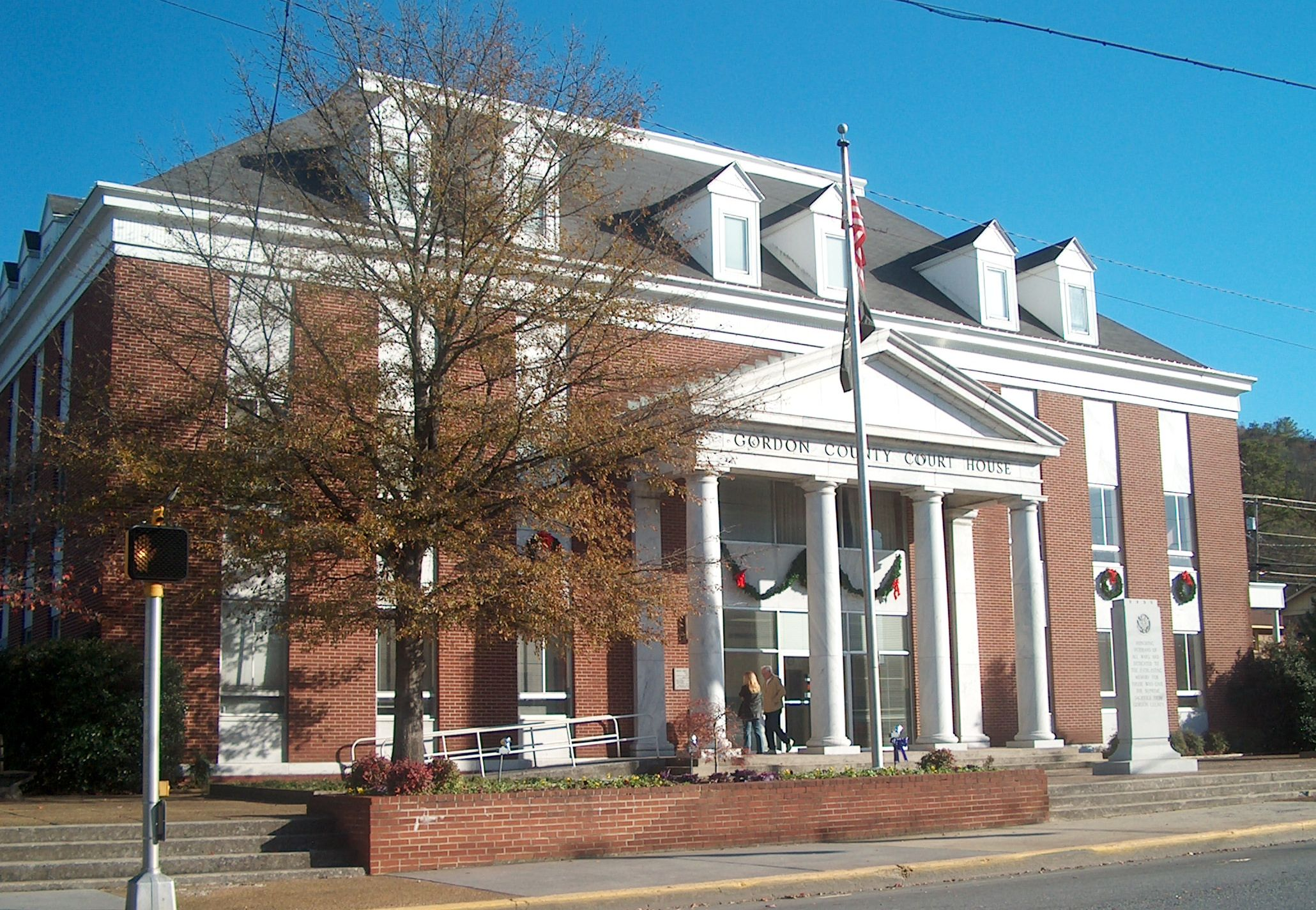
- Gordon County Courthouse

- Location within Georgia Location within the United States
- Location: Jct. of Court and Wall Sts., Calhoun, Georgia
- Coordinates: 34°30′09″N 84°57′05″W
- Area: 22 acres (8.9 ha)
- Built: 1877
- Architect: William F. Cann, others
- Architectural style: Late 19th And 20th Century Revivals, Italianate
- NRHP reference No.: 11000332
- Added to NRHP: June 8, 2011

The Calhoun Downtown Historic District in Calhoun, Georgia is a 22 acres (8.9 ha) area which was listed on the National Register of Historic Places in 2011. The district includes 44 contributing buildings and 12 non-contributing ones.

It includes works by architect William F. Cann and others. In the Great Locomotive Chase, the train stopped here.

It includes:

- old U.S. Post Office building, which in 2011 was serving as the Calhoun police station
- Gordon County Courthouse (1962)
