= Henry P. Haney =

Last survivor of the Great Locomotive Chase

- Born: November 25, 1846
- Died: November 19, 1923 (aged 76)

Henry P. Haney (November 25, 1846 – November 19, 1923) was an American last survivor of The Great Locomotive Chase during the American Civil War. He was a 15-year-old fireman on the "Texas", the locomotive used by the "General's" crew to pursue the "General" on the second half of the chase after it was stolen by the Andrews Raiders.
