= Acworth Downtown Historic District =

Historic district in Georgia, United States

- U.S. National Register of Historic Places
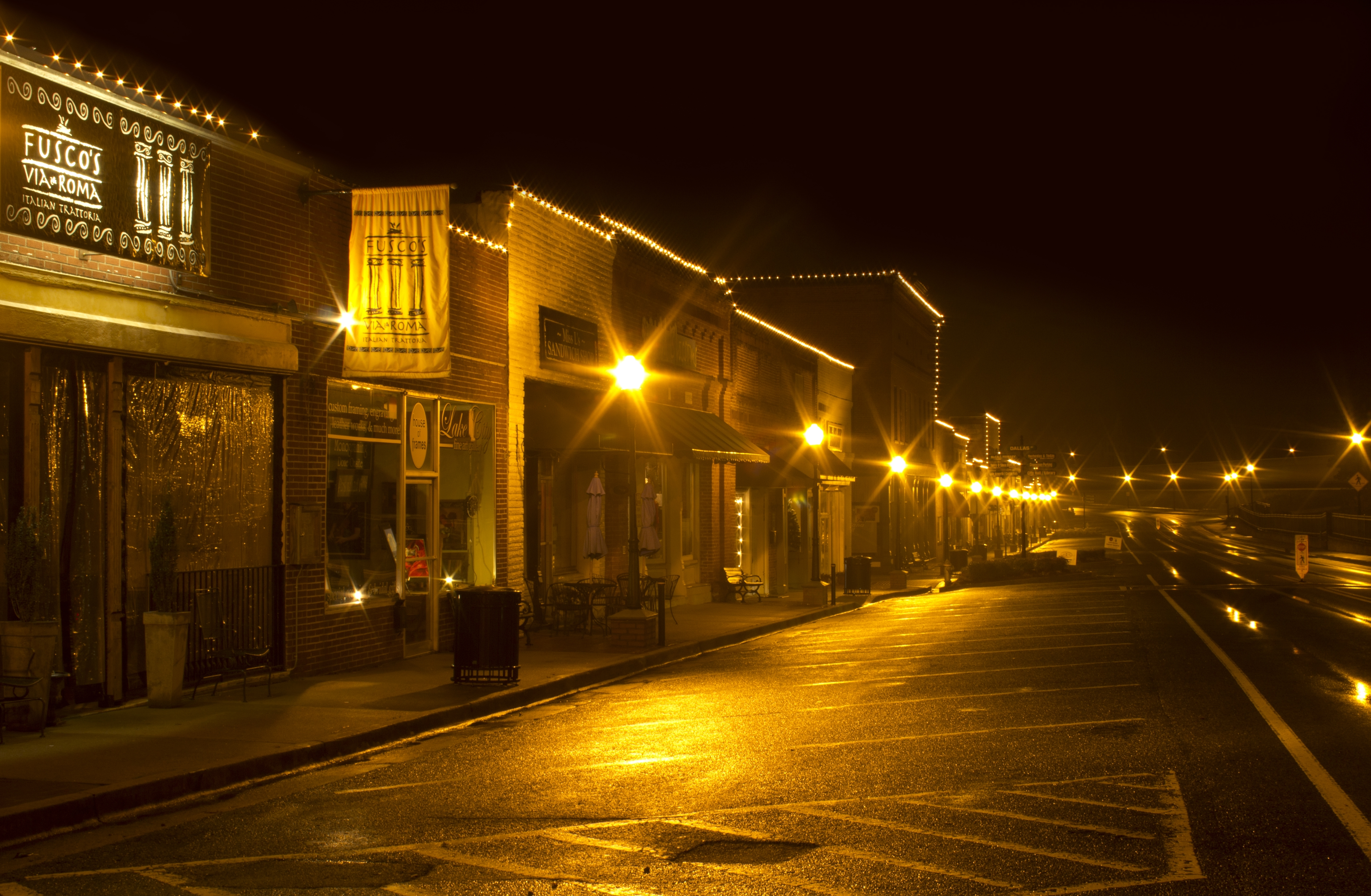

- Location within Georgia
- Location: Roughly bounded by Southside Dr., Federal and Lemon Sts, and Senator Richard B. Russell Ave., Acworth, Georgia
- Coordinates: 34°03′58″N 84°40′44″W
- Area: 14 acres (5.7 ha)
- Built: 1842
- Architectural style: Early Commercial, International Style
- NRHP reference No.: 06000286
- Added to NRHP: April 19, 2006

The Acworth Downtown Historic District, in Acworth, Georgia, is a historic district roughly bounded by Southside Dr., Federal and Lemon Sts, and Senator Richard B. Russell Ave. It is 14 acres (5.7 ha) in area and includes 32 contributing buildings and a contributing structure.

It is a linear district along Main Street and the CSX railway tracks.
