= Battle of Dalton =

Battle of Dalton may refer to the following battles fought near Dalton in Whitefield County, Georgia during the American Civil War:

- First Battle of Dalton, February 22–27, 1864
- Second Battle of Dalton, August 14–15, 1864

== See also ==
- Battle of Rocky Face Ridge, operations near Dalton on or about May 7, 1864; an early stage in Sherman's Atlanta campaign
- Georgia in the American Civil War
