= William Allen Fuller =

American railroad conductor (1836–1905)

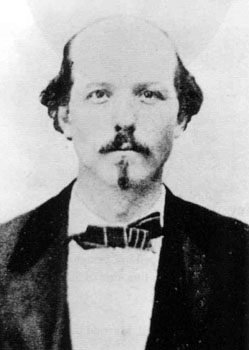
- Born: April 15, 1836; Henry County, Georgia, U.S.
- Died: December 28, 1905 (aged 69); Atlanta, Georgia, U.S.
- Resting place: Oakland Cemetery, Georgia, U.S. 33°44′55″N 84°22′17″W
- Known for: Great Locomotive Chase
- Spouses: Lulu Asher (m. 1860; died 1872); Susan C. Alford (m. 1874)
- Children: 10

William Allen Fuller (April 15, 1836 – December 28, 1905) was a conductor on the Western & Atlantic Railroad during the American Civil War era. He was most noted for his role in the 1862 Great Locomotive Chase, a daring sabotage mission and raid conducted by soldiers of the Union Army in northern Georgia. Fuller's determined pursuit prevented the Union agents from driving a captured train north to Tennessee and the Union lines.

== Early life ==
Fuller was born at Morrow Station in rural Henry County, Georgia, to William Alexander Fuller. He was educated in local schools and married quite young.

He began working for the Western & Atlantic Railroad on September 8, 1855, at the age of 19. By the beginning of the Civil War in 1861, Fuller served as a conductor on trains running from Atlanta.

== Great Locomotive Chase ==
On the morning of April 12, 1862, the locomotive General was stopped at Big Shanty (now Kennesaw, Georgia) so that the crew and passengers could have breakfast. While they were dining in the Lacey Hotel, Federal spy James J. Andrews and his party of Union volunteers commandeered the General, its tender, and a few boxcars and steamed northward. An astonished Fuller chased the stolen train by foot and then by handcar. At Etowah, Fuller commandeered another locomotive, the old Yonah, and took it north to Kingston, Georgia, keeping up the pressure on Andrews. The raiders began raising rails and cutting telegraph wires to delay their pursuers, although an attempt to burn a covered bridge failed. At Kingston, Fuller took command of the newer, faster William R. Smith and headed north to Adairsville. The tracks two miles (3 km) south of Adairsville were broken by the raiders and Fuller had to run the two miles by foot.

Once at Adairsville, the determined Fuller appropriated the southbound locomotive Texas and again chased the General, using the Texas operated in reverse. Concurrently, Andrews' Raiders were cutting the telegraph wires so no transmissions could go through to Chattanooga. With the Texas still chasing the General in reverse, the pair of trains sped through Dalton and Tunnel Hill, to the surprise of local residents and railroad workers.

At milepost 116.3 (north of Ringgold), Andrews' Raiders abandoned the General and scattered from the locomotive just a few miles short of their destination of Chattanooga. Andrews and most of his raiders were soon captured and taken to Atlanta for trial. After they were found guilty of espionage and conspiracy, Andrews and several members of his party were executed by hanging.

The Georgia State Assembly later noted that, "The conduct of Mr. Fuller, the Conductor, and of some others in the hazardous pursuit, while the spies were in possession of the train, deserves the highest commendation and entitles them to the consideration of the General Assembly."

Following his successful pursuit of Andrews' Raiders, Fuller was commissioned by Governor Joseph E. Brown on August 3, 1863, for a six-month term as a captain in the Independent State Road Guards. His commission was renewed for another term in February 1864. Fuller hired and trained militia to serve as guards on Georgia's railroads to prevent a recurrence of Andrews' Raid.

== After the War ==
Following the Civil War, Fuller served as the Chief Marshal for the city of Atlanta from September to October 1865. Fuller resigned from the W&ARR in January 1870 to take a position with the Macon & Western Railroad for two years. His first wife, Lulu (Asher) Fuller, died in 1872. None of their four children had survived infancy. He remarried in 1874 (to Susan C. Alford, who bore him five children). Fuller returned to work for the Western & Atlantic in 1876. In his later years, he became a merchant in Atlanta.

Fuller died in Atlanta, 1905, and was buried in the city's Oakland Cemetery. His striking monument reads: "On April 12, 1862, Captain Fuller pursued and after a race of 90 miles, from Big Shanty northward on the Western & Atlantic Railroad, re-captured the historic war-engine "General" which had been seized by 22 Federal soldiers in disguise, thereby preventing the destruction of the bridges of the railroad and the consequent dismemberment of the Confederacy."

In 1950, the state of Georgia commissioned a special gold medal in honor of Fuller's work during the Great Locomotive Chase. It was presented to his son, William Alford Fuller, on May 15.
