= Calhoun station =

Historic train station in Georgia, US

- Calhoun Depot
- U.S. National Register of Historic Places
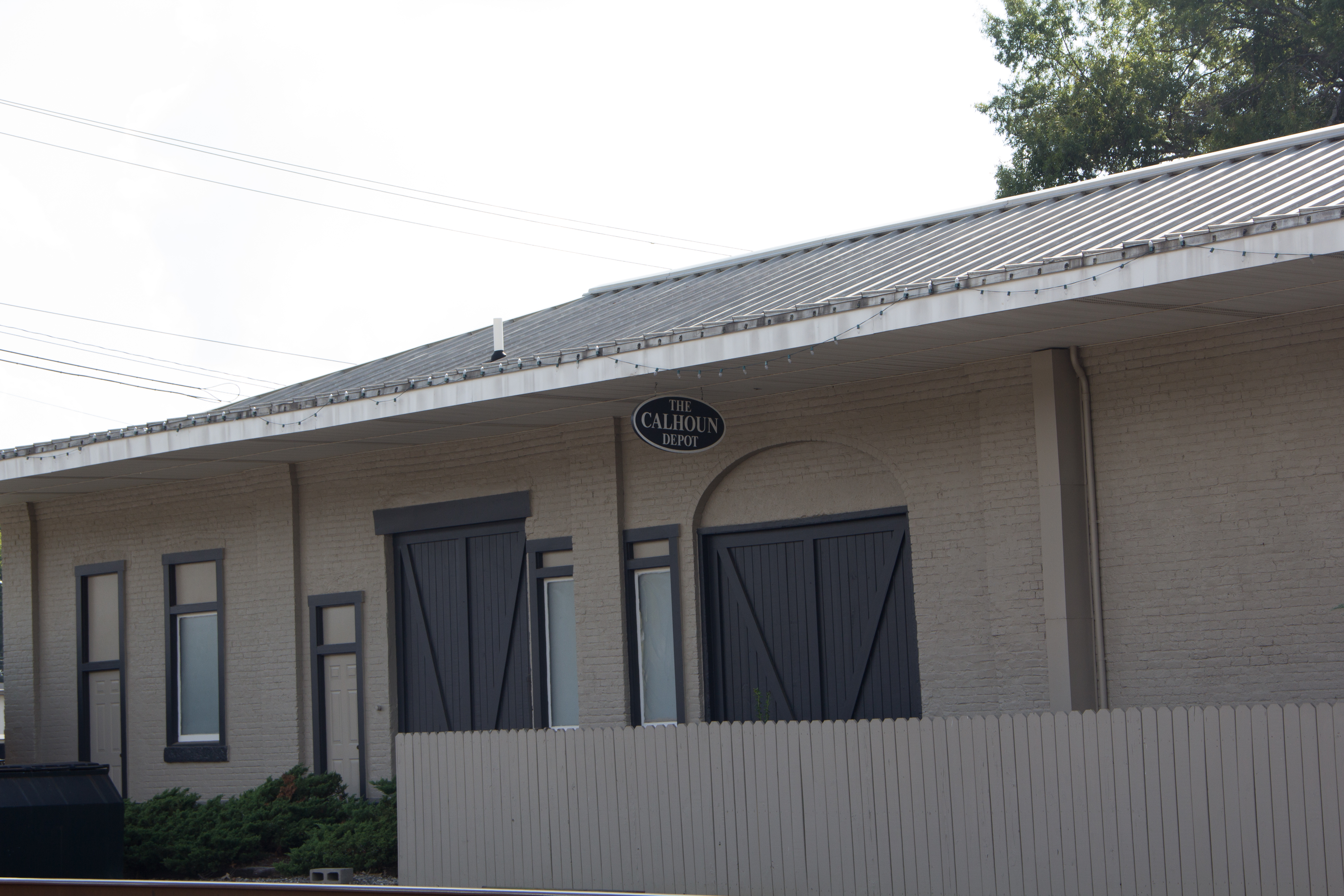

- Location within Georgia Location within the United States
- Location: Between Court and Oothcalooga Sts., Calhoun, Georgia
- Coordinates: 34°30′6″N 84°57′12″W
- Area: less than one acre
- Built: 1852-53
- Built by: Western & Atlantic Railroad
- NRHP reference No.: 82002422
- Added to NRHP: August 26, 1982

The Calhoun Depot was a railway station of the Western & Atlantic Railroad that was built by the State of Georgia during 1852–53 in Calhoun, Georgia. Unusual for railroads, the Western & Atlantic Railroad was owned and operated by a U.S. state. Calhoun is on its route built from Atlanta, Georgia to Chattanooga, Tennessee. Like other brick or stone depots on the line, the Calhoun Depot was involved in but survived the American Civil War. It was part of the Great Locomotive Chase.

It was listed on the NRHP in 1982. It was deemed significant architecturally "because it represents an antebellum depot designed and built to serve its essential functions. Its simple lines and fundamental, utilitarian styling exemplifies the early, unpretentious frontier times of North Georgia in which it was created." The depot was also deemed significant in transportation history "because it symbolizes the effect the arrival of the railroad had on the area."

The town of Calhoun, which grew from a settlement known as Oothcalooga, is in area that was taken from the Cherokee Nation in the 1830s. Its location was in Cass County and then Bartow County. At some point it became a railroad stop and finally in 1850 it became the first county seat of new Gordon County. Oothcalooga was soon renamed to Calhoun.

According to its NRHP nomination, "The selection of the site for a railroad stop was a prime factor in its later becoming the county seat. The railroad served as a major travel artery, as well as a supply line during the Civil War. It was also part of one of the war's most famous events, during the Great Locomotive Chase."

After 1890, the State-owned W & A Line was leased to the L & N Railroad. The last passenger train making stops in Calhoun was the L&N's Dixie Flyer, which made its last stop there in 1965. As of 1982, freight service continued on the line.

Preceding station	Nashville, Chattanooga and St. Louis Railway	Following station
Resaca toward Memphis	Main Line	McDaniels toward Atlanta
