= Masonic Lodge No. 238 =

- U.S. National Register of Historic Places
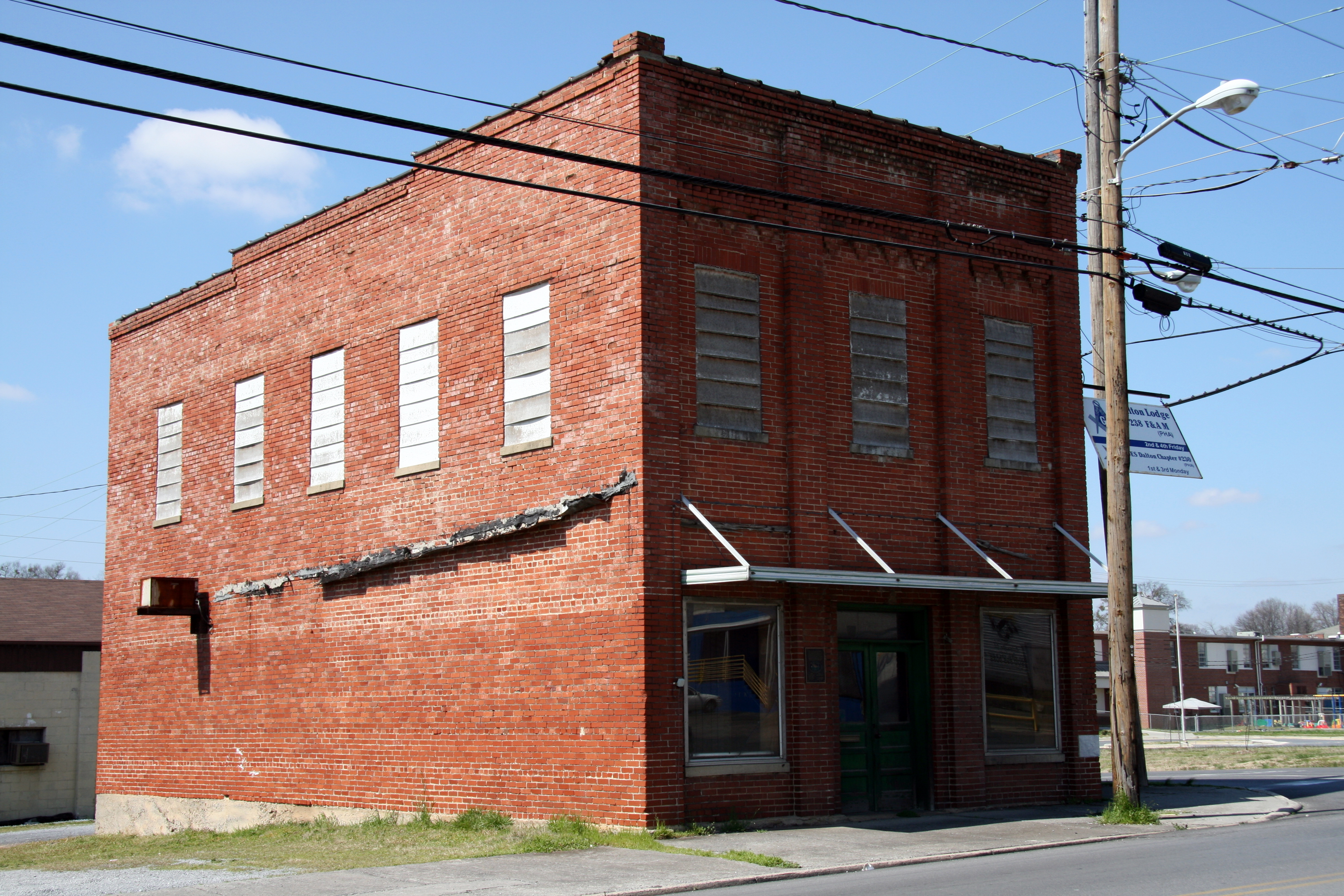

- Location within Georgia Location within the United States
- Location: 600 S. Hamilton St., Dalton, Georgia
- Coordinates: 34°45′57″N 84°58′5″W
- Area: less than one acre
- Built: 1915
- Architect: Hanson, Dutch, et al.; Smith, Dan, et al.
- NRHP reference No.: 96000127
- Added to NRHP: February 22, 1996

The Masonic Lodge No. 238 (also known as Masonic Hall), is a historic building in Dalton, Georgia. it was built in 1915. It was listed on the National Register of Historic Places in 1996.

It is the home of Dalton Lodge No. 238, Prince Hall Affiliation
