= Ringgold Depot =

- U.S. National Register of Historic Places
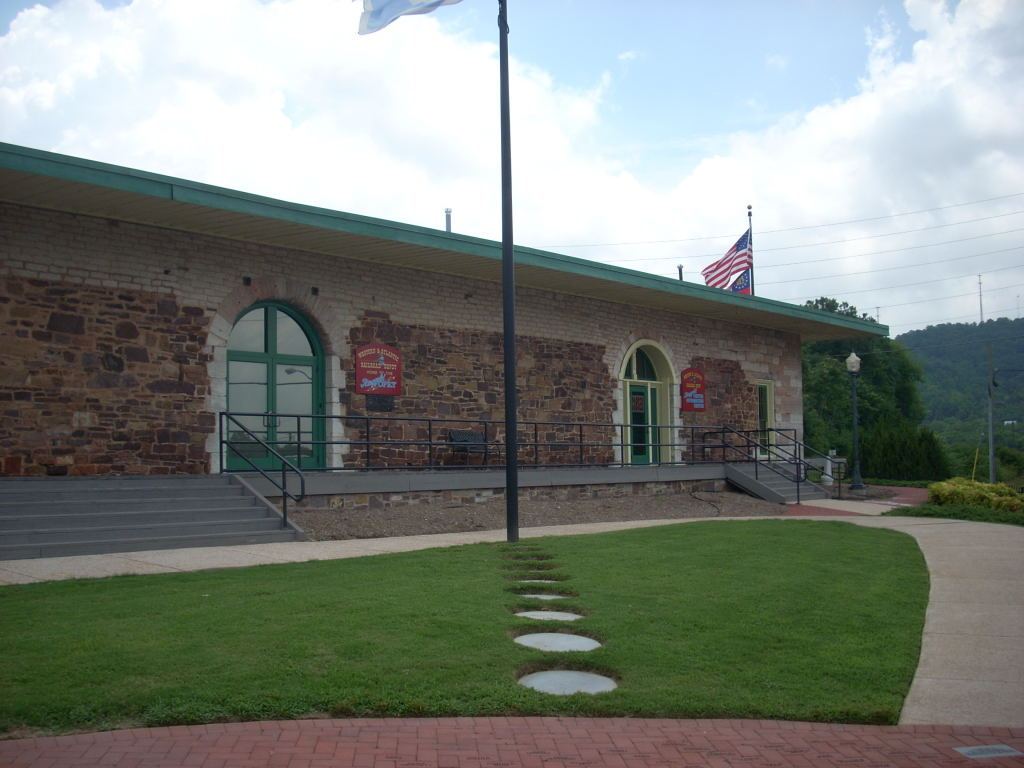

- Location within Georgia Location within the United States
- Location: U.S. 41, Ringgold, Georgia
- Coordinates: 34°54′55″N 85°06′28″W
- Area: 1 acre (0.40 ha)
- Built: c. 1850
- Built by: Garrett V. Maegeram (stonemason); M.G. Collins (carpenter)
- NRHP reference No.: 78000968
- Added to NRHP: November 30, 1978

The Ringgold Depot, on what is now U.S. Route 41 in Ringgold, Georgia, was listed on the National Register of Historic Places in 1978.

It is a 33 by 192 feet (10 m × 59 m) stone depot built as a station on the Western and Atlantic Railroad around 1850. Its 14 inches (0.36 m) sandstone walls were damaged in the American Civil War, and repairs used limestone blocks.

Preceding station	Nashville, Chattanooga and St. Louis Railway	Following station
Chickamauga toward Memphis	Main Line	Tunnel Hill toward Atlanta
