= William Taylor House (Resaca, Georgia) =

Historic house in Georgia, United States

- U.S. National Register of Historic Places
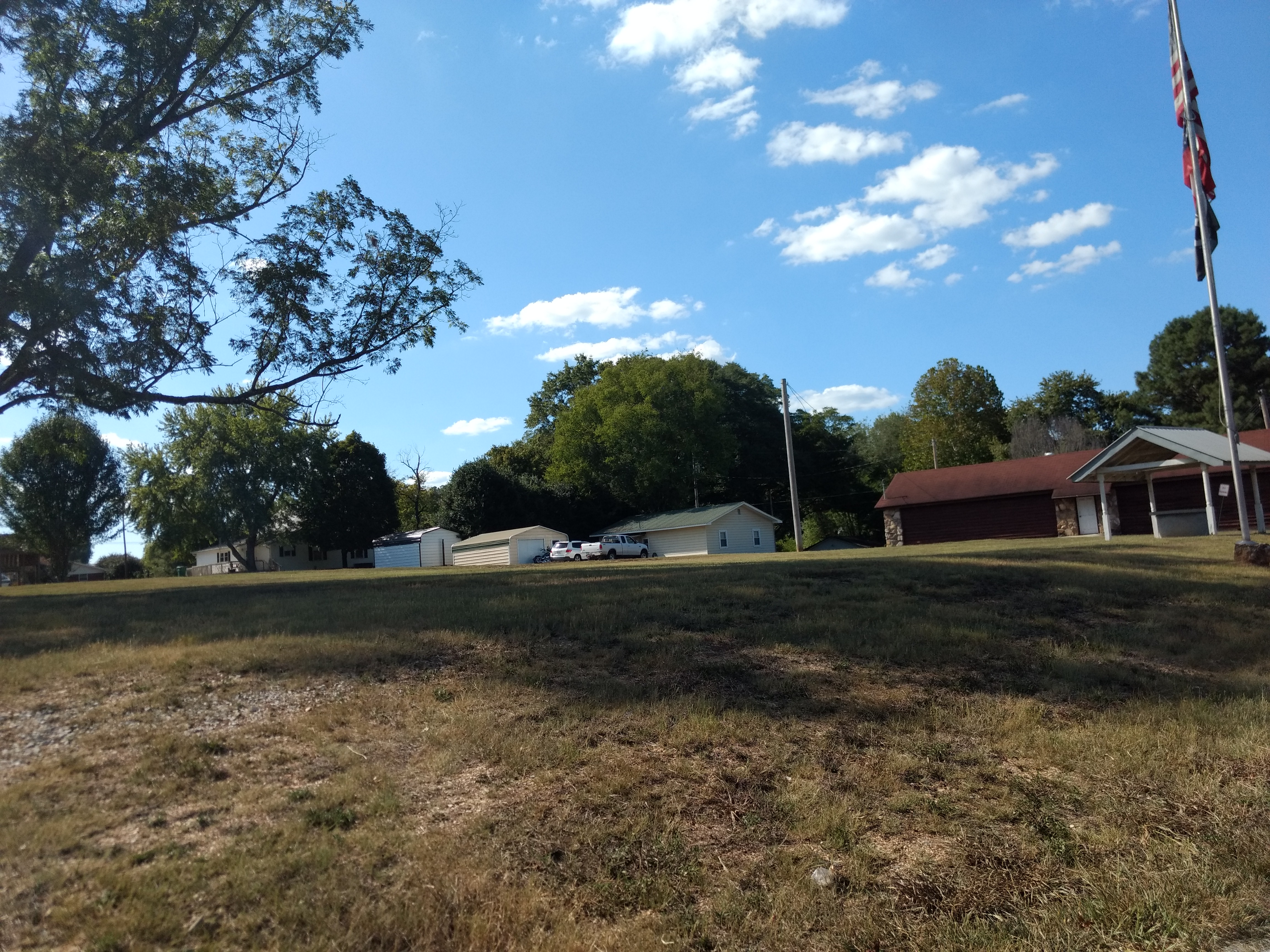
- Location of the William Taylor House in 2019

- Location within Georgia Location within the United States
- Location: 3032 Battlefield Parkway, Resaca, Georgia
- Coordinates: 34.57981°N 84.94343°W
- Area: Less than one acre
- Built: 1913
- Architect: William M. Taylor
- Architectural style: Central hall
- NRHP reference No.: 02001414
- Added to NRHP: November 27, 2002

The William Taylor House in Resaca, Georgia is a historic home, built in 1913, that was used as the town hall of Resaca before being torn down. It was listed on the National Register of Historic Places in 2002.

The house was deemed significant for its association with William Taylor, veteran of the American Civil War. And it was also deemed significant for its architecture, as a good example of a central hall plan house.

William Taylor lived in the house for the last 30 years of his life. In 1938, at age almost 90, he attended the 75th anniversary of the Battle of Gettysburg, where he was among 60 veterans from Georgia, and among the seven of those who fought for the Union.

Taylor was born on August 22, 1849, and he died October 15, 1944. Taylor is interred beside his second wife Laura in Resaca cemetery adjacent to the Resaca First Baptist Church .
