= Ringgold Gap Battlefield =

US Civil War battlefield

- U.S. National Register of Historic Places
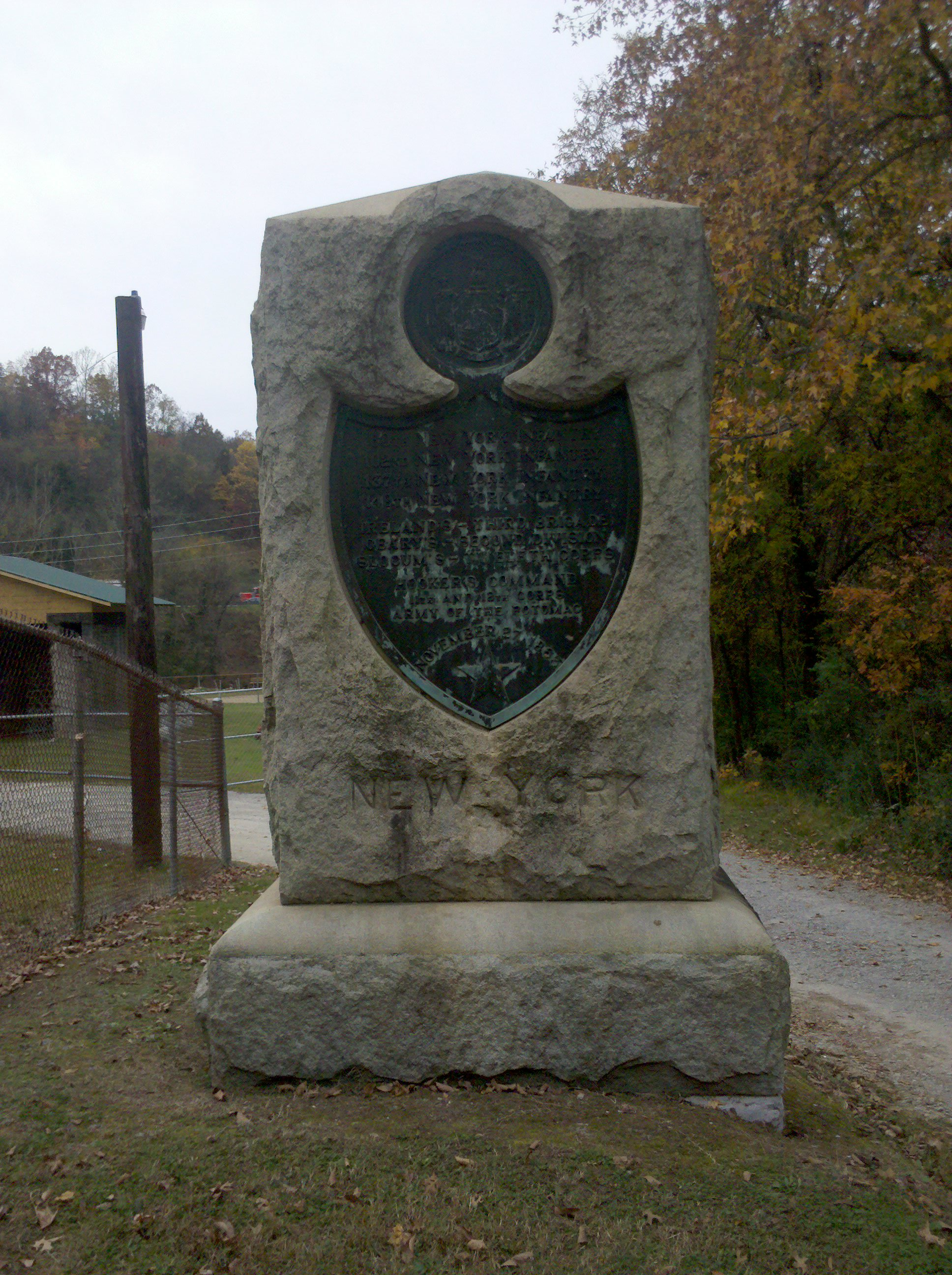
- New York monument at site

- Location within Georgia Location within the United States
- Location: White Oak Mountain, E of Ringgold and N of I75, and the NE face of Taylor Ridge S of I75, Ringgold, Georgia
- Coordinates: 34°55′23.53″N 85°5′58.46″W
- Area: 110 acres (45 ha)
- MPS: Chickamauga-Chattanooga Civil War-Related Sites in Georgia and Tennessee MPS
- NRHP reference No.: 11000079
- Added to NRHP: March 12, 2011

The Ringgold Gap Battlefield, in Catoosa County, Georgia, preserves the scene of the Battle of Ringgold Gap in the American Civil War.

According to the National Park Service:

At Ringgold Gap, a pass nestled between White Oak Mountain and Taylor Ridge, Major General Patrick Cleburne, leader of the Confederate Army of Tennessee, successfully halted Union Army advances through Georgia. The outcome of this November 1863 battle prolonged the Civil War and significantly delayed Federal troops from reaching the Confederate stronghold of Atlanta. The engagement between Major Generals Hooker and Cleburne led to Cleburne's fame as the Confederacy's "Stonewall of the West." Major General Cleburne protected the pass with strategic troop placement and concealment. The Army of Tennessee did not open fire until Union troops were within 100 yards, resulting in the loss of 500 Union troops; many of both sides were wounded. Ringgold Gap Battlefield listing also includes a monument erected in 1898 by the state of New York to recognize the New York Brigade's (Union) participation in the battle, and the Ringgold Gap Wayside Park. The Works Progress Administration (WPA) begun the Ringgold Gap Wayside Park project in 1939 and the National Park Service completed the wayside signs and park area. The bronze plaques commemorate the historic event at this site and its role in two important campaigns of the Civil War, the Chickamauga-Chattanooga Campaign and the Atlanta campaign.

The site was listed on the U.S. National Register of Historic Places on March 12, 2011. The listing was announced as the featured listing in the National Park Service's weekly list of March 18, 2011.

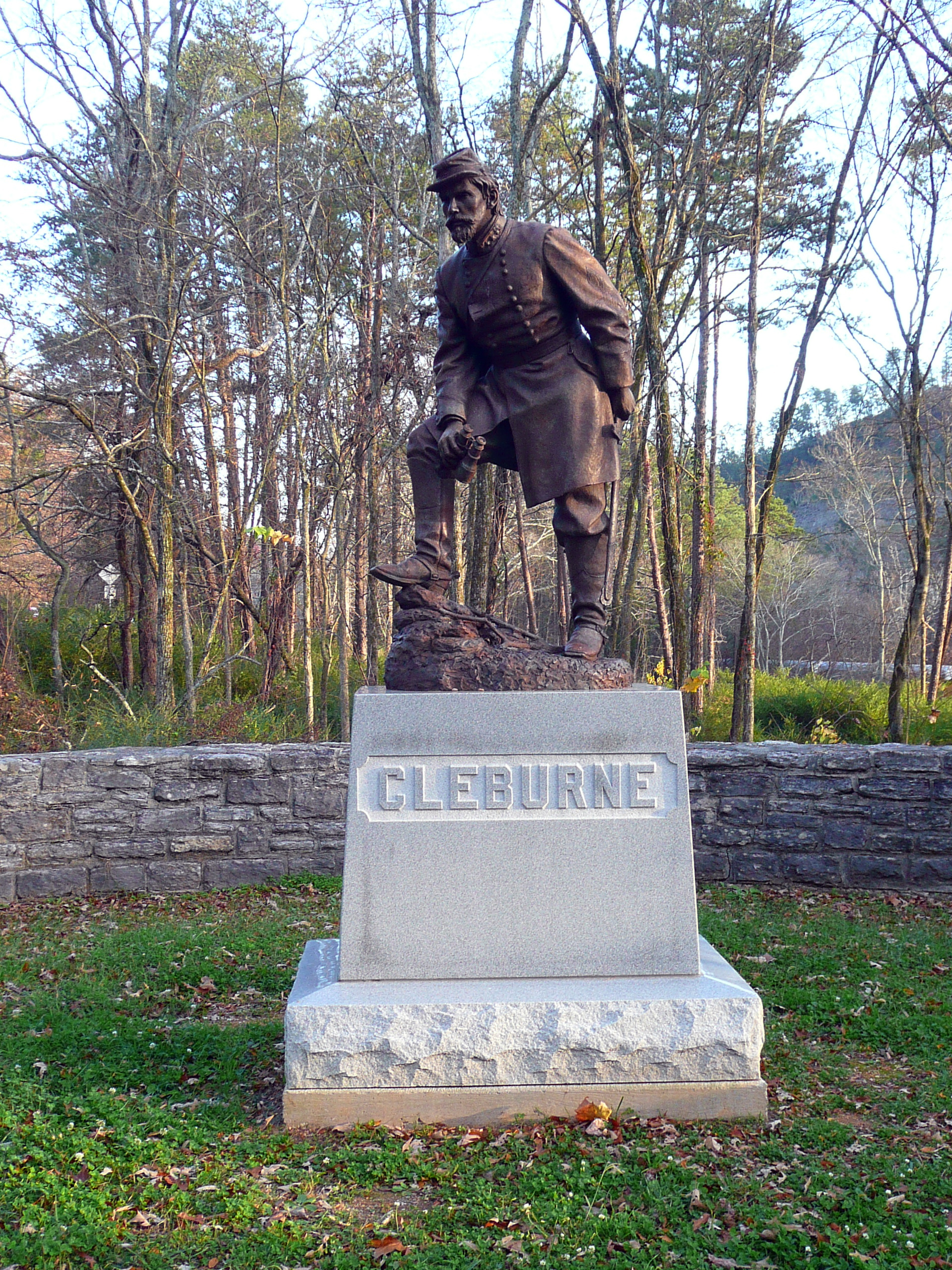
Cleburne's statue at Ringgold Gap, Georgia by sculptor Ron Tunison.

A small pocket park in Ringgold Gap commemorates the battle. A monument to soldiers from New York who sustained heavy casualties stands near Tiger Creek at the Ringgold Water Treatment Plant. A new monument in honor of Major General Patrick Cleburne and his men is located in the small pocket park. The nearby Western and Atlantic Depot still shows scars from the damage it received from artillery fire during the battle. The Ringgold Gap Battlefield was listed on the National Register of Historic Places in 2011.
