= Ringgold Commercial Historic District =

Historic district in Georgia, United States

- U.S. National Register of Historic Places
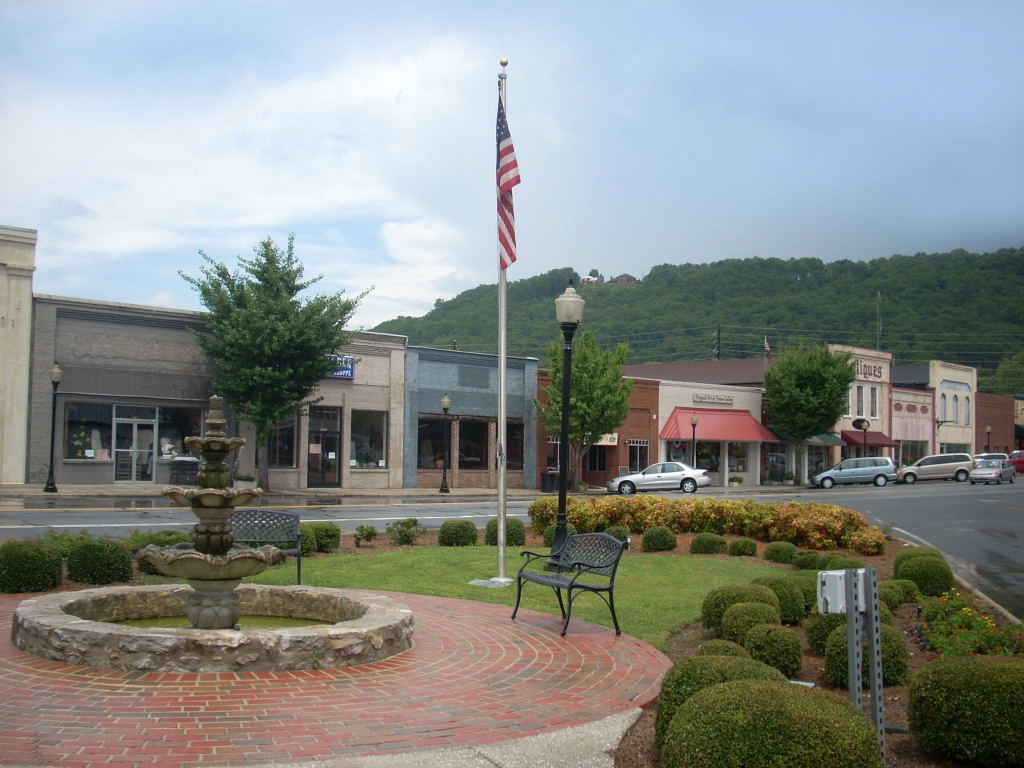

- Location within Georgia
- Location: Nashville St. between Tennessee and Depot Sts., Ringgold, Georgia
- Coordinates: 34°54′56″N 85°06′30″W
- Area: less than one acre
- Built: c.1860
- Architectural style: Greek Revival, Stripped Classical
- NRHP reference No.: 91002001
- Added to NRHP: January 30, 1992

The Ringgold Commercial Historic District, in Ringgold, Georgia, is a historic district which was listed on the National Register of Historic Places in 1992.

It includes seven contributing buildings and three non-contributing ones, on Nashville St. between Tennessee and Depot Streets. The oldest one was built around 1860.
