= William Hunter Campbell =

American Civil War spy and sabotuer (1839–1862)

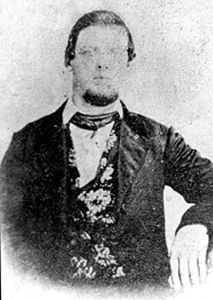
- Born: September 9, 1839; Carroll County, Ohio
- Died: June 18, 1862 (aged 22); Atlanta, Georgia
- Cause of death: Execution by hanging
- Resting place: Chattanooga National Cemetery
- Known for: executed as a civilian spy for Great Locomotive Chase

William Hunter Campbell (September 9, 1839 – June 18, 1862) was an Ohio civilian who worked for the Union Army during the early years of the American Civil War. He participated in a daring raid behind enemy lines on the Western and Atlantic Railroad, known famously as the Great Locomotive Chase. The mission failed and Campbell and seven fellow raiders were executed by the Confederates on the charge of spying.

William Hunter Campbell was born in Fox Township, Carroll County, Ohio to Samuel and Sarah Hunter Campbell. Henry Howe says in Historical Collections of Ohio that his mother was named Jane Morgan, a cousin of Confederate General John Hunt Morgan.

Campbell was visiting friends with 2nd Ohio Infantry in Kentucky in 1862 when he was recruited to participate in a raid to steal a Confederate locomotive and bring it to Federal lines. James J. Andrews, also a civilian, recruited Campbell and 22 soldiers from three Ohio regiments, the 2nd, 21st and 33rd Ohio Infantry. Another participant described Campbell : "He was a man of two hundred twenty pounds, handsome as Apollo, and of immense physical strength, which he was slow to use when roused, though good-natured and clever in the main."

The raiders were to sneak south in civilian clothing and rendezvous in Marietta, Georgia. All but two made it and boarded a train pulled by the locomotive General on April 12, 1862. The train traveled north and stopped in Big Shanty, Georgia for breakfast, and the raiders stole the General and a few cars, intending to tear up track and burn bridges behind them and meet advancing Federal troops. After a chase described in Great Locomotive Chase, the raiders ran out of fuel near Chattanooga, Tennessee, and were captured.

As a civilian, Campbell was tried and convicted of being an unlawful combatant. He was hanged with six others June 18, 1862 at the corner of Fair Street (now Memorial Drive) and South Park Avenue, Atlanta, Georgia. His hanging was described : "Five only remained dangling in the air; for two of the seven, Campbell and Slavens, being very heavy men, broke the ropes, and fell to the ground insensible. In a short time they recovered, and asked for a drink of water, which was given them. Then they requested an hour to pray before entering the future world, which lay so near and dark before them. This last petition was indignantly refused, and as soon as the ropes could be adjusted, they were compelled to re-ascend the scaffold, and were again turned off!" Campbell was buried nearby, and his remains were removed April 25, 1866 to Chattanooga National Cemetery, near the Ohio Memorial, (Section G, grave No. 11,180).

Secretary of War Edwin M. Stanton awarded the first Medals of Honor to several of the raiders. As a civilian, Campbell was not eligible.

Jeff York played Campbell in the Disney movie The Great Locomotive Chase.

== See also ==
- List of Andrews Raiders
