= Philip G. Shadrach =

Union Army Medal of Honor recipient (1840–1862)

Philip Gephart Shadrach
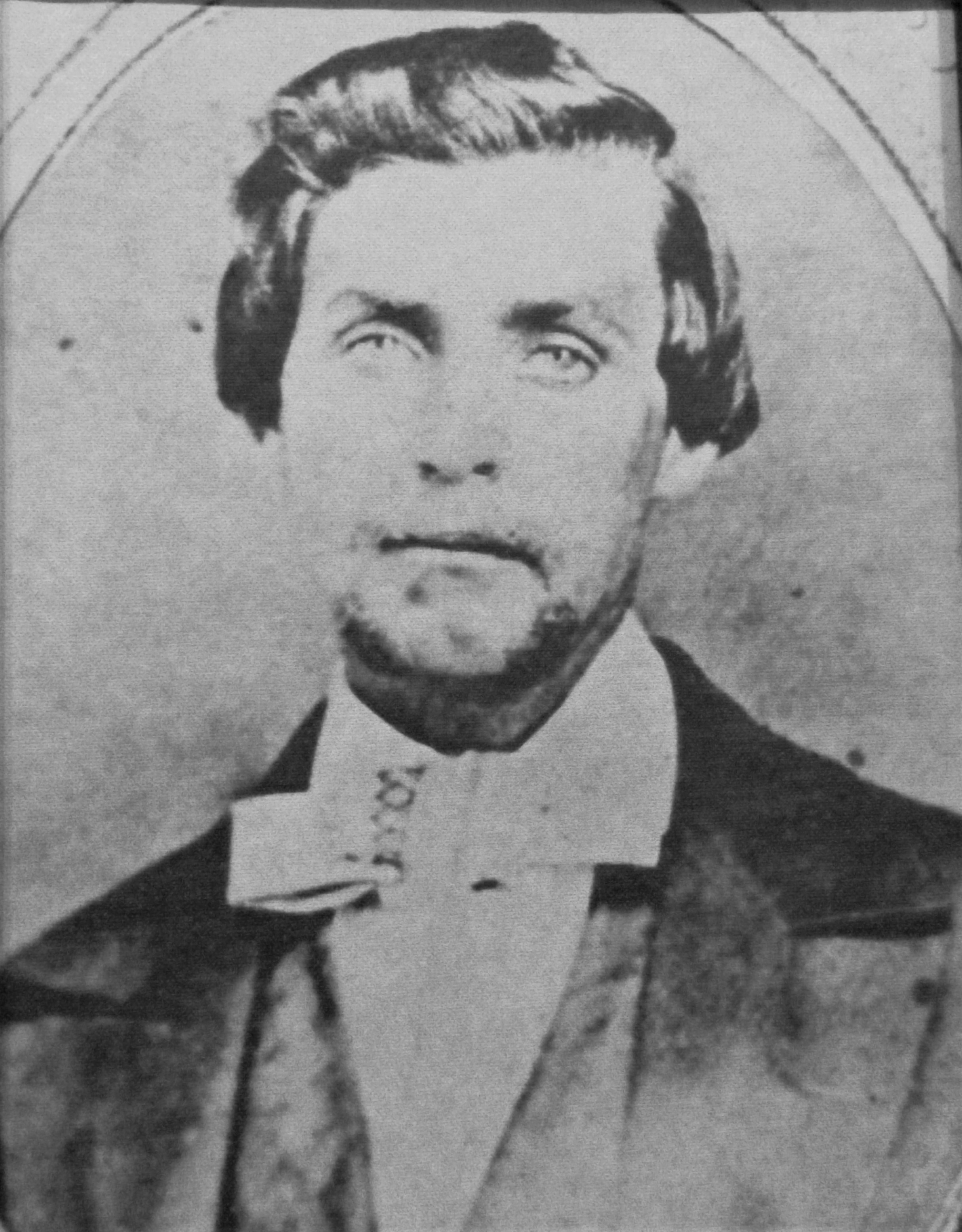
- 1860s portrait of Shadrach
- Born: September 15, 1840; Somerset County, Pennsylvania, U.S.
- Died: June 18, 1862 (aged 21); Atlanta, Georgia, U.S.
- Cause of death: Execution by hanging
- Military career
- Allegiance: United States
- Branch: United States Army
- Service years: 1861–1862
- Rank: Private
- Units: "K" Company, 2nd Ohio Infantry Regiment
- Conflicts: American Civil War (POW); Great Locomotive Chase (executed)
- Awards: Medal of Honor

Philip Gephart Shadrach (or Shadrack; September 15, 1840 – June 18, 1862) was an American soldier who was executed by the Confederates in 1862 for his participation in the Great Locomotive Chase. As a result of his involvement, he was posthumously awarded a Medal of Honor by President Joseph Biden on July 3, 2024.

== Early life ==
Shadrach was born in Somerset County, Pennsylvania, on September 15, 1840. He enlisted as a private with Company "K" of the 2nd Ohio Infantry Regiment for three years on September 20, 1861, at a place called the Mitchell Salt Works in Ohio. He enlisted as "Charles P. (Perry) Shadrach".

== Andrews Raid ==
On April 12, 1862, Shadrach participated in the Andrews Raid, otherwise known as the Great Locomotive Chase. The participants' goal was to sabotage railways to prevent Confederate soldiers stationed in Chattanooga, Tennessee, from receiving supplies.

Shadrach was hanged alongside Samuel Robertson, John Morehead Scott, Samuel Slavens, and George D. Wilson in Atlanta, Georgia, on June 18, 1862. However, unlike Robertson, Scott, and Slavens, Shadrach and George Wilson were not posthumously awarded a Medal of Honor for their roles in the raid. In 2008, President George W. Bush signed legislation to authorize himself to award the Medal of Honor to Shadrach and Wilson. He and Wilson were awarded the Medal of Honor on July 3, 2024, by President Joe Biden.

== Medal of Honor citation ==
"Private Philip G. Shadrach distinguished himself by acts of gallantry and intrepidity above and beyond the call of duty while serving with the 2nd Ohio Volunteer Infantry in Georgia on 12 April 1862. Private Shadrach was one of 22 Andrews' Raiders who, by direction of Major Ormsby M. Mitchell, penetrated nearly 200 miles south into enemy territory. Upon capturing a railroad train at Big Shanty in Georgia, the group set out to complete their mission of disrupting enemy supply lines by destroying bridges and tracks between Chattanooga and Atlanta. Private Shadrach's gallant actions in close contact with the enemy were in keeping with the highest traditions of military service and reflect great credit upon himself, the Army of the Ohio, and the United States Army."

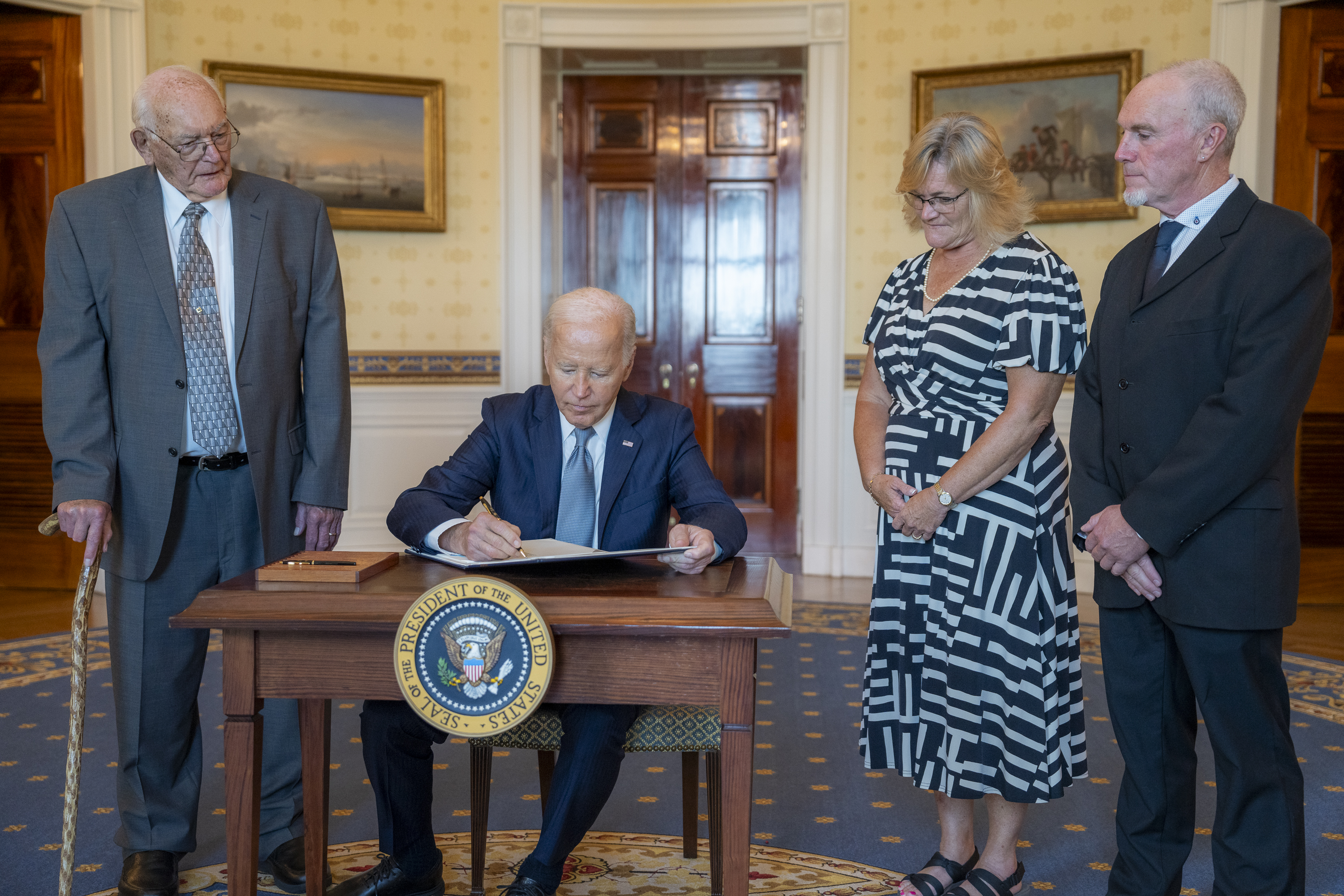
President Joe Biden signs a citation for Medal of Honor recipient Private Philip G. Shadrach (July 3, 2024)

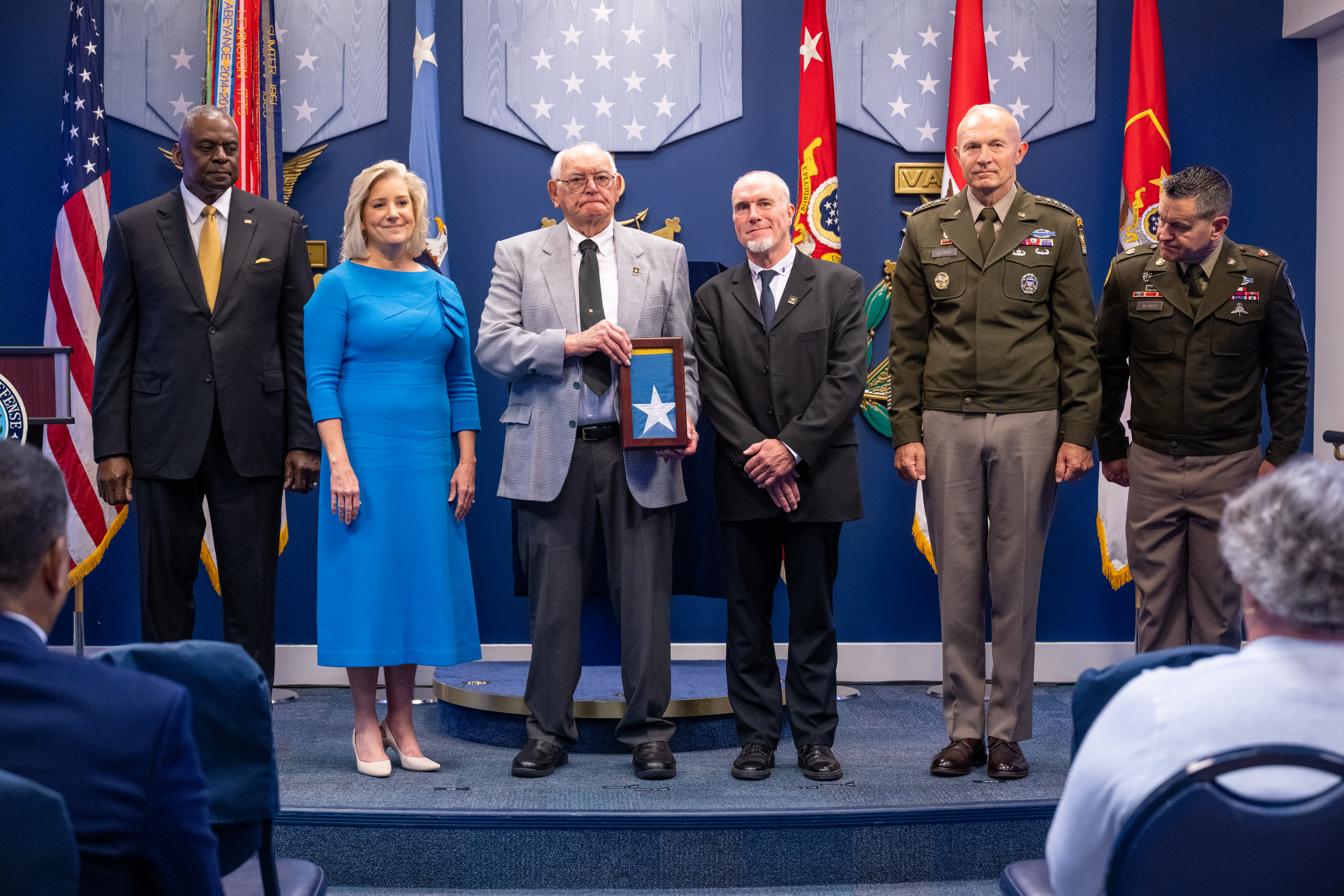
Lloyd Austin, Christine Wormuth, Randy A. George and Michael Weimer with Shadrach's family at the Pentagon Hall of Heroes Induction Ceremony (July 4, 2024)

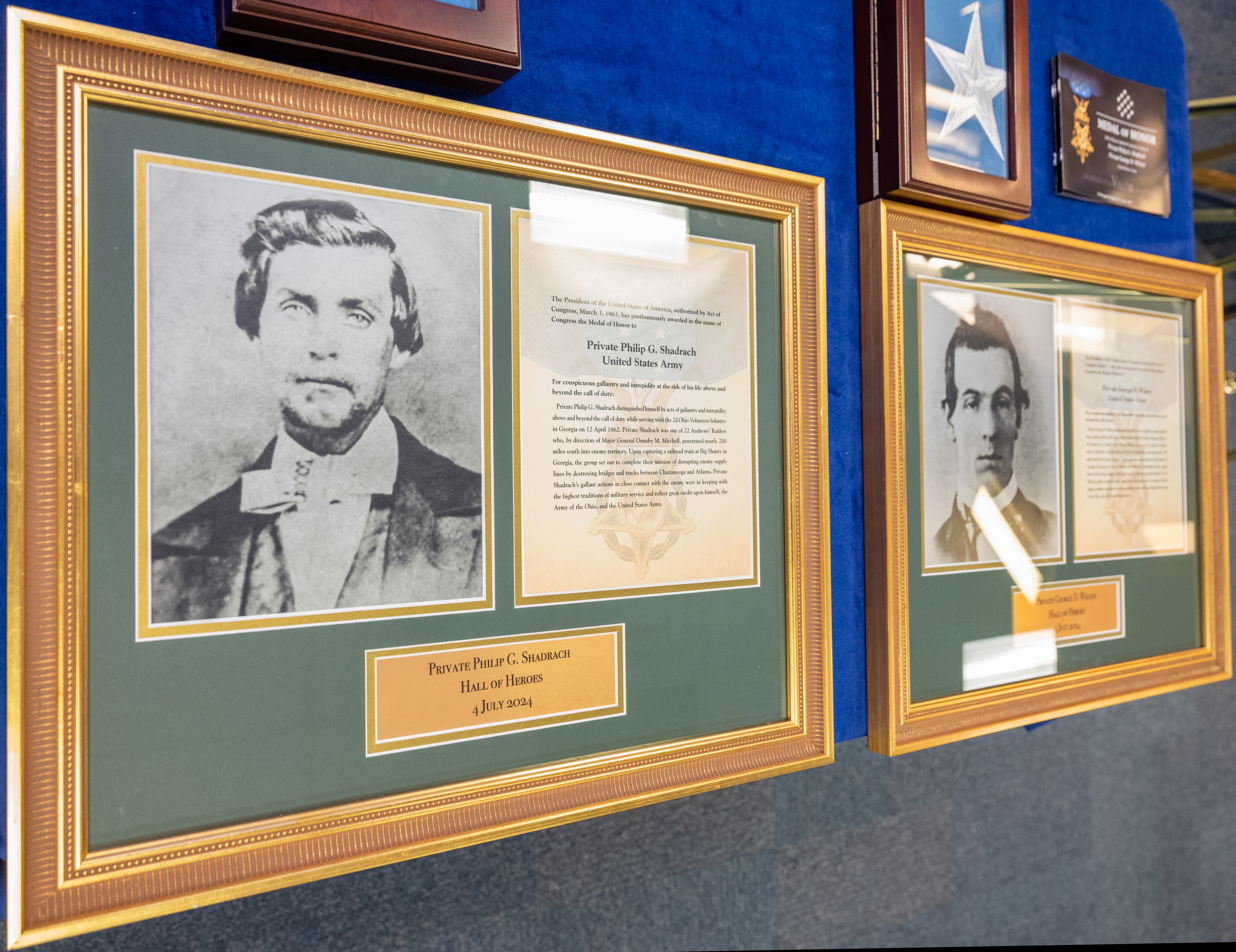
Panels displayed in the Pentagon Hall of Heroes

== See also ==
- List of Andrews Raiders
