= List of American Civil War Medal of Honor recipients =

The Medal of Honor was first awarded in the American Civil War (April 1861 – May 1865). President Abraham Lincoln signed a bill containing a provision for the medal for the Navy on December 21, 1861. It was "to be bestowed upon such petty officers, seamen, landsmen, and Marines as shall most distinguish themselves by their gallantry and other seamanlike qualities during the present war". Legislation to include the Army was signed into law on July 12, 1862.

While the Medal of Honor is now the highest military decoration attainable by a member of the United States armed forces, during the Civil War, it was the only one. Thus, it was often awarded for reasons that would not now satisfy the stringent modern criteria. For example, Secretary of War Edwin M. Stanton promised a Medal of Honor to every man in the 27th Maine Volunteer Infantry Regiment who extended his enlistment. 311 accepted, but because there was no official list of their names, the War Department issued 864 - one for each man in the unit. In 1916, a board consisting of five retired generals reviewed Army awards and recommended that these 864, as well as others, be revoked.

Of the 3,464 Medals of Honor awarded to date, 1,522 were awarded during the American Civil War. The first Medals of Honor were given to many of the participants of the Andrews' Raid, some posthumously. Andrews himself was a civilian and thus ineligible at the time. Mary Edwards Walker, a surgeon, became the only woman (and one of only eight civilians) awarded a Medal of Honor; it was later revoked, and then reinstated. At least thirty-two were awarded to African Americans, including sixteen sailors of the Union Navy, sixteen soldiers of the United States Colored Troops, and three soldiers of other Army units. It was common for Civil War Medals of Honor to be awarded decades after the conflict ended and in one case, Andrew Jackson Smith's Medal was not awarded until 2001, 137 years after the action in which he earned it. Smith's wait, caused by a missing battle report, was the longest delay of the award for any recipient, until November 6, 2014, when President Obama awarded the Medal of Honor to Union Army First Lieutenant Alonzo Cushing for his actions at the Battle of Gettysburg, taking the longest delay of the award to 151 years. This record was broken again on July 3, 2024, when President Biden awarded the Medal of Honor to Union Army soldiers Philip G. Shadrach and George D. Wilson, two of the Andrews Raiders of April 12, 1862.

== Recipients ==
- List of American Civil War Medal of Honor recipients: A–F
- List of American Civil War Medal of Honor recipients: G–L
- List of American Civil War Medal of Honor recipients: M–P
- List of American Civil War Medal of Honor recipients: Q–S
- List of American Civil War Medal of Honor recipients: T–Z

== See also ==
- List of Medal of Honor recipients
