= George D. Wilson =

American soldier and Medal of Honor recipient (1830–1862)

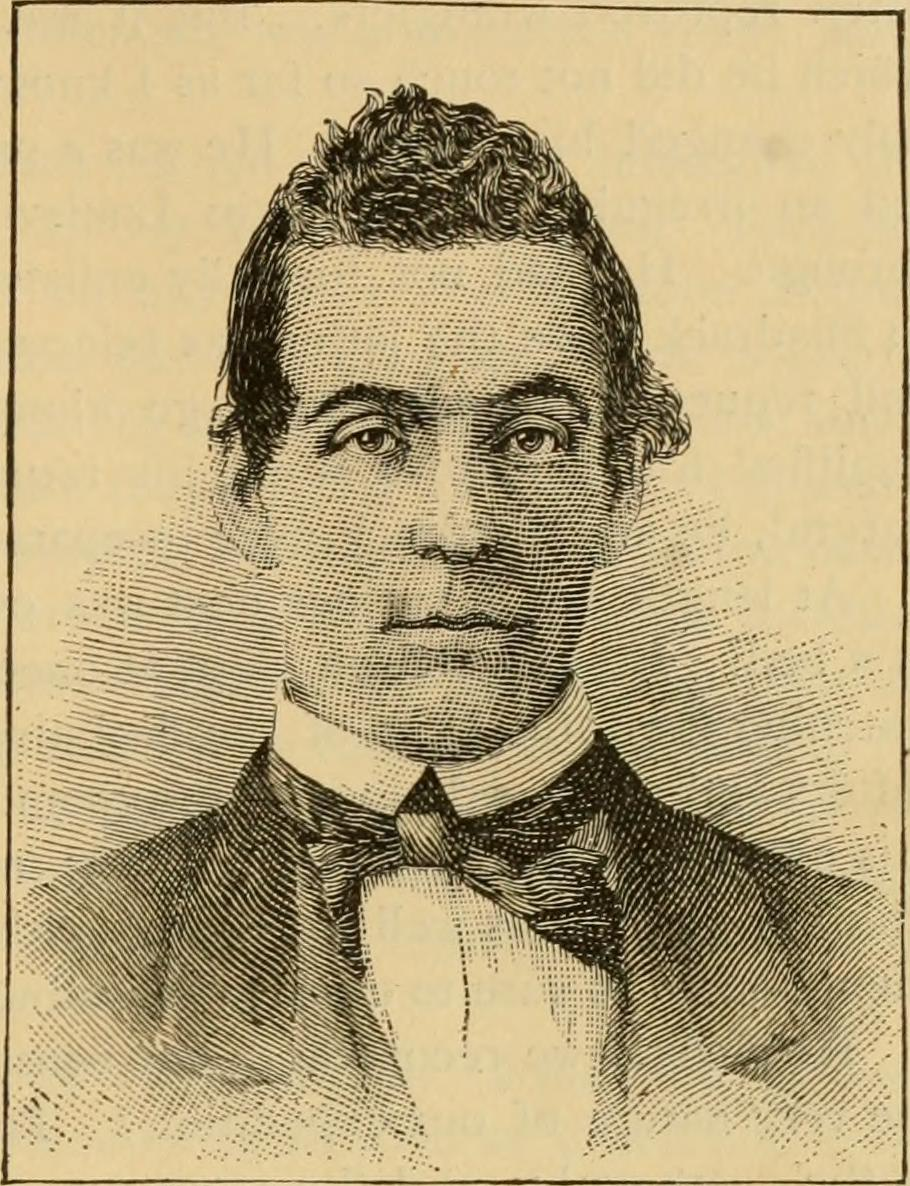
- 1887 portrait of Wilson
- Born: 1830; Belmont County, Ohio, US
- Died: June 18, 1862 (aged 31–32); Atlanta, Georgia, U.S.
- Cause of death: Execution by hanging
- Military career
- Allegiance: United States
- Branch: United States Army
- Rank: Private
- Unit: 2nd Ohio Infantry Regiment
- Conflicts: American Civil War (POW); Great Locomotive Chase (executed)
- Awards: Medal of Honor

George Davenport Wilson (1830 – June 18, 1862) was an American Civil War soldier and Medal of Honor recipient.

== Biography ==
Wilson was born in 1830, in Belmont County, Ohio, to George and Elizabeth Wilson. He worked as a journeyman shoemaker. On August 31, 1861, he enlisted in the 2nd Ohio Infantry Regiment. On April 12, 1862, he and 21 other men volunteered to travel 200 miles to destroy a Confederate railway. They were caught, and on May 31, he and six other men were tried and convicted as spies. They were executed by hanging on June 18, in Atlanta.

Wilson was initially buried at his execution site, but his remains were transferred to Chattanooga National Cemetery on April 25, 1866.

On July 4, 2024, Wilson and Philip G. Shadrach posthumously received the Medal of Honor from President Joe Biden.

== Medal of Honor citation ==
"Private George D. Wilson distinguished himself by acts of gallantry and intrepidity above and beyond the call of duty while serving with the 2nd Ohio Volunteer Infantry in Georgia on 12 April 1862. Private Wilson was one of 22 Andrews' Raiders who, by direction of Major Ormsby M. Mitchell, penetrated nearly 200 miles south into enemy territory. Upon capturing a railroad train at Big Shanty in Georgia, the group set out to complete their mission of disrupting enemy supply lines by destroying bridges and tracks between Chattanooga and Atlanta. Private Wilson's gallant actions in close contact with the enemy were in keeping with the highest traditions of military service and reflect great credit upon himself, the Army of the Ohio, and the United States Army."

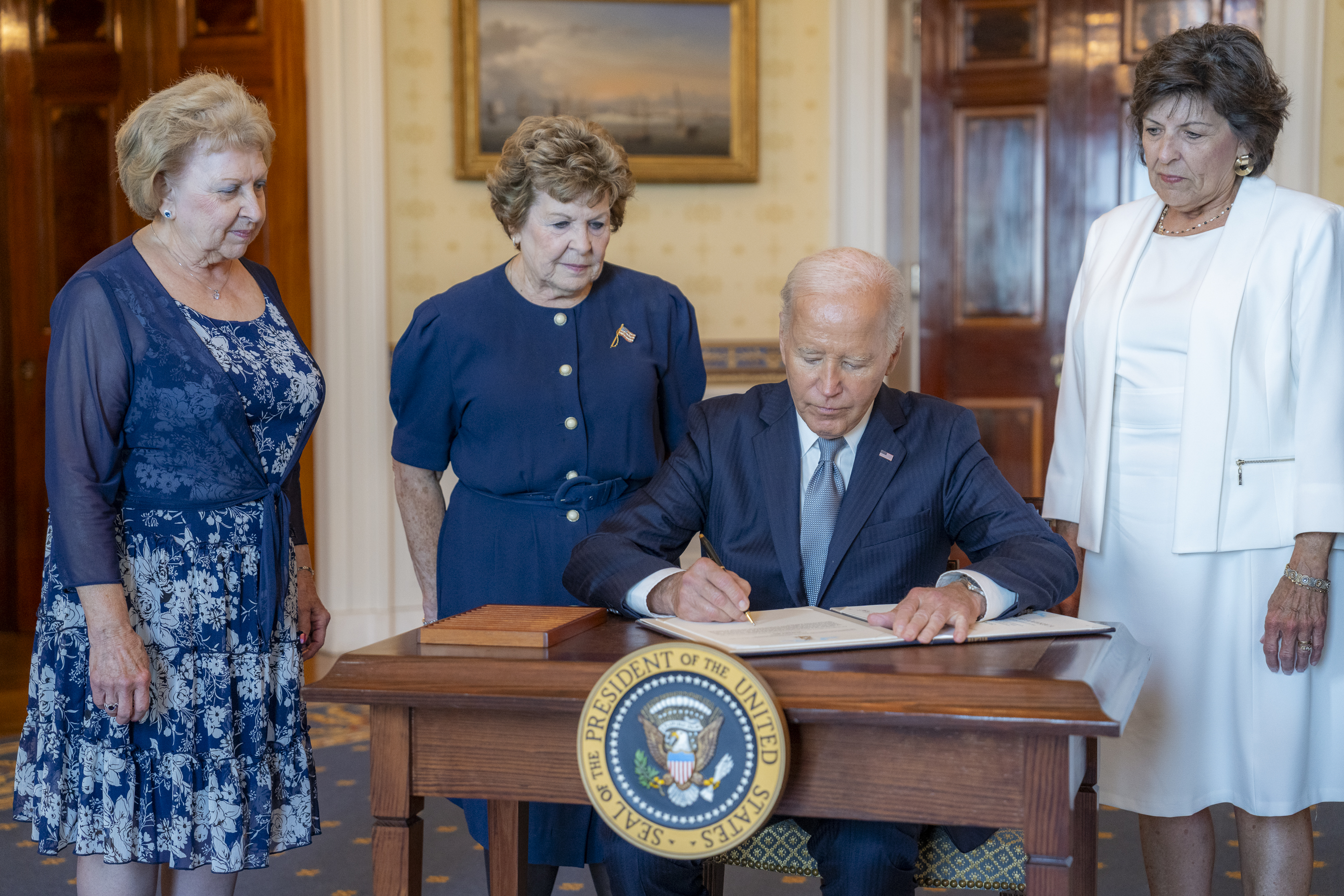
President Joe Biden signs a citation for Medal of Honor recipient Private George D. Wilson (July 3, 2024)

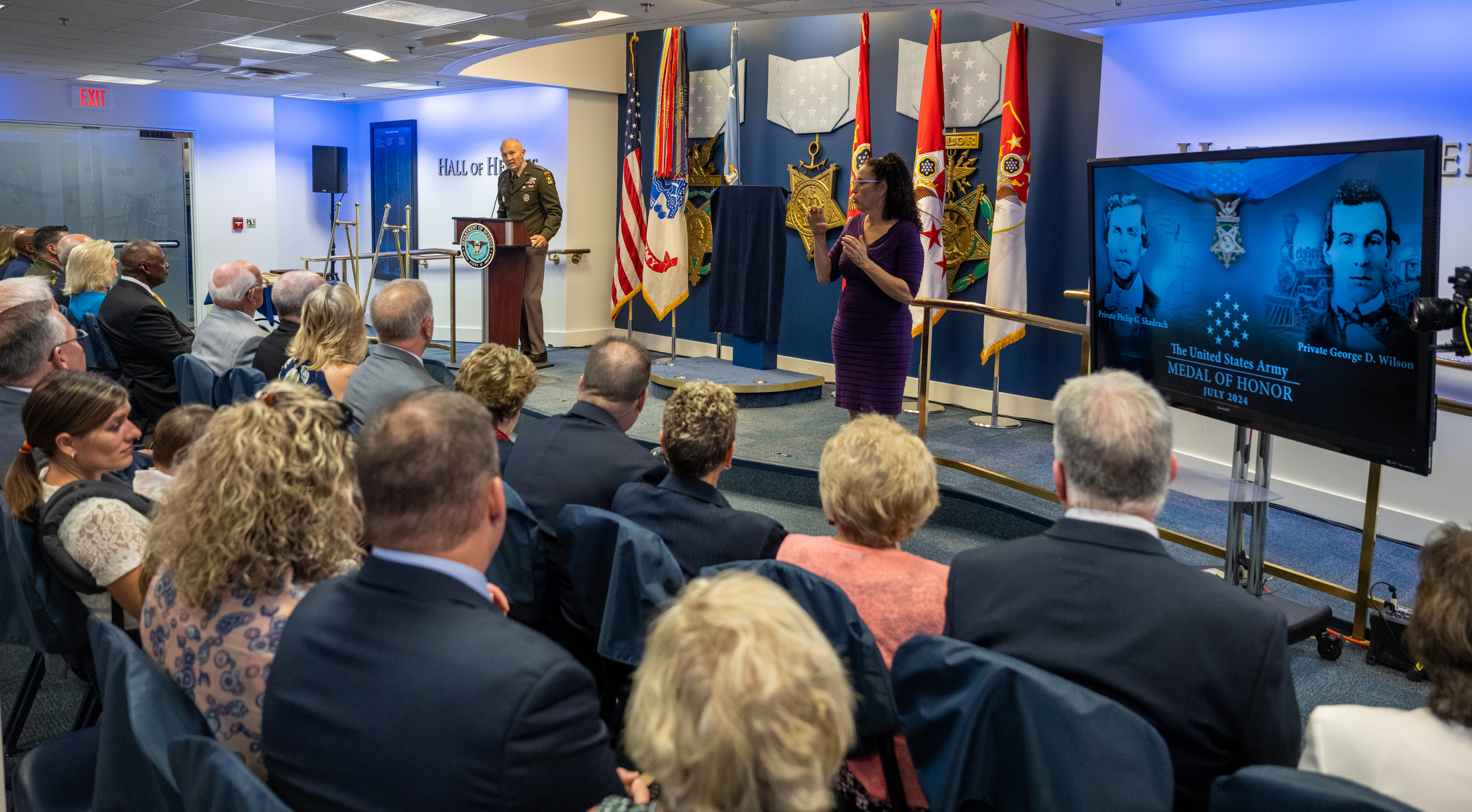
Randy A. George speaks at the Pentagon Hall of Heroes Induction Ceremony for Wilson and Philip G. Shadrach (July 4, 2024)

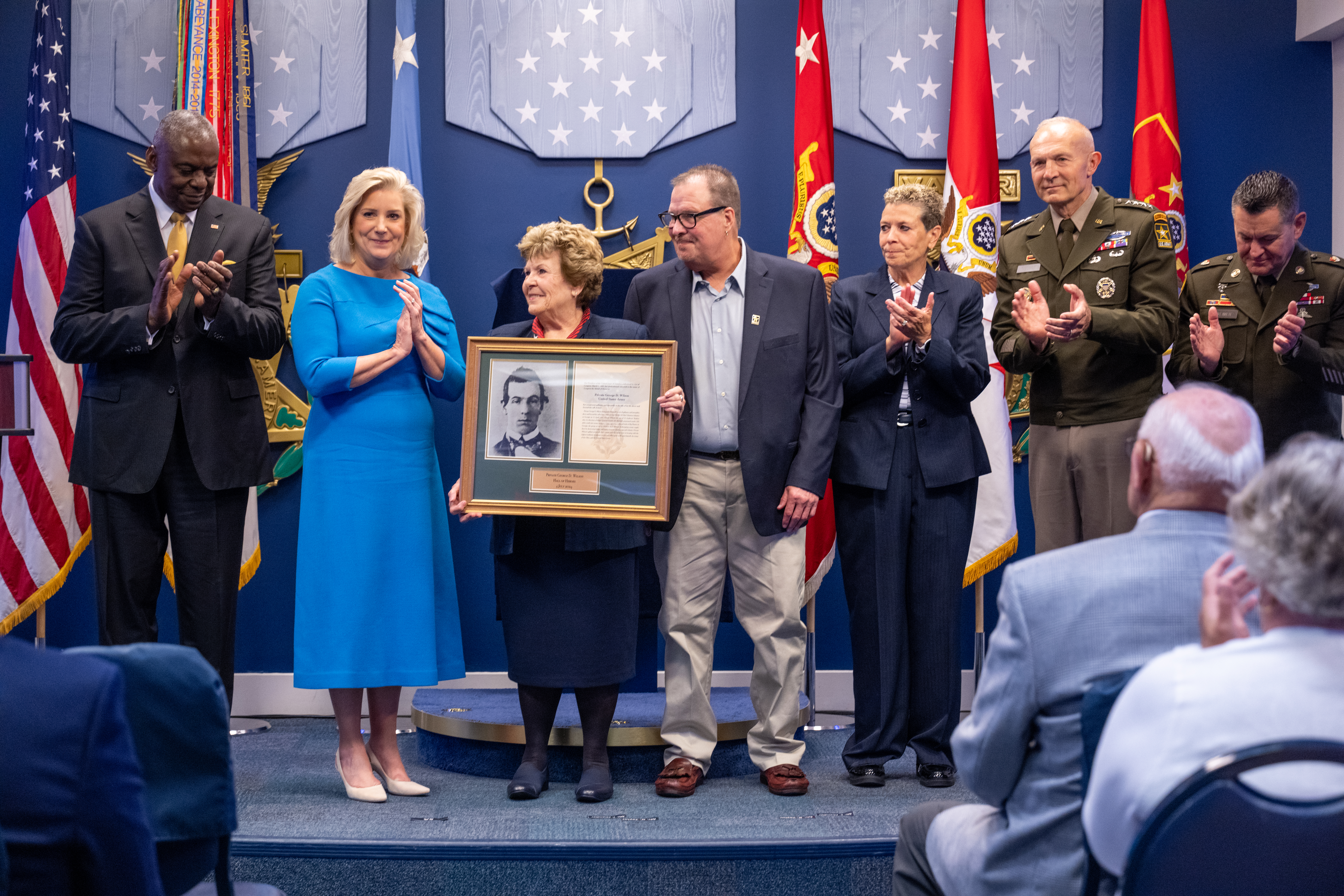
Lloyd Austin, Christine Wormuth, Randy A. George and Michael Weimer with Wilson's family at the Pentagon Hall of Heroes Induction Ceremony (July 4, 2024)

== See also ==
- List of Andrews Raiders
