= Ray E. Duke =

United States Army Medal of Honor recipient

- Medal of Honor recipient
- Born: May 9, 1923; Whitwell, Tennessee
- Died: November 11, 1951 (aged 28); Korea
- Burial place: Chattanooga National Cemetery
- Military career
- Allegiance: United States of America
- Branch: United States Army
- Service years: 1951
- Rank: Master Sergeant (posthumous)
- Units: Company C, 24th Infantry Regiment, 25th Infantry Division
- Conflicts: Korean War (WIA) (POW) (DOW)
- Awards: Medal of Honor; Purple Heart (2)

Ray Eugene Duke (May 9, 1923 – November 11, 1951) was a soldier in the United States Army during the Korean War. He posthumously received the Medal of Honor for his actions on April 26, 1951. He was captured by the enemy, and died as a prisoner of war later that year.

== Medal of Honor citation ==
Sfc. Duke, a member of Company C, distinguished himself by conspicuous gallantry and outstanding courage above and beyond the call of duty in action against the enemy. Upon learning that several of his men were isolated and heavily engaged in an area yielded by his platoon when ordered to withdraw, he led a small force in a daring assault which recovered the position and the beleaguered men. Another enemy attack in strength resulted in numerous casualties but Sfc. Duke, although wounded by mortar fragments, calmly moved along his platoon line to coordinate fields of fire and to urge his men to hold firm in the bitter encounter. Wounded a second time he received first aid and returned to his position. When the enemy again attacked shortly after dawn, despite his wounds, Sfc. Duke repeatedly braved withering fire to insure maximum defense of each position. Threatened with annihilation and with mounting casualties, the platoon was again ordered to withdraw when Sfc. Duke was wounded a third time in both legs and was unable to walk. Realizing that he was impeding the progress of 2 comrades who were carrying him from the hill, he urged them to leave him and seek safety. He was last seen pouring devastating fire into the ranks of the onrushing assailants. The consummate courage, superb leadership, and heroic actions of Sfc. Duke, displayed during intensive action against overwhelming odds, reflect the highest credit upon himself, the infantry, and the U.S. Army.

== Awards and decorations ==

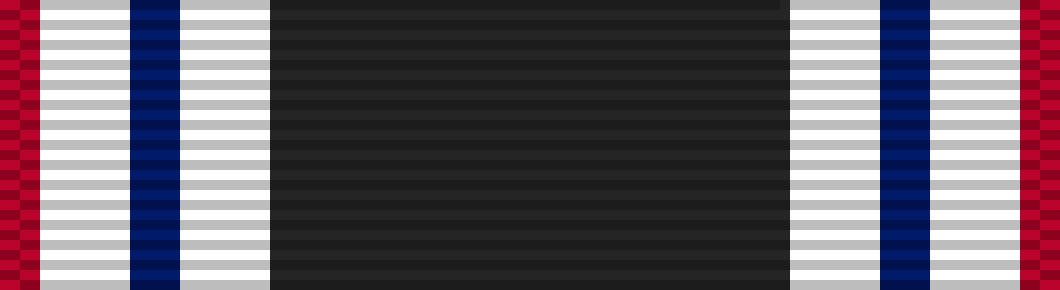

Badge	Combat Infantryman Badge		
1st row	Medal of Honor		Bronze Star Medal
2nd row	Purple Heart with 1 Oak leaf cluster	Prisoner of War Medal	Army Good Conduct Medal
3rd row	American Campaign Medal	World War II Victory Medal	National Defense Service Medal
4th row	Korean Service Medal with 1 Campaign star	United Nations Service Medal Korea	Korean War Service Medal
Unit awards	Korean Presidential Unit Citation		

== See also ==
- List of Medal of Honor recipients
- List of Korean War Medal of Honor recipients
