= William Zion =

United States Marine Corps Medal of Honor recipient

William F. Zion
- Born: October 23, 1872; Knightstown, Indiana
- Died: March 25, 1919 (aged 46); Fort Oglethorpe, Georgia
- Burial place: Chattanooga National Cemetery
- Military career
- Allegiance: United States of America
- Branch: United States Marine Corps; United States Army
- Service years: 1899–1904 (Marine Corps); 1905–1919 (Army)
- Rank: Private (Marine Corps); First Lieutenant (Army)
- Conflicts: China Relief Expedition; Battle of Peking; World War I
- Awards: Medal of Honor

William F. Zion (October 23, 1872 – March 25, 1919) was a United States Marine private who received the Medal of Honor during the China Relief Expedition.

== Biography ==
William Zion was born in Knightstown, Indiana, on October 23, 1872. He served in the United States Marine Corps and later in the United States Army. In 1900, he was awarded the Medal of Honor for his "meritorious conduct" as a Marine in China.

He later become a United States Army First Lieutenant.

During World War I he was in charge of a German POW barracks in Fort Oglethorpe.

Zion died on March 25, 1919, of an apparent accidental gunshot wound inflicted while cleaning his weapon. Lieutenant Zion is buried in the Chattanooga National Cemetery.

According to Sydney Gumpertz in his book The Jewish Legion of Valor, Zion was Jewish.

== Medal of Honor citation ==
Rank and Organization: Private, U.S. Marine Corps. Born: October 23, 1872, Knightstown, Ind. Accredited to: California. G. O. No.: 55 July 19, 1901.

Citation:

In the presence of the enemy during the battle of Peking, China, July 21 to August 17, 1900. Throughout this period, Zion distinguished himself by meritorious conduct.

== See also ==
- List of Medal of Honor recipients
