= Martin J. Hawkins =

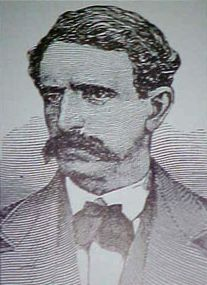
- Born: 1830; Mercer County, Pennsylvania
- Died: 1886 (aged 55–56)
- Burial place: Quincy, Illinois
- Military career
- Allegiance: United States of America
- Branch: United States Army
- Rank: First Lieutenant
- Units: Company A, 33rd Ohio Infantry
- Conflicts: American Civil War; Great Locomotive Chase
- Awards: Medal of Honor

Martin Jones Hawkins (1830 – February 7, 1886) was a Union Army officer in the American Civil War who received the U.S. military's highest decoration, the Medal of Honor.

Hawkins was born in Mercer County, Pennsylvania in 1840 and entered service at Portsmouth, Scioto County, Ohio. He was awarded the Medal of Honor, for extraordinary heroism shown in April 1862 during the Great Locomotive Chase, at Big Shanty, Georgia while serving as a corporal with Company A, 33rd Ohio Infantry. His Medal of Honor was issued in September 1863.

Hawkins died at the age of 55, on February 7, 1886, and was buried at Woodland Cemetery in Quincy, Illinois.

== Medal of Honor citation ==
The President of the United States of America, in the name of Congress, takes pleasure in presenting the Medal of Honor to Corporal Martin Jones Hawkins, United States Army, for extraordinary heroism on April, 1862, while serving with Company G, 21st Ohio Infantry, in action during the Andrew's Raid in Georgia. Corporal Hawkins was one of the 19 of 22 men (including two civilians) who, by direction of General Mitchell (or Buell), penetrated nearly 200 miles south into enemy territory and captured a railroad train at Big Shanty, Georgia, in an attempt to destroy the bridges and track between Chattanooga and Atlanta.

== See also ==
- Great Locomotive Chase
- 33rd Ohio Infantry
- Big Shanty, Georgia
- List of Andrews Raiders
