= William H. Surles =

US Medal of Honor recipient

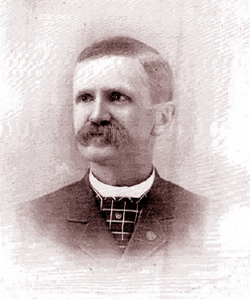
- Born: 24 February 1845; Steubenville, Ohio
- Died: 19 March 1919 (aged 74); East Liverpool, Ohio
- Burial place: Riverview Cemetery, East Liverpool, Ohio
- Military career
- Allegiance: United States (Union)
- Branch: Army
- Service years: 1861-1864
- Rank: Private
- Units: Company G, 2nd Ohio Infantry
- Conflicts: Perryville, Kentucky

William H. Surles (24 February 1845 - 19 March 1919) was a private in the United States Army who was awarded the Medal of Honor for gallantry during the American Civil War. Surles was awarded the medal on 19 August 1891 for actions performed at the Battle of Perryville in Kentucky on 8 October 1862.

== Personal life ==
Surles was born in Steubenville, Ohio on 24 February 1845, the son of John and Emily Surles and one of two children. He married Sara J. Allen and fathered one child. After the war, he worked as a coal dealer and a postmaster (13 years) in East Liverpool, Ohio and served as department commander of the Ohio G.A.R. in 1916. He died in East Liverpool on 19 March 1919 and was buried in Riverview Cemetery in East Liverpool.

== Military service ==
Surles enlisted in the Army on 5 September 1861 at Steubenville, Ohio and was assigned to Company G of the 2nd Ohio Infantry. On 8 October 1862, at the Battle of Perryville, Surles' regiment was overwhelmed by a large Confederate force. In the chaos, Surles noticed a Confederate soldier taking aim through a musket at Colonel Anson G. McCook, the commander of the 2nd, who had just had his horse shot out from under him. Surles jumped in front of the colonel, intending to take the bullet, but the Confederate soldier was killed before he could fire and Surles and the colonel escaped uninjured.

Surles' Medal of Honor citation, describing this action, reads:

The President of the United States of America, in the name of Congress, takes pleasure in presenting the Medal of Honor to Private William H. Surles, United States Army, for extraordinary heroism on 8 October 1862, while serving with Company G, 2d Ohio Infantry, in action at Perryville, Kentucky, In the hottest part of the fire Private Surles stepped in front of his colonel to shield him from the enemy's fire.

— Redfield Proctor, Secretary of War

Surles was mustered out of the Army on 10 October 1864.
