= Chattanooga National Cemetery =

Historic veterans cemetery in Tennessee, US

- U.S. National Register of Historic Places
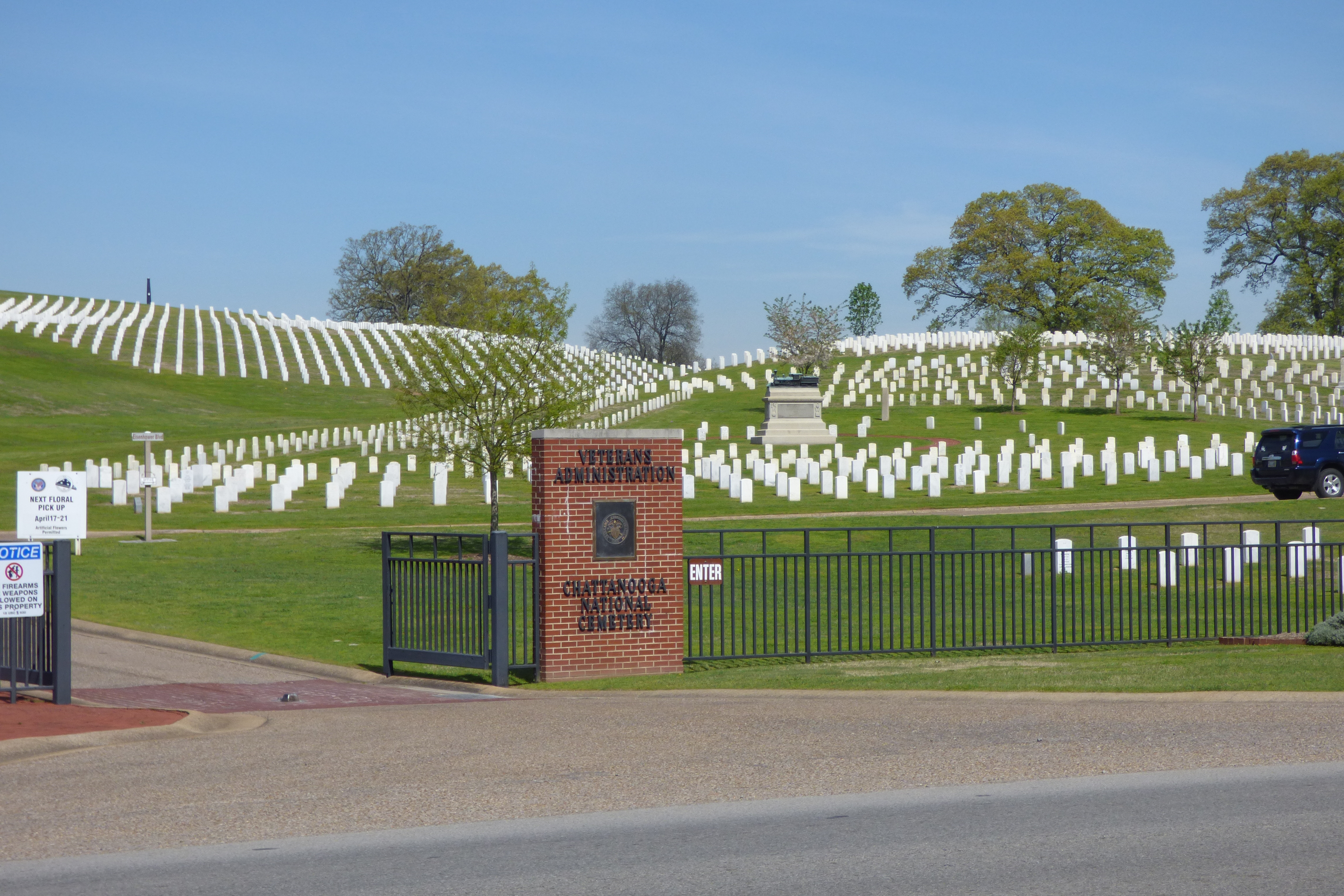
- Location: 1200 Bailey Ave. Chattanooga, Tennessee
- Coordinates: 35°02′06″N 85°17′22″W
- Built: December 25, 1863
- Website: Chattanooga National Cemetery
- MPS: Civil War Era National Cemeteries MPS
- NRHP reference No.: 96001013
- Added to NRHP: September 16, 1996

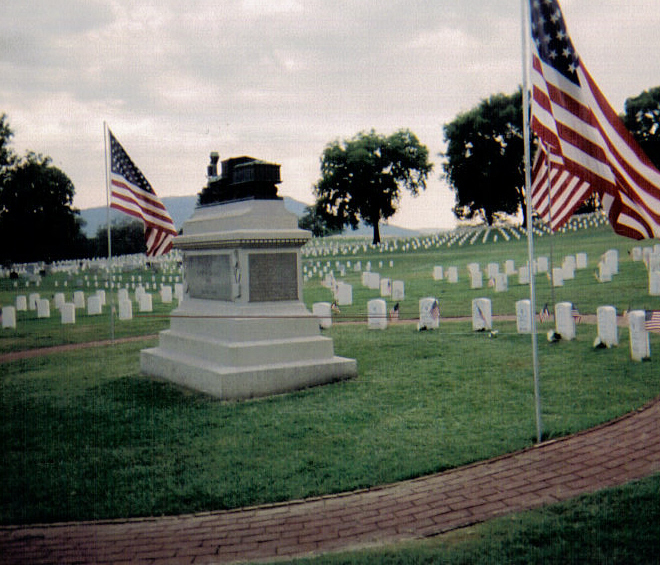
Monument and graves of the Civil War Medal of Honor recipients who took part in the Great Locomotive Chase

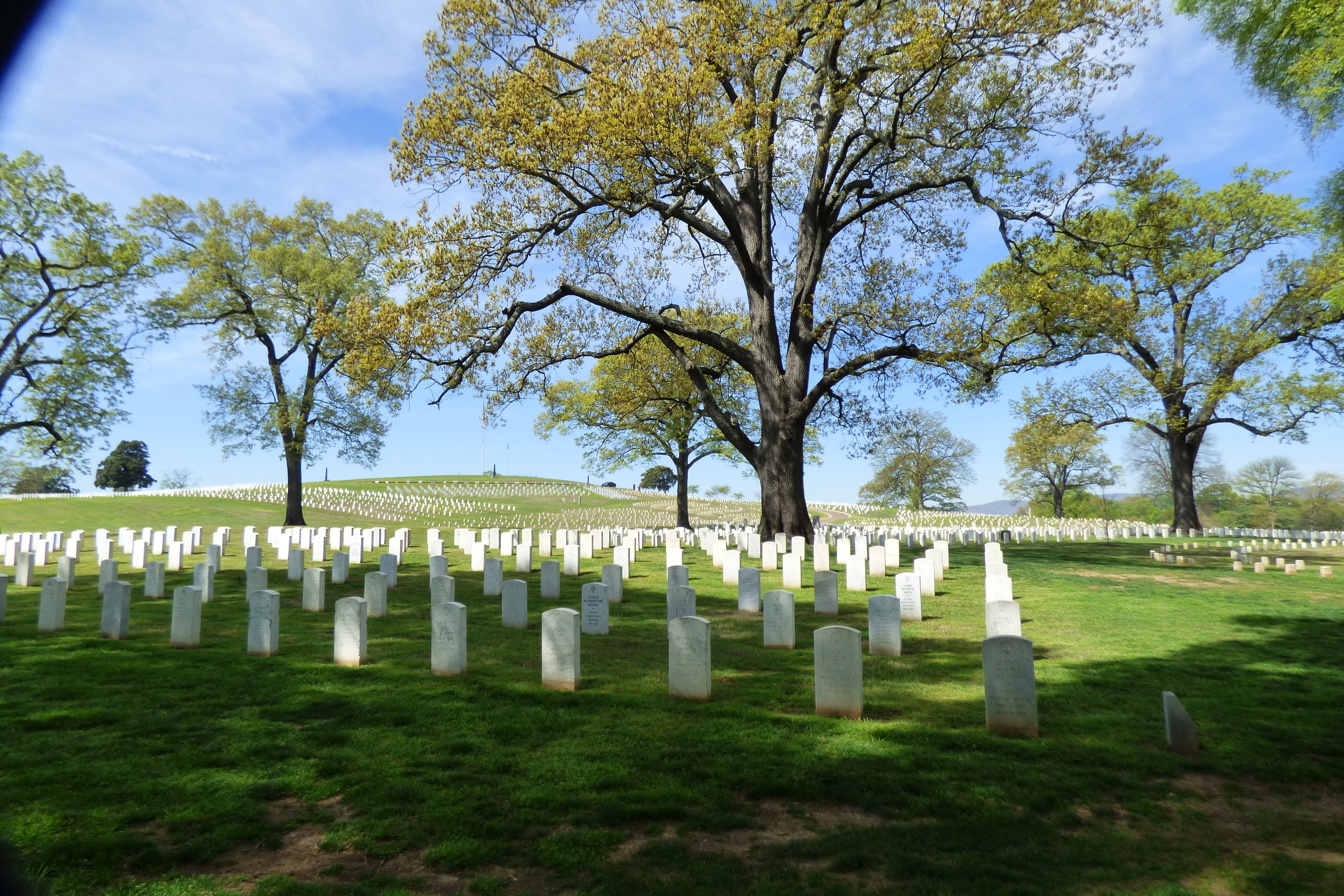
Graves stretching to the top of the hill in the center of the cemetery

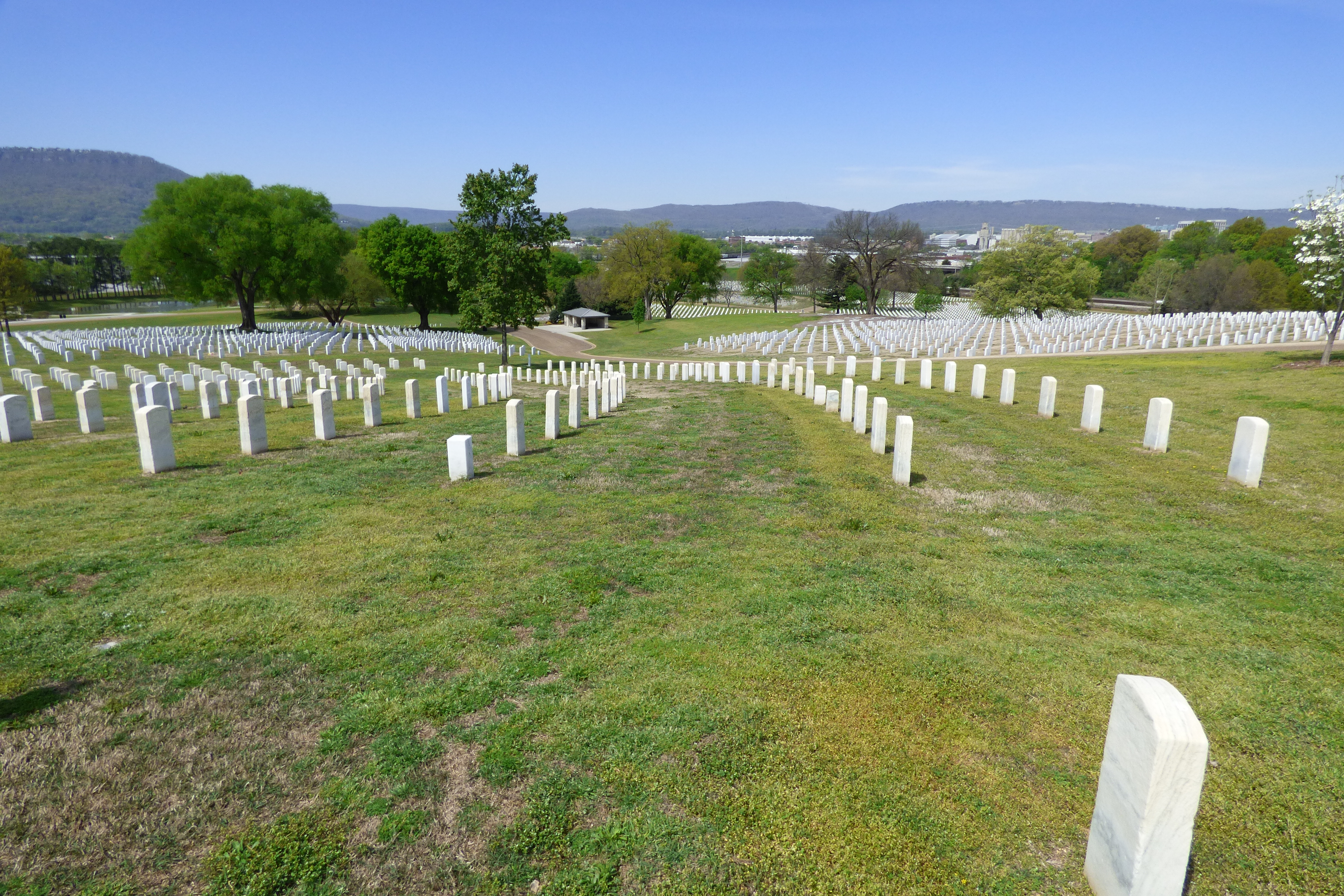
View across the cemetery to Lookout Mountain, the site of one of the battles in 1862

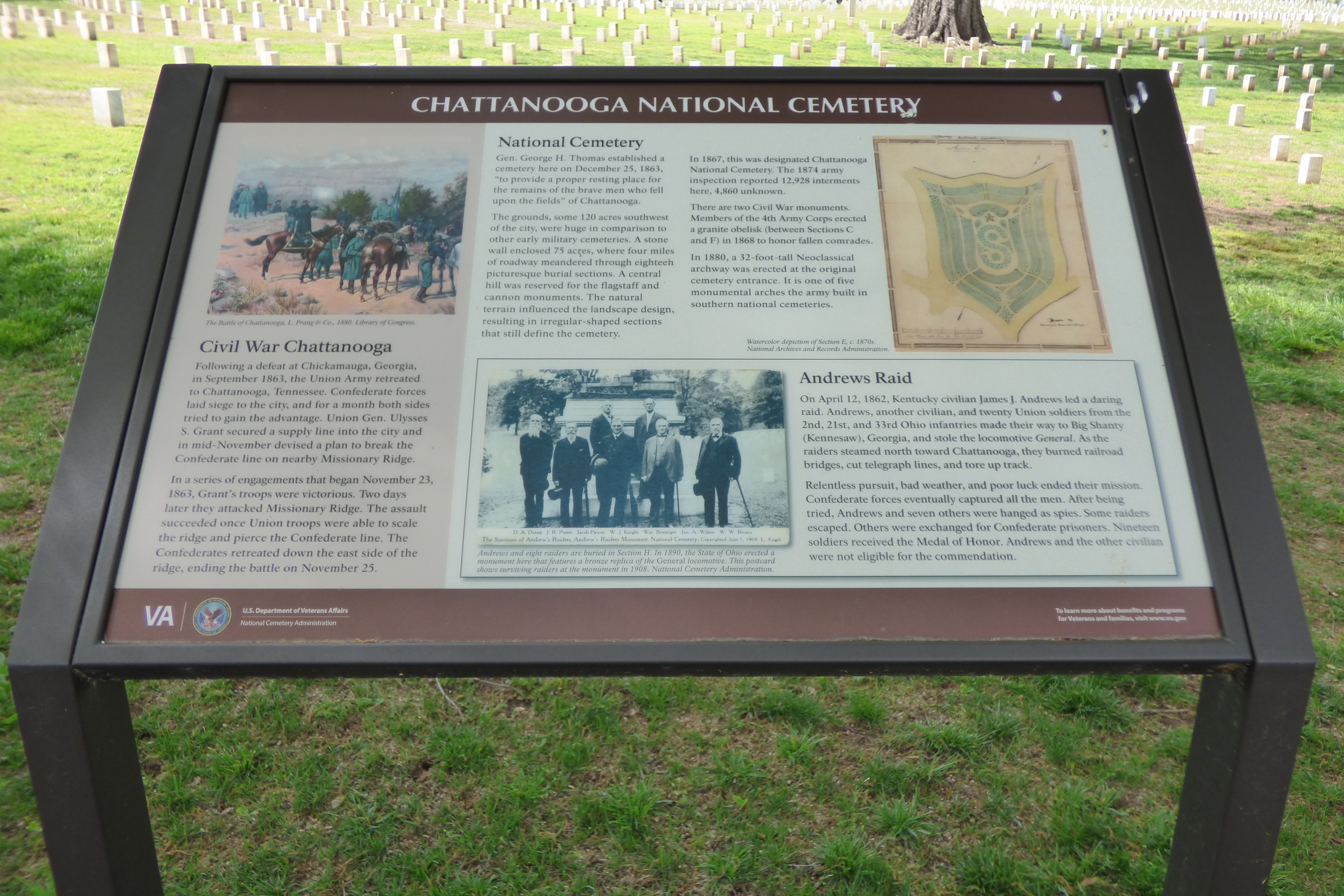
Plaque about the Chattanooga National Cemetery

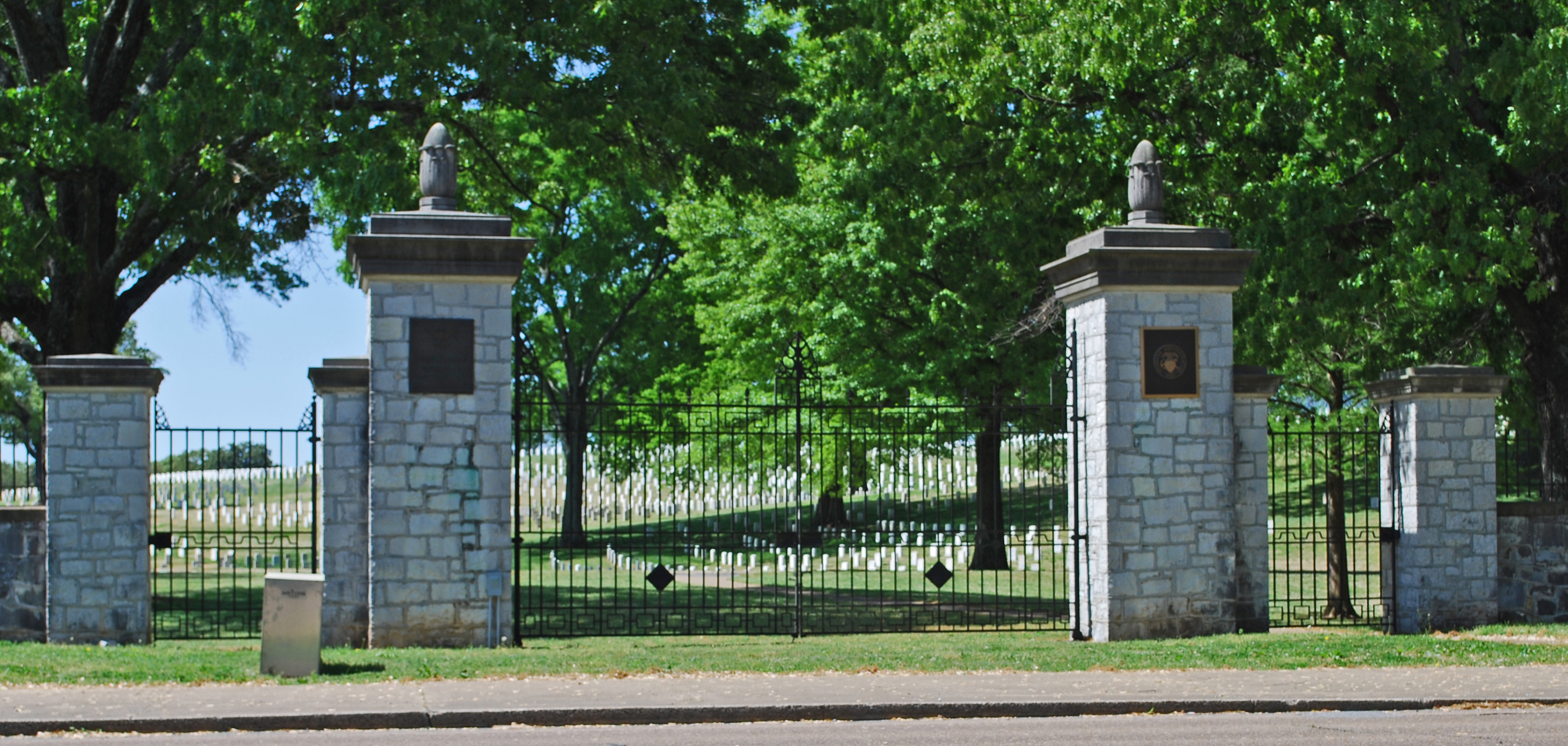
Gate on Bailey Ave

Chattanooga National Cemetery is a United States National Cemetery located near the center of the city of Chattanooga in Hamilton County, Tennessee. Administered by the United States Department of Veterans Affairs, it encompasses 120.9 acres (48.9 ha), and as of 2014, had more than 50,000 interments.

== History ==
The cemetery was established in 1863, by an order from Major General George Henry Thomas after the Civil War Battles of Chattanooga, as a place to inter Union soldiers who fell in combat. 75 acres (30 ha) of land was initially appropriated from two local land owners, but later purchased. It became Chattanooga National Cemetery in 1867. By 1870 more than 12,000 interments had been made, most of whom were unknown. Many nearby battlefield burials were also reinterred in Chattanooga, including nearly 1,500 burials from the Battle of Chickamauga. Franklin Guest Smith, who served as secretary and member of the Chickamauga and Chattanooga National Military Park Commission from 1893 until 1908, played an important role in preserving and expanding the cemetery, and a monument at the cemetery was dedicated in his honor.

During World War I (78) and World War II (108) German prisoners of war who died while in captivity were buried in Chattanooga National Cemetery. After the war, the German government paid to have other POWs disinterred from Hot Springs National Cemetery and moved to Chattanooga.

Chattanooga National Cemetery was listed in the National Register of Historic Places in 1996.

Originally the site was expected to close for new burials in 2015. However, due to a recent expansion project that will add the capacity for more than 5,000 interments, the cemetery is now expected to be available for burials until 2045.

== Notable monuments ==
- A 40-foot high memorial archway, constructed in 1868.
- The Andrews Raiders Memorial, erected in 1890. It includes a bronze replica of the locomotive known as The General, stolen by Union partisan James J. Andrews and his men in the Great Locomotive Chase.
- German World War I prisoner of war monument, erected by the German government in 1935.

== Notable interments ==
- The Andrews Raiders
  - Medal of Honor recipients
    - Private Samuel Robertson
    - Sergeant Major Marion A. Ross
    - Sergeant John M. Scott
    - Private Samuel Slavens'
  - Other Raiders
    - James J. Andrews, leader of the raid (civilian)
    - William H. Campbell, civilian member
    - Private Philip G. Shadrack
    - Private George D. Wilson
- Medal of Honor recipients
  - Master Sergeant Ray E. Duke, for action in the Korean War. Also, recipient of Republic of Korea's version of the Medal of Honor (the Merit Taegug Medal)
  - Corporal Desmond Doss, for action in World War II, the first conscientious objector to be awarded the Medal of Honor.
  - Private William F. Zion, USMC, for action in the Boxer Rebellion
  - Technical Sergeant Charles Coolidge, US Army, last person to receive the award during World War II
- Other notables
  - Cal Ermer, Major League Baseball player and Marine Corps veteran.
  - William P. Sanders, Civil War Union Army officer.
  - Timothy R. Stanley, Brigadier General during the Civil War.
  - Sammy Strang, Major League Baseball player and United States Military Academy coach.
- Other noteworthy interments
  - 186 foreign prisoners of war from World War I and World War II including:
    - Karl Bulowius, German army general.
  - One Canadian soldier of World War I.

== See also ==
- List of cemeteries in Tennessee
