= Samuel Robertson (Medal of Honor) =

American Medal of Honor recipient

Private Samuel Robertson
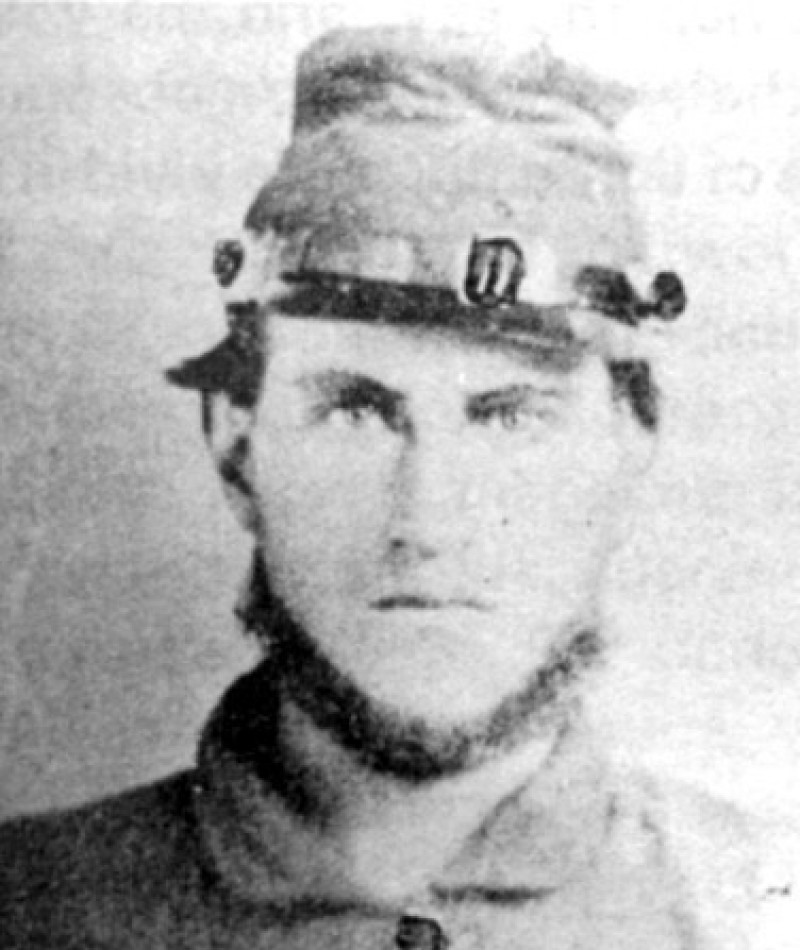
- Born: May 1, 1843; Muskingum County, Ohio, U.S.
- Died: June 18, 1862 (aged 19); Atlanta, Georgia, U.S.
- Military career
- Allegiance: United States
- Branch: Union Army
- Service years: 1861–1862
- Rank: Private
- Units: Company G, 33rd Ohio Infantry
- Conflicts: American Civil War: Mitchel Raid
- Awards: Medal of Honor

Samuel Robertson (May 1, 1843 – June 18, 1862) was a private in the United States Army who was awarded the Medal of Honor for gallantry during the American Civil War. Robertson was the first American soldier posthumously awarded the Medal of Honor; he was awarded the medal in September 1863 for actions performed behind Confederate lines near Big Shanty, Georgia, in April 1862.

== Personal life ==
Robertson was born in Muskingum County, Ohio, on May 1, 1843.

== Military service ==
Robertson enlisted in the Army on September 1, 1861 at Bourneville, Ohio and was mustered into the 33rd Ohio Infantry. On April 12, 1862, a group of 22 men including Robertson from the 2nd, 21st, and 33rd Ohio Infantry, who had penetrated more than 200 miles into Confederate territory, successfully raided a train in Big Shanty, Georgia. This action was later known interchangeably as the Mitchel Raid (after General Ormsby M. Mitchell), the Andrews' Raid, and the Great Locomotive Chase.

Robertson was eventually captured and sentenced to death by hanging, and was executed for espionage on June 18, 1862.

Robertson's Medal of Honor citation reads:

The President of the United States of America, in the name of Congress, takes pride in presenting the Medal of Honor (Posthumously) to Private Samuel Robertson, United States Army, for extraordinary heroism on April, 1862, while serving with Company G, 21st Ohio Infantry, in action during the Andrew's Raid [sic] in Georgia. Private Robertson was one of the 19 of 22 men (including two civilians) who by direction of General Mitchell (or Buell) penetrated nearly 200 miles south into enemy territory and captured a railroad train at Big Shanty, Georgia, in an attempt to destroy the bridges and tracks between Chattanooga and Atlanta.

— E. M. Stanton, Secretary of War

Robertson's medal is attributed to Ohio.
