= 33rd Ohio Infantry Regiment =

Unit of the Union Army

- Active: August 5, 1861 – July 12, 1865
- Country: United States
- Allegiance: Union
- Branch: Union Army
- Type: Infantry
- Engagements: Battle of Perryville; Battle of Stones River; Tullahoma Campaign; Battle of Chickamauga; Siege of Chattanooga; Battle of Lookout Mountain; Battle of Missionary Ridge; Atlanta campaign; Battle of Resaca; Battle of Kennesaw Mountain; Battle of Peachtree Creek; Siege of Atlanta; Battle of Jonesboro; Sherman's March to the Sea; Carolinas campaign; Battle of Bentonville

Insignia
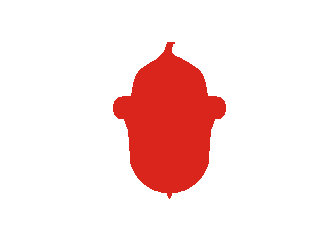
- 1st Brigade, 1st Division XIV Corps, Army of the Cumberland/Army of the Ohio

The 33rd Ohio Infantry Regiment was an infantry regiment in the Union Army during the American Civil War.

== Service ==
The 33rd Ohio Infantry Regiment was organized at Portsmouth, Ohio, from August 5 through September 13, 1861. It was mustered in for three years service under the command of Colonel Joshua Woodrow Sill. Companies were recruited from Southern Ohio.

The regiment was attached to 9th Brigade, Army of the Ohio, October to December 1861. 9th Brigade, 3rd Division, Army of the Ohio, to September 1862. 9th Brigade, 3rd Division, I Corps, Army of the Ohio, to November 1862. 1st Brigade, 1st Division, Center, XIV Corps, Army of the Cumberland, to January 1863. 1st Brigade, 1st Division, XIV Corps, to July 1865.

The 33rd Ohio Infantry mustered out of service at Louisville, Kentucky, on July 12, 1865.

=== Detailed service ===
The regiment's detailed service is as follows:

==== 1861 ====
- Left Ohio for Kentucky September 13 and joined Gen. Nelson at Maysville, Ky.
- Capture of Hazel Green, Ky., October 23, 1861.
- Operations against Williams' Invasion of the Bluegrass Region, Ky., November–December.
- Action at Ivy Mountain November 8.
- Piketon, Ky., November 8–9.
- Duty at Bacon Creek until February 1862.

==== 1862 ====
- Advance on Bowling Green, Ky., February 10–15
- Advance on Nashville, Tenn., February 22–25.
- Occupation of Nashville February 25 to March 17.
- Advance on Murfreesboro, Tenn., March 17–19.
- Occupation of Shelbyville and Fayetteville and advance on Huntsville, Ala., March 29-April 11.
- Capture of Huntsville April 11. (Pittinger's Raid on Georgia Central Railroad April 7–12, detachment.)
- Advance to Decatur, Ala., April 11–14.
- Duty along Memphis & Charleston Railroad until August.
- Action at Battle Creek June 21.
- Moved to Bridgeport and occupy Fort McCook at mouth of Battle Creek. Action at Battle Creek August 27 (6 companies), and at Bridgeport August 27 (4 companies).
- March to Louisville, Ky., in pursuit of Bragg, August 28-September 26.
- Pursuit of Bragg into Kentucky October 1–15.
- Battle of Perryville, Ky., October 8.
- March to Nashville, Tenn., October 16-November 7, and duty there until December 26.
- Advance on Murfreesboro, Tenn., December 26–30.
- Battle of Stones River December 30–31, 1862 and January 1–3, 1863.

==== 1863 ====
- Duty at Murfreesboro until June.
- Tullahoma Campaign June 23-July 7.
- Battle of Hoover's Gap June 24–26.
- Occupation of middle Tennessee until August 16.
- Passage of the Cumberland Mountains and Tennessee River and Chickamauga Campaign August 16-September 22.
- Davis Cross Roads or Dug Gap September 11.
- Battle of Chickamauga September 19–21.
- Rossville Gap September 21.
- Siege of Chattanooga, Tenn., September 24-November 23.
- Reopening Tennessee River October 26–29.
- Brown's Ferry October 27 (detachment).
- Chattanooga–Ringgold campaign November 23–27.
- Orchard Knob November 23.
- Battle of Lookout Mountain November 23–24.
- Battle of Missionary Ridge November 25.
- Ringgold Gap, Taylor's Ridge, November 27.

==== 1864 ====
- Demonstration on Dalton, Ga., February 22–27, 1864.
- Tunnel Hill, Buzzard's Roost Gap and Rocky Faced Ridge February 23–25.
- Atlanta campaign May 1 to September 8.
- Demonstrations on Rocky Faced Ridge May 8–11.
- Buzzard's Roost Gap or Mill Creek May 9.
- Battle of Resaca May 14–15.
- Advance on Dallas May 18.
- Battle of Cassville May 19–22.
- Operations on line of Pumpkin Vine Creek and battles about Dallas, New Hope Church and Allatoona Hills May 25-June 5.
- Pickett's Mill May 27.
- Operations about Marietta and against Kennesaw Mountain June 10-July 2.
- Pine Hill June 11–14.
- Lost Mountain June 15–17.
- Battle of Kennesaw Mountain June 27.
- Ruff's Station July 4.
- Chattahoochie River July 5–17.
- Buckhead, Nancy's Creek, July 18.
- Battle of Peachtree Creek July 19–20.
- Siege of Atlanta July 22-August 25.
- Utoy Creek August 6–7.
- Flank movement on Jonesboro August 25–30.
- Red Oak August 29.
- Battle of Jonesboro August 31-September 1.
- Operations against Hood in northern Georgia and northern Alabama September 29-November 3.
- Cassville November 7.
- March to the Sea November 15-December 10.
- Siege of Savannah December 10–21.

==== 1865 ====
- Campaign of the Carolinas January to April, 1865.
- Taylor's Hole Creek, Averysboro, N.C., March 16.
- Battle of Bentonville March 19–21.
- Occupation of Goldsboro March 24.
- Advance on Raleigh April 10–14.
- Occupation of Raleigh April 14.
- Bennett's House April 26.
- Surrender of Johnston and his army.
- March to Washington, D.C., via Richmond, Va., April 20-May 19.
- Grand Review of the Armies May 24.
- Moved to Louisville, Ky., June 6.

== Casualties ==
The regiment lost a total of 332 men during service; 7 officers and 130 enlisted men killed or mortally wounded, 3 officers and 192 enlisted men died of disease.

== Commanders ==
- Colonel Joshua Woodrow Sill - promoted to brigadier general, July 16, 1862
- Colonel Oscar Fitzallen Moore - resigned July 20, 1864
- Captain Ephraim J. Ellis - commander at the battle of Stones River

== Notable members ==
Of the 24 men (including 2 civilians) who participated in Andrews' Raid, eight were from the 33rd Ohio Volunteer Infantry. All from the 33rd Ohio who participated, except Corporal Samuel Llewellyn, were awarded the Medal of Honor.

- Corporal Daniel Allen Dorsey - Medal of Honor recipient
- Corporal Martin Jones Hawkins - Medal of Honor recipient
- Private Jacob Wilson Parrott, Company K - first Medal of Honor recipient
- Private William Henry Harrison Reddick - Medal of Honor recipient
- Private Samuel Robertson - Medal of Honor recipient. Hanged by the Confederates, June 18, 1862.
- Private Samuel Slavens - Medal of Honor recipient. Hanged by the Confederates, June 18, 1862.
- Private John Wollam - Medal of Honor recipient

== See also ==
- List of Ohio Civil War units
- Ohio in the Civil War
