= Samuel Slavens =

American soldier and recipient of the Medal of Honor (c. 1830–1862)

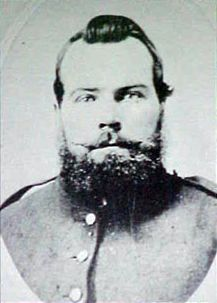
Samuel Slavens

Samuel Slavens (c. 1830 – June 18, 1862) was a participant in the Andrew's Raid and a recipient of the Medal of Honor.

== Biography ==
Slavens' birth is often disputed, with most sources listing it as 1830 or 1831. He was born in Pike County, Ohio. He served as a private in Company E of the 33rd Ohio Infantry. In April 1862, he was one of 22 Union soldiers who took part in the Great Locomotive Chase in Georgia under the direction of civilian scout James J. Andrews. Slavens was one of eight raiders including Andrews to be executed for spying. Samuel Slavens was hanged on June 18, 1862, in Atlanta, Georgia. He was buried in Atlanta and was later reburied in Chattanooga National Cemetery.

== Medal of Honor citation ==
On July 28, 1883, Slavens was posthumously issued the Medal of Honor for being one of 22 men (including two civilians) who, by direction of General Mitchell (or Buell), penetrated nearly 200 miles south into enemy territory and captured a railroad train at Big Shanty, Georgia, in an attempt to destroy the bridges and track between Chattanooga and Atlanta.
