= 2nd Ohio Infantry Regiment =

- Active: April 18, 1861 – July 31, 1861 (3 months); July 17, 1861 – October 10, 1864 (3 years)
- Country: United States
- Allegiance: Union
- Branch: Union Army
- Type: Infantry
- Size: 950 soldiers at outset of the war
- Engagements: First Battle of Bull Run; Battle of Ivy Mountain; Battle of Perryville; Battle of Stones River; Tullahoma Campaign; Battle of Hoover's Gap; Battle of Chickamauga; Battle of Chattanooga; Battle of Lookout Mountain; Battle of Missionary Ridge; Atlanta campaign; Battle of Resaca; Battle of Kennesaw Mountain; Battle of Peachtree Creek

Commanders
- Notable commanders: Col. Anson G. McCook

The 2nd Ohio Infantry Regiment was a three-month regiment and later a three-year infantry regiment in the Union Army during the American Civil War. After initial service in defense of Washington and First Battle of Bull Run, its three year incarnation served in the Western Theater in a number of campaigns and battles.

== Three-months regiment ==
With the outbreak of the Civil War in the spring of 1861, President Abraham Lincoln called for volunteers from each Northern state. In April, recruiters quickly filled the quota for a number of regiments in the state of Ohio, with two regiments enlisting for 3-months, including the 1st Ohio Infantry Regiment and the 2nd Ohio Infantry Regiment. Mustering in at Columbus, Ohio, on April 18, 1861, the 1,000-man regiment was under the command of Colonel Lewis Wilson. It soon embarked on trains for Washington, D.C., where it served in the fortifications surrounding the capital until July. It was then attached to Schenck's Brigade, Tyler's Division, McDowell's Army of Northeastern Virginia. On July 16, the regiment marched to Manassas, Virginia, then the next day occupied Fairfax Courthouse. It participated in the fighting at the First Battle of Bull Run on July 21. It retreated to Washington following General McDowell's stunning defeat. When the 3-month term of enlistment expired, the regiment mustered out July 31, 1861.

== Three-years regiment ==
After the term of service was over in August, a number of the men re-enlisted for 3-years in the reconstituted 2nd Ohio Infantry, under the command of Colonel Leonard A. Harris in the brigade of William "Bull" Nelson. The new 2nd Ohio was organized at Camp Dennison in Cincinnati from July 17 to September 20, 1861. The regiment left Ohio for service in Kentucky on September 4, operating near Olympian Springs, Kentucky, until November. It first "saw the elephant" (initial combat experience) in a skirmish at West Liberty, Kentucky, on October 23. The regiment was attached to 9th Brigade, Army of the Ohio from October until December. It served in a number of posts in Kentucky, including Louisville, through February 1862, when it was part of the army's advance on Confederate-held Bowling Green and Nashville. After briefly occupying Nashville, the regiment advanced to Murfreesboro, Tennessee, in March under Ormsby Mitchel. Five men from the regiment participated in the Great Locomotive Chase, with three being executed as spies. The regiment played a role in assaulting Confederates near Huntsville and Bridgeport in Alabama in April.

After guarding the Memphis and Charleston Railroad much of the summer, the 2nd Ohio marched back to Louisville in August and September in pursuit of the Confederate army of Braxton Bragg, eventually fighting at the Battle of Perryville on October 8 before returning to Nashville for most of the rest of the year. The regiment, reassigned to the 1st Brigade, 1st Division, XIV Corps, Army of the Cumberland, saw more hard action at the Battle of Stones River in late December and early January. There, the regiment captured the flag of the 30th Arkansas Infantry, but lost Colonel John Kell and nine other men. Anson G. McCook (of the famed "Fighting McCooks") replaced Kell and led the regiment for the remainder of the war.

The regiment remained in Murfreesboro until June when it participated in the Tullahoma Campaign, fighting at the Battle of Hoover's Gap. In the early autumn, it participated in the Chickamauga Campaign and the subsequent Battle of Chattanooga. Chickamauga in particular was hard on the regiment, with 183 soldiers killed, wounded, or captured, and 36 men who were taken as prisoners of war later died in the infamous Andersonville prison camp.

As Ulysses S. Grant's army pursued the retiring Confederates into Georgia in late November through May 1864, the regiment saw action at a number of small battles, including Ringgold, Dalton, Tunnel Hill, Buzzard's Roost Gap and Rocky Faced Ridge. It served in the successful Atlanta campaign in May, including more hard fighting at the Battle of Resaca and the fighting at Pickett's Mills, Kennesaw Mountain, and Peachtree Creek. It remained in the siege lines around Atlanta until August 1, when the much depleted regiment was ordered to the rear at Chattanooga as the term of enlistment neared expiration.

The 2nd Ohio mustered out of the Union army in Columbus on October 10, 1864. Only 350 men were still on the active roster, although less than 150 were actually in the ranks when the regiment left Georgia. A number of the healthy men re-enlisted and were transferred to 18th Ohio Infantry. Colonel McCook stayed in the army as a brigade commander, ending the war with the rank of brigadier general.

== Affiliations, battle honors, detailed service, and casualties ==
=== Organizational affiliation ===
Attached to:

- Three-month regiment attached to Schenck's Brigade, Tyler's Division, McDowell's Army of Northeast Virginia to August 1861
- Three-year regiment independent duty in Kentucky until October, 1862
- 9th Brigade, 3rd Division, Army of the Ohio (AoO), to December, 1861
- 1st Brigade, 1st Division, I Corps, AoO, to November 1862.
- 3rd Brigade, 2nd Division, Center, XIV Corps, Army of the Cumberland (AoC), to January 1863.
- 1st Brigade, 1st Division, XIV Corps, AoC, to June, 1864.
- Headquarters, XIV Corps, AoC, to June, to August 1864.

=== List of battles ===
The official list of battles in which the regiment bore a part:

- Battle of Vienna
- First Battle of Bull Run
- Battle of Ivy Mountain
- Battle of Perryville
- Battle of Stones River
- Tullahoma Campaign
- Battle of Hoover's Gap
- Battle of Chickamauga
- Battle of Chattanooga
- Battle of Lookout Mountain
- Battle of Missionary Ridge
- Atlanta campaign
- Battle of Resaca
- Battle of Kennesaw Mountain
- Battle of Peachtree Creek

=== Detailed service ===
==== 1861 ====
- Mustered into federal service April 18, 1861
- Moved to Washington, DC, April 19
- Duty in the defenses of that city to July
- Actions at Vienna, VA June 17 and July 9
- McDowell's advance on Manassas, VA, July 16–21
- Occupation of Fairfax Court House, VA, July 17
- Battle of Bull Run, July 21
- Cover retreat to Washington
- Ordered to Ohio and mustered out July 31, 1861, expiration of term
- Three year regiment organized at Camp Dennison, OH, July 17-September 20, 1861
- Mustered into federal service September 4, 1861
- Left state for Kentucky September 4
- Operations in vicinity of Olympian Springs, KY, until November
- Action at West Liberty, KY October 23
- To Olympian Springs, November 4
- Battle of Ivy Mountain, November 8
- Moved to Piketon, KY, November 8–9
- Moved to Louisville, KY, thence to camp at Bacon Creek, until February, 1862

==== 1862 ====
- Advance on Bowling Green, KY, and Nashville, TN, February 10–25
- Occupation of Nashville February 25-March 16
- Advance on Murfreesboro, TN March 17–19
- Advance on Huntsville, AL, April 4–11
- Great Locomotive Chase on Western and Atlantic Railroad, April 7–12 (Detachment)
- Capture of Huntsville, April 11
- Action at West Bridge and occupation of Bridgeport, AL, April 29
- Duty Near Pulaski May 1
- Duty along Memphis & Charleston Railroad until August 30
- Actions at Battle Creek June 21 and July 20
- March to Louisville, in pursuit of Bragg August 21-September 26
- Pursuit of Bragg to Crab Orchard, KY, October 1–15
- Battle of Perryville October 8
- March to Nashville, Tenn., October 16-November 7 and duty there until December 26
- Advance on Murfreesboro, TN December 26–30
- Battle of Stones River December 30, 1862 - January 3, 1863

==== 1863 ====
- Duty at and near Murfreesboro until June
- Middle Tennessee or Tullahoma Campaign June 23-July 7
- Battle of Hoover's Gap, June 24–26
- Occupation of Middle Tennessee until August 16
- Passage of Cumberland Mountains and Tennessee River, and Chickamauga Campaign August 16-September 24
- Battle of Chickamauga September 19–20
- Rossville Gap September 21
- Siege of Chattanooga, TN, September 24-November 23
- Chattanooga-Ringgold Campaign November 23–27
- Orchard Knob November 23
- Lookout Mountain November 24
- Battle of Missionary Ridge November 25
- Pea Vine Valley November 26
- Graysville, AL, November 26
- Ringgold, GA, November 27-February 21, 1864

==== 1864 ====
- Reconnaissance of Dalton, GA, February 22–27, 1864.
- Atlanta Campaign May 1 to July 25
- Skirmishes at Tunnel Hill, May 6–7
- Demonstration on Rocky Faced Ridge and Dalton May 8–11
- Battle of Resaca May 14–15
- Advance on Dallas May 18–25
- Operations on line of Pumpkin Vine Creek and battles about Dallas, New Hope Church and Allatoona Hills May 25-June 5
- Battle of Pickett's Mill May 27
- Kingston, GA June 1
- Operations about Marietta and against Kennesaw Mountain June 10-July 2
- Pine Hill June 11–14
- Lost Mountain June 15–17
- Assault on Kennesaw June 27
- Ruff's Station July 4
- Chattahoochie River July 5–17
- Buckhead, Nancy's Creek, July 18
- Peach Tree Creek July 19–20
- Siege of Atlanta July 22–26
- Ordered to Chattanooga, August 1
- Ordered to the rear for muster out
- Mustered out October 10, 1864, expiration of term
- Recruits transferred to 18th Ohio Volunteer Infantry October 31

=== Casualties ===
The regiment lost a total of 243 men during service; 9 officers and 96 enlisted men killed or mortally wounded, 138 enlisted men died of disease.

== Notable members ==
Six men from the regiment received the Medal of Honor (MoH) for their actions during the Civil War:

- Corporal William Pittenger, Company G - (Andrews Raid)
- Sergeant Major Marion A. Ross - (Andrews Raid) Hanged by the Confederates, June 18, 1862. Received MoH posthumously.
- Private James (Ovid Wellford) Smith, Company I - (Andrews Raid)
- Private William Surles, Company G - (Battle of Perryville: "In the hottest part of the fire he stepped in front of his colonel to shield him from the enemy's fire."
- Charles Perry Shadrach - (Andrews Raid). Hanged by the Confederates, June 18, 1862. Real name was Phillip Gephart Shadrach. MOH authorized under Public Law January 28, 2008 (H.R. 4986; sec 564), however, by omission, this was not awarded.
- George Davenport Wilson - (Andrews Raid). Hanged by the Confederates, June 18, 1862. MOH authorized under Public Law January 28, 2008 (H.R. 4986; sec 565) however, by omission, this was not awarded.

Another notable member was Charles Wright Miner, who remained in the army until 1903 and attained the rank of brigadier general.

== See also ==
- List of Ohio Civil War units
- Ohio in the Civil War
