= Michael Weimer =

17th Sergeant Major of the US Army

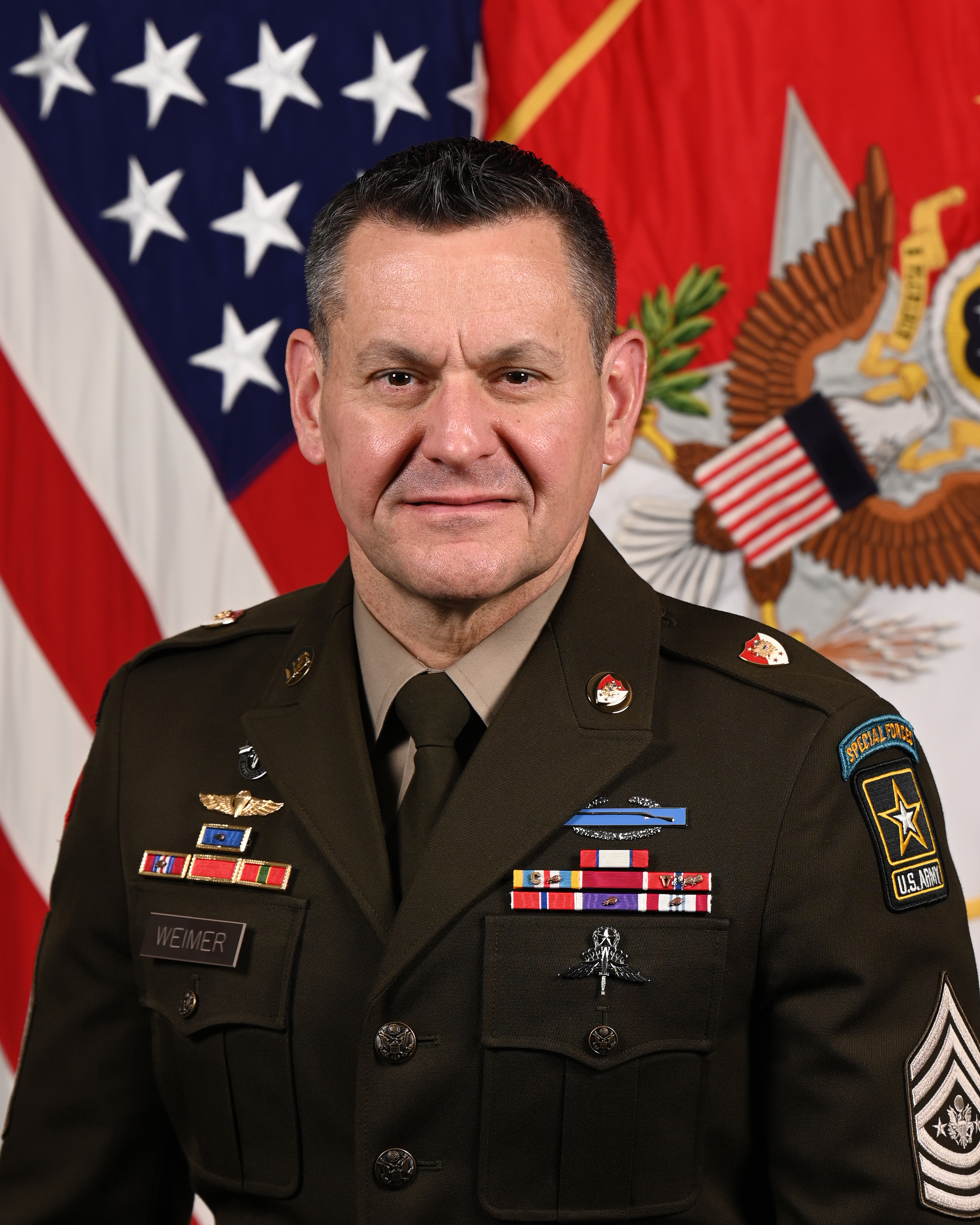
- Born: c. 1971 (age 54–55)
- Military career
- Allegiance: United States
- Branch: United States Army
- Service years: 1993–present
- Rank: Sergeant Major of the Army
- Units: Headquarters, Department of the Army; United States Army Special Operations Command; Special Operations Command Central; Combined Joint Special Operations Task Force – Afghanistan; 1st Special Forces Operational Detachment–Delta; 7th Special Forces Group
- Conflicts: War in Afghanistan; Iraq War; Operation Inherent Resolve
- Awards: Army Distinguished Service Medal; Defense Superior Service Medal (2); Legion of Merit; Bronze Star Medal (9); Purple Heart (2)

Michael R. Weimer (born c. 1971) is an American soldier who has served as Sergeant Major of the Army since August 4, 2023. He previously served as the command sergeant major at the United States Army Special Operations Command.

== Education ==
Weimer is a graduate of Norwich University, where he was awarded a bachelor's degree in strategic studies and defense analysis.

== Military career ==
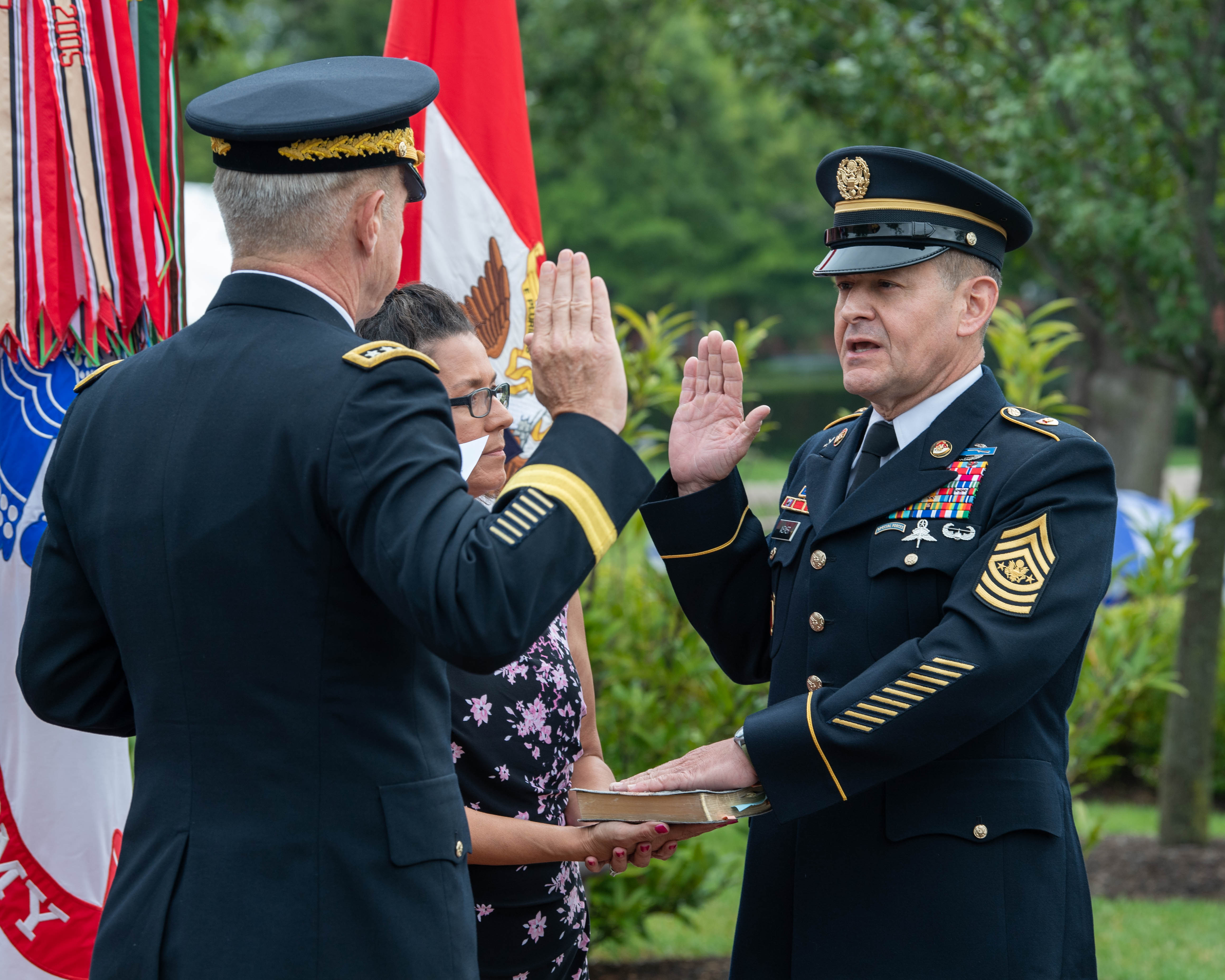
Weimer is sworn in as the 17th sergeant major of the Army by General James C. McConville on August 4, 2023.

Weimer enlisted in the United States Army in 1993, completed Special Forces Assessment and Selection in 1994, and earned his green beret in 1996 as a Special Forces weapons sergeant. He has served with the 7th Special Forces Group. During his 19 years under United States Army Special Operations Command (USASOC), he served as a Delta Force operator and as USASOC's operations (G3) sergeant major with tours in the United States Central Command and United States Southern Command areas of responsibility.

On 13 August 2021, Weimer assumed responsibility as Command Sergeant Major, United States Army Special Operations Command, in the change of command ceremony for Lieutenant General Jonathan P. Braga.

== Awards ==
Weimer's awards include:

Army Distinguished Service Medal
Defense Superior Service Medal with C device and one oak leaf cluster
Legion of Merit
Bronze Star Medal with "V" device and 7 oak leaf clusters (second ribbon to denote ninth award)
Purple Heart and one oak leaf cluster
Defense Meritorious Service Medal and one oak leaf cluster
Meritorious Service Medal
Joint Commendation Medal with a "V" device and four oak leaf clusters
Army Commendation Medal with a "V" device
Army Achievement Medal
Army Good Conduct Medal (10 awards)
National Defense Service Medal with one bronze service star
Afghanistan Campaign Medal with 3 campaign stars
Iraq Campaign Medal with seven campaign stars
Inherent Resolve Campaign Medal with service star
Global War on Terrorism Service Medal
Global War on Terrorism Expeditionary Medal
NCO Professional Development Ribbon with bronze award numeral 5
Army Service Ribbon
Army Overseas Service Ribbon with award numeral 5
Inter-American Defense Board Medal
NATO Medal for service with ISAF
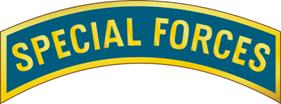
Special Forces Tab
Combat Infantryman’s Badge
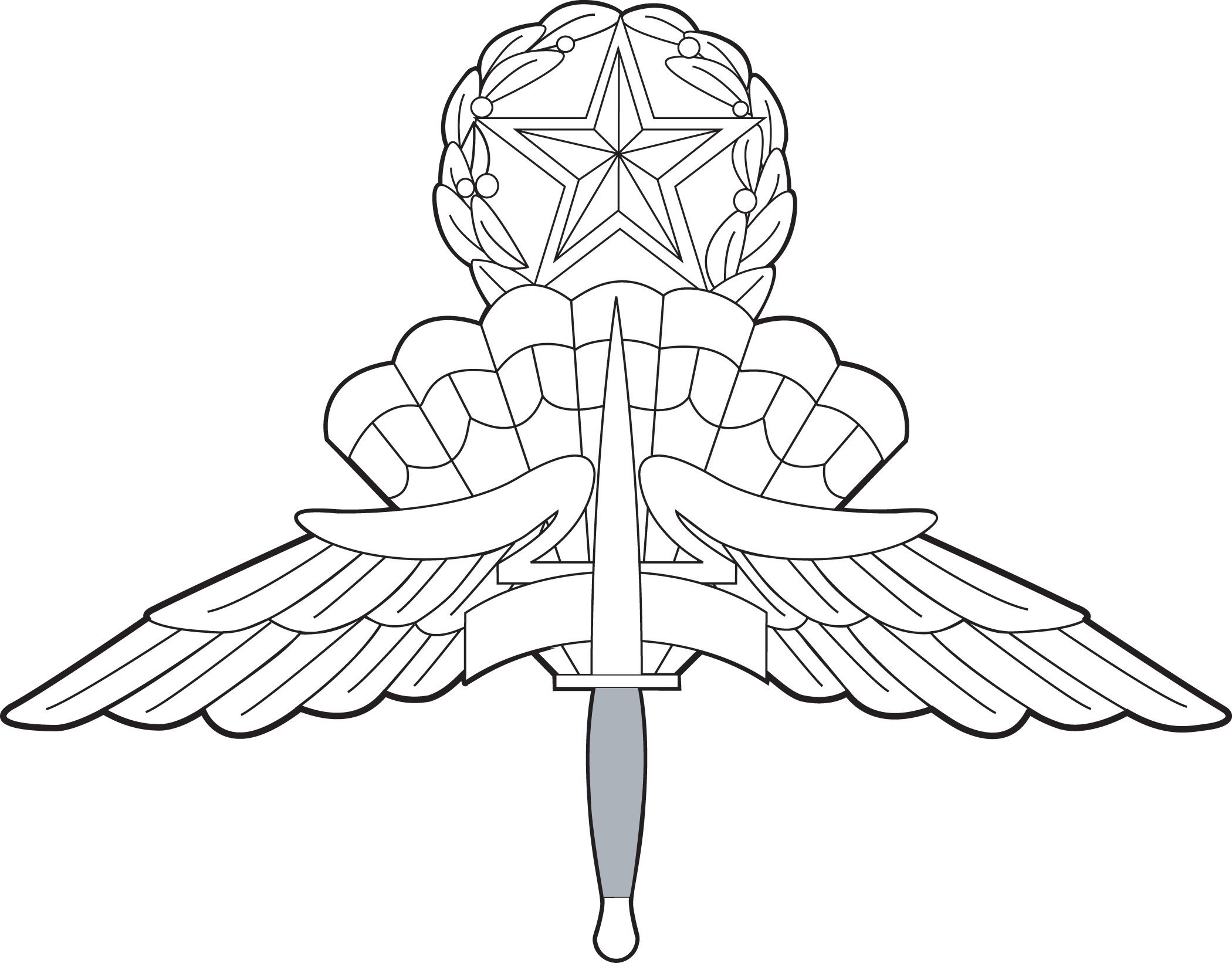
Master Military Freefall Parachutist Badge
Master Parachutist Badge
Air Assault Badge

== Personal life ==
Weimer is married and has two children. One of his daughters is currently attending the United States Military Academy at West Point.

Military offices
Preceded by Michael A. Grinston	Sergeant Major of the Army; 2023–present	Incumbent
