= Big Sandy Expedition =

1861 campaign in the American Civil War

Coordinates: 37.5956°N 82.6733°W

- Part of American Civil War
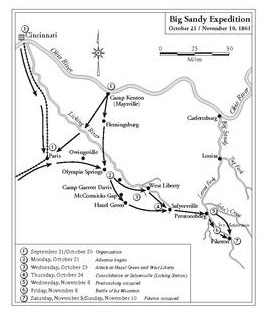
Date	October 23, 1861 – November 9, 1861
Location	Eastern Kentucky
Result	Union victory

Belligerents
United States (Union)	(Confederate States of America) CSA (Confederacy)

Commanders and leaders
B.G.William "Bull" Nelson; Col. Joshua W. Sill	Col. John S. Williams

Units involved
16th Regiment Kentucky Volunteer Infantry; 2nd Ohio Infantry; 21st Ohio Infantry; 33rd Ohio Infantry; 59th Ohio Infantry; Battery D, 1st Ohio Light Artillery; 1st Ohio Cavalry (B Company)	5th Kentucky Infantry

Strength
5,500 (twelve units of Kentucky and Ohio infantry)	1,010 (nine companies of infantry and five mounted)

Casualties and losses
Killed: 6 Wounded: 26	Killed: 31; Wounded: 55; Captured: 74

The Big Sandy Expedition was an early campaign of the American Civil War in Kentucky that began in mid-September 1861 when Union Brig. Gen. William "Bull" Nelson received orders to organize a new brigade at Maysville, Kentucky and conduct an expedition into the Big Sandy Valley region of Eastern Kentucky and stop the build-up of Confederate forces under Col. John S. Williams. This was done in three phases. From September 21 to October 20, 1861, Nelson assembled a brigade of 5,500 Union volunteers from Ohio and Kentucky. On October 23, the southern prong secured Hazel Green and the northern prong West Liberty. The two prongs were consolidated at Salyersville (Licking Station) and they began the final phase on October 31. This led to the Battle of Ivy Mountain on November 8 and the withdrawal of Confederate forces from Pikeville (Piketon) on November 9, 1861.

== Background ==
During the first week of September 1861, all pretense of neutrality in Kentucky ended when Maj. Gen. Leonidas Polk ordered Brig. Gen. Gideon Pillow advance Confederate troops up to Hickman, Kentucky. On September 18, Kentucky legislature approved the introduction of Federal troops from outside the state, the pro-Confederate legislators staying away. The next day, Simon Bolivar Buckner, former commander of the Kentucky State Guard, established a Confederate headquarters at Bowling Green, Kentucky, while troops under Felix K. Zollicoffer seized Barbourville. Shortly afterwards, Zollicoffer arrived at Cumberland Ford with approximately 3,200 men, consisting of four infantry regiments, a field battery of six guns, and four cavalry companies. This posed an imminent threat to Union control of central Kentucky, at a time when increasing numbers of Confederates in the Big Sandy Valley of eastern Kentucky appeared about to enter the Bluegrass region through McCormack's Gap (Frenchburg). In response, Brig. Gen. George H. Thomas ordered troops from Camp Dick Robinson to southeast Kentucky to halt any movement toward Big Hill, Richmond and Lexington. Former Vice President of the United States John C. Breckinridge and his ally, Col. Humphrey Marshall, added to Thomas's concerns with a call for "Peace Men" and "States' Rights Men" to assemble in Lexington for drill. However, both Breckinridge and Marshall instead rode to Mt. Sterling to join the Confederate forces in western Virginia, where Marshall took command of the Army of Eastern Kentucky posted at Piketon (Pikeville).

Several days later, "Bull" Nelson publicly announced he had established his headquarters at Camp Kenton near Washington, Kentucky and would arm and equip volunteers "to end treason" in Kentucky. The Philadelphia Press wrote that the Big Sandy expedition would prevent the Confederates from taking control of the mouth of the Big Sandy River, where it entered the Ohio River. This would protect the rear and right flank of Brig. Gen. William S. Rosecrans in western Virginia, allowing Nelson to reinforce Wildcat Mountain and to push Zollicoffer back to Knoxville.

Nelson made Olympia[n] Springs (Mud Lick Springs) in Bath County the staging area. He named it Camp Gill on honor of Harrison Gill, owner of the renowned spa eight miles south of Owingsville and twenty miles east of Mount Sterling. The Mt. Sterling-Pound Gap Road (Rt. 460) ran through McCormick's Gap (Frenchburg), the gateway to the Bluegrass Region from Prestonsburg. On September 29, 1861, Maj. John Smith Hurt occupied the vital mountain pass with three militia companies. Col. Lewis Braxton Grigsby added his 300 men to Hurt's 200 on October 8. Col. James Perry Fyffe had the 59th Ohio Volunteer Infantry Regiment march to Camp Kenton, and Col. Leonard A. Harris arrived in Olympian Springs with the 2nd Ohio Volunteer Infantry Regiment. Col. Jesse S. Norton came forward from Nicholasville with the 21st Ohio Volunteer Infantry Regiment, and during the next two weeks, Nelson's forces grew to about 5,500 men, 3,700 from Ohio and 1,800 from Kentucky.

At a farm near Prestonsburg, Confederate captains Andrew Jackson May and John Ficklin assisted "Cerro Gordo" John S. Williams with the organization the 5th Kentucky Infantry. The 1,010-man unit was badly clothed some called the hard-nosed group the "Ragamuffin Regiment." The nine companies of infantry and five mounted companies had two pieces of artillery and they carried an assortment of personal weapons that were ill-suited for warfare.

== West Liberty and Hazel Green ==
On Monday, October 21, 1861, troops that Nelson had assembled Camp Dick Robinson became engaged in a protracted fight with Zollicoffer's Confederates along the Wilderness Road at Wildcat Mountain. The next morning Nelson was unaware of this when he ordered 1,600 men under Col. Leonard Harris to advance 35 miles (56 km) to West Liberty with two artillery pieces. At dawn Wednesday, Nelson was in front of Hazel Green with about 3,500 men and artillery. Thirty-eight of the 200 Confederates surrendered after a brief fight. One hundred and twenty miles (190 km) north at West Liberty 500-700 Confederates suffered a loss of 21 dead, 40 wounded, and 34 captured. The Federal loss was two wounded. While Nelson waited for his wagon trains to catch up, he consolidated his forces at Licking Station (Salyersville). The operation resumed on October 31 and on reaching Prestonsburg they found the supposed "Gibraltar of Eastern Kentucky" abandoned.

Battle of Ivy Mountain
- Part of American Civil War
Date	November 8, 1861
Location	Floyd County, Kentucky
Result	Union victory

Belligerents
United States (Union)	(Confederate States of America) CSA (Confederacy)

Commanders and leaders
William "Bull" Nelson	John S. Williams

Strength
3,600	400

Casualties and losses
6 killed, 24 wounded	10 killed, 15 Wounded, 50 Missing or captured

== Ivy Mountain ==
Thursday, November 7, Col. Joshua W. Sill started the northern prong of the Big Sandy expedition toward John's Creek. From there he was to veer south for about forty miles and gain the rear of the enemy at Pikeville. The following morning, Nelson took the main column of 3,600 men toward Pikeville on the Old State Road (Rt. 460). Heavy rain fell in torrents as they neared Ivy Mountain, a hogback, 1,000-foot (300 m) hill about 0.5 miles (0.80 km) long. The West Levisa Fork of the Big Sandy River restricted movement on the right the seven-foot wide path and knee-deep mud forced the artillery to unlimber their guns and rig them so they could follow the infantry forward in a single file. About 15 miles (24 km) west of Pikeville, the advance guard disappeared in the elbow of the path as it turned down toward the crossing at Ivy Creek. Directly to their front, there were 250 Confederates some 100 feet (30 m) up the hill and hidden behind rocks, trees, and bushes. About 1:00 p.m., that hillside exploded with blue smoke from the doubled-barreled shotguns and old muskets carried by the Confederates. In the next instant, four Union soldiers were dead and another 13 lay on the ground wounded. Nelson rushed forward with his saber drawn, climbed up on a conspicuously located rock, and told his men "that if the Rebels could not hit him they could not hit any of them." He ordered the 2nd Ohio Infantry and 21st Ohio Infantry to push up side of the mountain and flank the enemy position from the north. At the same, Nelson had two light artillery pieces take a position near mouth of Ivy Creek and West Levisa Fork and fire directly into the enemy breastworks.

About 2:20 p.m., the 21st Ohio Infantry arrived at the top of hill. They rolled large boulders down on the Confederates who ran off in every direction. One half-hour later, Captain May had his men felling trees and burning bridges to retard pursuit. The Battle of Ivy Mountain (Ivy Narrows) was a clear victory for the Union force under Nelson who had gained full control of the field at a loss of six killed and 24 wounded. The opposing Confederates had 10 dead, 15 wounded, and 50 missing or taken prisoner. Nelson ended the pursuit beyond a burned bridge at Coldwater Creek and near the home of Unionist Lindsay Layne. Williams continued on to Pikeville where he posted a rear guard of 400 men to cover a withdrawal to Pound Gap with the remainder of his force. At 3:00 a.m. Saturday, November 9, Nelson had his troops back in pursuit. Terrible road conditions retarded movement and by nightfall, he remained 5 miles (8.0 km) from Pikeville. Early Sunday, November 10, Nelson had come to within several miles of the objective when a detachment from Joshua Sill's northern prong rode forward to advise they had secured the town at 4:00 p.m. Saturday.

In Pound Gap, Colonel Williams reported that Nelson had dispersed an "unorganized and half-armed, barefooted squad" that lacked everything, but the will to fight. The Cincinnati Commercial noted that Nelson had shown how "troops could be moved across unforgiving terrain without adequate transportation." That determination had truly surprised Williams who believed that Nelson would continue into Virginia with the intent of destroying the Virginia & Tennessee Railroad, a line that connected the Confederate capital at Richmond, Virginia with the Memphis, Tennessee and the Mississippi Valley at Knoxville. In the first accounts of the fighting at Ivy Mountain, Northern news correspondents grossly misrepresented events because their Northern audience wanted a quick conclusion to the war. Those mistakes led the Cincinnati Gazette to conclude that while a great victory had been attained, the "campaign in Eastern Kentucky has no more permanent effect than the passage of a showman's caravan. Five hundred rebel guerrilla cavalry will undo in a week the ornamental work... done at so great an expenditure of money and of most precious time." The latter issues were of great concern and the reason why Brig. Gen. Don Carlos Buell replaced Brig. Gen. William T. Sherman in Louisville. Nelson received orders to report there and his brigade followed on Sunday afternoon, November 24. As predicted, the Confederates returned and that brought Col. James A. Garfield into the region to resume the unfinished task of subduing them.

== See also ==
- List of battles fought in Kentucky
