= 1st Ohio Cavalry Regiment =

- Active: August 17, 1861 – September 13, 1865
- Country: United States
- Allegiance: Union
- Branch: Cavalry
- Engagements: Battle of Cheat Mountain (Companies A & C); Big Sandy Expedition (Company B); First Battle of Kernstown (Companies A & C); First Battle of Winchester (Companies A & C); Battle of Cedar Mountain (Companies A & C); Second Battle of Bull Run (Companies A & C); Siege of Corinth; Battle of Perryville; Battle of Stones River; Battle of Gettysburg (Companies A & C); Tullahoma Campaign; Battle of Chickamauga; Battle of Kennesaw Mountain; Siege of Atlanta; Battle of Jonesboro; Battle of Lovejoy's Station; Battle of Ladiga

The 1st Ohio Cavalry Regiment was a cavalry regiment that served in the Union Army during the American Civil War.

== Service ==
The 1st Ohio Cavalry Regiment was organized at Camp Chase in Columbus, Ohio August 17-October 30, 1861, and mustered in for a three-year enlistment under the command of Colonel Owen P. Ransom.

The regiment was attached to 1st Division, Army of the Ohio, to October 1862. (Companies F, I, K, L, and M attached to 5th Division, Army of the Ohio, May to October 1862.) Zahm's 2nd Brigade, Cavalry Division, Army of the Ohio, to November 1862. (Companies F, I, K, L, and M attached to II Corps, Army of the Ohio, to November 1862.) 2nd Brigade, Cavalry Division, Army of the Cumberland, to January 1863. 2nd Brigade, 1st Cavalry Division, Army of the Cumberland, to March 1863. 2nd Brigade, 2nd Cavalry Division, Army of the Cumberland, to October 1864. 2nd Brigade, 2nd Division, Wilson's Cavalry Corps, Military Division of Mississippi, to February 1865. 2nd Brigade, 4th Division, Wilson's Cavalry Corps, to May 1865. 1st Brigade, 4th Division, Wilson's Cavalry Corps, and Department of Georgia, to September 1865.

The 1st Ohio Cavalry mustered out of service on September 13, 1865.

== Detailed service ==
Left State for Louisville, Ky., December 9, 1861. Company B was at Headquarters of Gen. Mitchel in Kentucky October to December 1861. Action at West Liberty, Ky., October 23. Rejoined regiment at Louisville, Ky., December 1861. Operations near Greensburg and Lebanon, Ky., January 28-February 2, 1862. Moved to Louisville, Ky., February 14, thence to Nashville, Tenn., February 28-March 3. Advance on Columbia March 14–15. Near Columbia March 15. March to Savannah, Tenn., March 28-April 7, thence moved to Pittsburg Landing, Tenn. Advance on and siege of Corinth, Miss., April 29-May 30. Pursuit to Booneville May 30-June 12. Reconnaissance toward Carrollville and Baldwyn June 3. Skirmish at Blackland June 3. Osborn's and Wolf Creeks, near Blackland, June 4 (Companies E, I, and M). Guard duty along Memphis & Charleston Railroad until August. Near Russellsville July 3 (Companies B & G). Expedition to Decatur, Ala., July 12–16 (detachment). Near Davis Gap July 12 (detachment). Near Decatur July 15 (Company I). Pond Springs July 24. Courtland and Trinity July 25 (detachment). Moved to Dechard, Tenn., August 1. Salem August 6. Scout to Fayetteville August 17–20. March to Louisville. Ky., in pursuit of Bragg August 21-September 25. Pursuit of Bragg into Kentucky October 1–22. Cedar Church, near Shepherdstown, October 3. Bardstown October 4. Battle of Perryville October 8 (detachment). Pursuit of Bragg to London October 10–22. Harrodsburg October 13. Stanford October 14. March to Nashville, Tenn., October 22-November 7. Duty there until December 26. Franklin December 12 and 26. Reconnaissance from Rural Hill December 20. Advance on Murfreesboro December 26–30. Nolinsville December 26. Near Murfreesboro December 29–30. Battle of Stones River December 30–31, 1862 and January 1–3, 1863. Overall's Creek December 31, 1862. Shelbyville Pike January 5. Duty at Lavergne until June. Reconnaissance from Lavergne May 12. Tullahoma Campaign June 23-July 7. Moore's Ford, Elk River, July 2. Occupation of middle Tennessee until August 16. Expedition to Huntsville July 13–22. Passage of Cumberland Mountains and Tennessee River, and Chickamauga Campaign August 16-September 22. Reconnaissance from Stevenson to Trenton, Ga., August 28–31. Reconnaissance from Winston's Gap to Broomtown Valley September 5. Alpine, Ga., September 3 and 8. Reconnaissance from Alpine toward Lafayette, Ga., September 10. Alpine September 11. Battle of Chickamauga, September 19–21. Cotton Port Ford, Tennessee River, September 30. Operations against Wheeler and Roddy September 30-October 17. Greenville October 2. McMinnville October 4. Farmington October 7. Sim's Farm, near Shelbyville, October 7. At Paint Rock until November 18. Chattanooga-Ringgold Campaign November 23–27. Raid on East Tennessee & Georgia Railroad November 24–27. Charleston November 26. Cleveland November 27. March to relief of Knoxville, Tenn., November 28-December 8. Near Loudoun December 2. Expedition to Murphey, N. C., December 6–11. Charleston and Calhoun December 28. Regiment reenlisted January 4, 1864. Demonstration on Dalton, Ga., February 22–27, 1864 (non-veterans). Near Dalton February 23. Tunnel Hill, Buzzard's Roost Gap and Rocky Faced Ridge February 23–25. Tunnel Hill February 25. Buzzard's Roost February 27. Atlanta Campaign May 1-September 8, 1864. Decatur, Ala.. May 26. Courtland Road, Ala., May 26. Pond Springs, near Courtland, May 27. Moulton May 28–29. Operations about Marietta and against Kennesaw Mountain June 10-July 2. McAffee's Cross Roads June 11. Noonday Creek June 15–19 and 27. Kennesaw Mountain June 21. Near Marietta June 23. Assault on Kennesaw June 27. Nickajack Creek July 2–5. Rottenwood Creek July 4. Chattahoochie River July 5–17. Raid to Covington July 22–24. Siege of Atlanta July 24-August 15. Garrard's Raid to South River July 27–31. Flat Rock Bridge and Lithonia July 28. Kilpatrick's Raid around Atlanta August 18–22. Flint River and Red Oak August 19. Jonesboro August 19. Lovejoy's Station August 20. Operations at Chattahoochee River Bridge August 26-September 2. Occupation of Atlanta September 2. Operations against Hood and Forest in northern Georgia and northern Alabama September 29-November 3. Near Lost Mountain October 4–7. New Hope Church October 5. Dallas October 7. Rome October 10–11. Narrows November 11. Coosaville Road, near Rome, November 13. Near Summerville October 18. Little River October 20. Blue Pond and Leesburg October 21. Coosa River October 25. Ladiga, Terrapin Creek, October 28. Ordered to Louisville, Ky., and, duty there until December. Ordered to Gravelly Springs, Ala., December 28, and duty there until March 1865. Wilson's Raid to Macon, March 22-April 24. Near Montevallo March 31. Ebenezer Church April 1. Selma April 2. Montgomery April 12–13. Crawford and Girard April. Columbus and West Point April 16. Capture of Macon April 20. Irwinsville, Ga., May 10. Capture of Jefferson Davis. Duty in Georgia and South Carolina until September.

Companies A and C were the first to organize and were thus ordered to western Virginia September 17, 1861. Attached to Army of Occupation, western Virginia, to October 1861. Cheat Mountain District, western Virginia, to January 1862. Landers' Division, Army of the Potomac, to March 1862. Shields' 2nd Division, Banks' V Corps, and Department of the Shenandoah, to May 1862. Cavalry, Shields' Division, Department of the Rappahannock, to June 1862. Headquarters II Corps, Army of Virginia, to September 1862. Price's Cavalry Brigade, Military District of Washington, D.C., to March 1863. 2nd Brigade, Stahel's Cavalry Division, XXII Corps, Department of Washington, to June 1863. Headquarters 3rd Division, Cavalry Corps, Army of the Potomac, to December 1863. Defenses of Washington, D.C., to January 1864. Participating in skirmish at Bloomery Gap, Va., February 4, 1862. Advance on Winchester March 7–15. Battle of Winchester March 23. Occupation of Mt. Jackson April 17. Battle of Cedar Mountain August 9. Pope's Campaign in northern Virginia August 16-September 2. Catlett's Station August 22. Centreville August 27–28. Groveton August 29. Bull Run August 30. Chantilly September 1. Duty in Defenses of Washington until June 1863. Battle of Gettysburg, July 1–3, 1863. Monterey Gap July 4. Emmettsburg July 5. Hagerstown July 6–12. Falling Waters July 14. Hartwood Church August 28. Advance from the Rappahannock to the Rapidan September 13–17. Bristoe Campaign October 9–22. Hartwood Church November 5. Mine Run Campaign November 26-December 2. In Defenses of Washington, D.C., until January 1864, when the two companies rejoined the regiment.

== Casualties ==
The regiment lost a total of 204 men during service; 6 officers and 45 enlisted men killed or mortally wounded, 3 officers and 150 enlisted men died of disease.

== Commanders ==
- Colonel Owen P. Ransom - resigned
- Colonel Minor Millikin - killed in action at the battle of Stones River
- Colonel Beroth B. Eggleston
- Lieutenant Colonel T. C. H. Smith
- Lieutenant Colonel Valentine Cupp - commanded four companies at the battle of Perryville and the regiment at the battle of Chickamauga
- Major James Laughlin - commanded at the battle of Stones River
- Major Thomas J. Patten - commanded at the battle of Chickamauga

== See also ==
- List of Ohio Civil War units
- Ohio in the Civil War
