= Thomas C. H. Smith =

American soldier, lawyer, and businessman

Thomas C.H. Smith
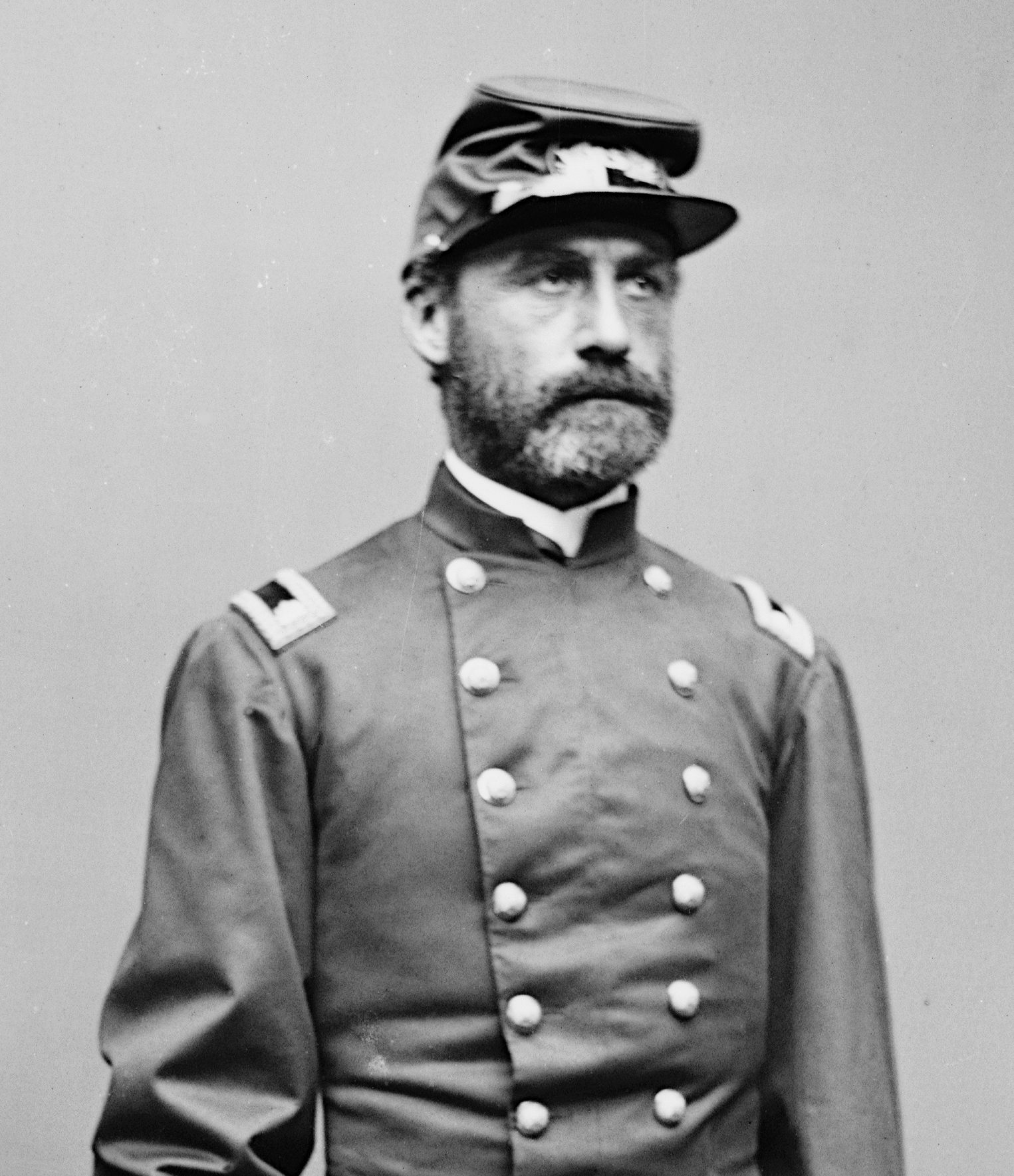
- Born: March 24, 1819; Acushnet, Massachusetts
- Died: April 8, 1897 (aged 78); Nordhoff (now Ojai), California
- Burial place: Santa Barbara Cemetery, Santa Barbara, California
- Military career
- Allegiance: United States; Union
- Branch: Union Army; United States Army
- Service years: 1861–1866; 1878–1883
- Rank: Brigadier General
- Commands: 1st Ohio Cavalry Regiment; District of Wisconsin
- Conflicts: American Civil War

Thomas Church Haskell Smith, or Thomas C.H. Smith, (1819–1897) was a lawyer, businessman, soldier and officer of the U.S. Treasury Department. He served as a Brigadier General in the Union Army during the American Civil War and was an advisor to Governor, later President, Rutherford B. Hayes. Smith then accepted a position as a Major and paymaster in the U. S. Army, after which he moved to California, where he died.

== Early and family life ==
Born in Acushnet, Massachusetts, on March 24, 1819, Thomas Church Haskell Smith graduated from Harvard in 1841, went to Marietta, Ohio, and took up the study of law. He completed his law studies and practiced in Cincinnati until 1848. On October 11, 1847, he married Lucy Woodbridge of Marietta. In 1848 he became involved in a business venture that completed a telegraph line from Pittsburgh to Cincinnati, and another line from Sandusky, Ohio, to New Orleans. In 1851 he again returned to the practice of law, this time in Cincinnati. In 1852 he became a member of the Literary Club of Cincinnati, whose members included Rutherford B. Hayes and John Pope. At a special meeting of the club on April 17, 1861, two days after President Lincoln's call for 75,000 volunteers, Smith trained with an unofficial military company organized that day from members of the club.

== Military career ==
Smith was enrolled as lieutenant-colonel First Ohio Cavalry September 1, 1861. He served with the First Ohio Cavalry in the fall of 1861 and through the winter of 1862 in Kentucky, and participated with his regiment in the siege of Corinth after the battle of Pittsburg Landing and until June, 1862. During his service with the regiment he was mentioned in special orders by General Buell for bravery and military ability while in command of a detachment of the First Ohio in a fight at Booneville, Mississippi, in June, 1862.

He was then transferred to the staff of Major General John Pope and served with him while the latter commanded the Union Army of Virginia in the summer of 1862; participating in the 2nd Battle of Manassas. Following that battle he was a witness against the accused at the court-martial of General Fitz John Porter.

He was promoted to colonel January 1, 1863, and honorably discharged April 27, 1863, by reason of appointment as brigadier general. He was appointed Brigadier General of United States Volunteers on March 16, 1863; to rank from November 29, 1862. Afterwards he accompanied General Pope to Minnesota and served on the staff in the Department of the Northwest. In 1863 he commanded the District of Wisconsin where he was cited for his work in subduing the resistance to the draft. His last command was as head of the Department of Missouri of the Military Division of the Missouri again under the command of Pope. He served as brigadier-general until January 15, 1866, when he was honorably discharged.

== Later career ==
General Smith was instrumental in advancing a campaign, begun by a contribution of five dollars from a freed slave, Charlotte Scott, towards the erection in 1876 of the Freedmen's monument in Washington, D.C., in memory of President Lincoln. General Smith remained active in business, veterans' affairs and Republican politics, although he lost much of his wealth in the Great Chicago Fire of 1871. After his friend, Rutherford B. Hayes, was elected president, Smith became one of Hayes' unofficial advisors. He was named Chief of the Appointment Division of the Treasury department, where he oversaw all matters pertaining to the department's personnel, including dealing with candidates for Treasury offices. After his service in the Treasury Department, he was appointed Paymaster in the regular army with the rank of Major on April 17, 1878. He served for a year in Washington, during which time he testified at West Point before the special commission investigating the case of General Fitz John Porter. In July 1879 he was appointed Paymaster in Santa Fe, New Mexico where he served until September 1882. Major Smith retired from the army on March 24, 1883, at the age of sixty-four, and settled in California.

== Death and legacy ==
General Thomas Smith died at Nordhoff (now Ojai), California, on April 8, 1897, and was buried in Santa Barbara, California.
