= 16th Kentucky Infantry Regiment =

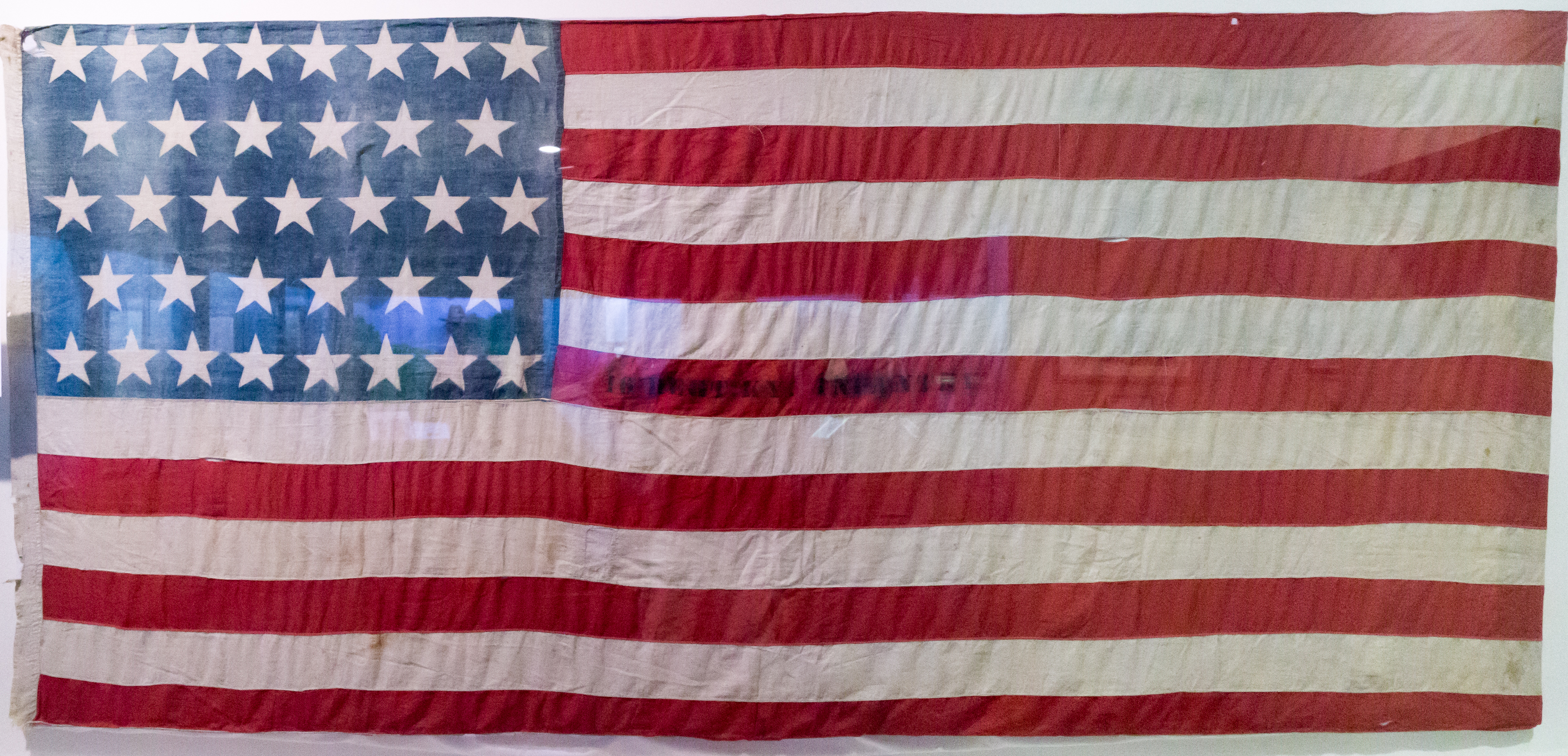
- Flag of the regiment
- Active: November 1861 to July 15, 1865
- Country: United States
- Allegiance: Union
- Branch: Infantry
- Engagements: American Civil War: Battle of Ivy Mountain; Knoxville Campaign; Atlanta campaign; Battle of Resaca; Battle of Kennesaw Mountain; Siege of Atlanta; Battle of Jonesboro; Battle of Franklin; Carolinas campaign

The 16th Kentucky Infantry Regiment was an infantry regiment that served in the Union Army during the American Civil War.

== Service ==
The 16th Kentucky Infantry Regiment was organized at Camp Kenton in Kentucky and mustered in for a three-year enlistment on January 27, 1862.

The regiment was attached to 18th Brigade, Army of the Ohio, to March 1862. Unattached, Army of the Ohio, to November 1862. District of West Kentucky, Department of the Ohio, to June 1863. 2nd Brigade, 3rd Division, XXIII Corps, Army of the Ohio, to August 1863. 1st Brigade, 2nd Division, XXIII Corps, to April 1864. 1st Brigade, 3rd Division, XXIII Corps, to March 1865. 1st Brigade, 3rd Division, XXIII Corps, Department of North Carolina, to July 1865.

The 16th Kentucky Infantry mustered out of service on July 15, 1865.

== Detailed service ==
- Nelson's Expedition into eastern Kentucky November 1861.
- Action at Ivy Mountain November 8.
- Piketon November 8–9.
- Returned to Camp Kenton and duty there and near Maysville, Ky., until March 2, 1862.
- Moved to Piketon March 2 and duty there until June 13.
- Moved to Prestonburg June 13, thence to Louisa July 15, and duty there until August.
- Moved to Covington, Louisville and Bowling Green, Ky., August. Duty there, at Shepherdsville, West Point and Munfordville until December.
- Operations against Morgan December 22, 1862, to January 2, 1863.
- Duty at Lebanon, Munfordville and Glasgow, Ky., until August 1863.
- Operations against Morgan July 2–26.
- Burnside's march over Cumberland Mountains and Campaign in eastern Tennessee August 16-October 17.
- At Loudon September 4 to November 14.
- Knoxville Campaign November 4-December 23.
- Kingston November 7.
- Lenoir November 14–15.
- Campbell's Station November 16.
- Siege of Knoxville November 17-December 5.
- Near Kingston November 24-December 4.
- Mossy Creek, Talbot Station, December 29.
- Regiment reenlisted at Mossy Creek December 27, 1863.
- Moved to Kentucky January 1864, and veterans on furlough February and March.
- Ordered to Camp Nelson, Ky., April 16; thence march to Knoxville, Tenn., and to Red Clay, Ga., and joined Sherman. Atlanta Campaign May to September.
- Demonstration on Rocky Faced Ridge and Dalton May 8–13.
- Battle of Resaca May 14–15.
- Cartersville May 20. Operations on line of Pumpkin Vine Creek and battles about Dallas, New Hope Church and Allatoona Hills May 25-June 5.
- Operations about Marietta and against Kennesaw Mountain June 10-July 2.
- Lost Mountain June 11–17.
- Muddy Creek June 17.
- Noyes Creek June 19.
- Cheyney's Farm June 22.
- Olley's Creek June 26–27.
- Assault on Kennesaw June 27.
- Nickajack Creek July 2–5.
- Chattahoochie River July 6–17.
- Peachtree Creek July 19–20.
- Siege of Atlanta July 22-August 25.
- Utoy Creek August 5–7.
- Flank movement on Jonesboro August 25–30.
- Battle of Jonesboro August 31-September 1.
- Lovejoy's Station September 2–6.
- Operations in northern Georgia and northern Alabama against Hood September 29-November 3.
- Moved to Nashville, thence to Pulaski, Tenn. Nashville Campaign November–December, Columbia, Duck River, November 24–27.
- Columbia Ford November 29
- Battle of Franklin November 30.
- Battle of Nashville December 15–16.
- Pursuit of Hood to the Tennessee River December 17–28.
- At Clifton, Tenn., until January 15, 1865. Moved to Washington, D.C., thence to Smithville, N.C., January 15-February 9.
- Operations against Hoke February 12–14.
- Near Smithville February 16.
- Fort Anderson February 18–19.
- Town Creek February 19–20.
- Eagle Island February 21.
- Capture of Wilmington February 22.
- Campaign of the Carolinas March 1-April 26.
- Advance on Goldsboro, N. C., March 6–21.
- Occupation of Goldsboro March 21.
- Advance on Raleigh April 10–13.
- Occupation of Raleigh April 14.
- Bennett's House April 26.
- Surrender of Johnston and his army.
- Duty at Greensburg, N.C., until July.

== Casualties ==
The regiment lost a total of 188 men during service; 2 officers and 50 enlisted men killed or mortally wounded, 5 officers and 131 enlisted men died of disease.

== Commanders ==
- Colonel James W. Craddock
- Colonel James W. Gault
- Colonel Charles A. Marshall
- Captain Jacob Miller - commanded at the Battle of Nashville
- Lieutenant Colonel John S. White - commanded at the Battle of Franklin

== See also ==
- List of Kentucky Civil War Units
- Kentucky in the Civil War
