= Joshua W. Sill =

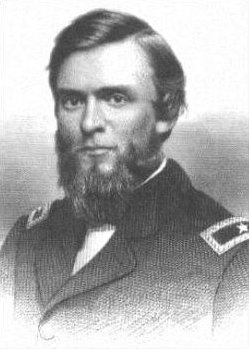
- Brig. Gen. Joshua Sill
- Born: December 6, 1831; Chillicothe, Ohio
- Died: December 31, 1862 (aged 31); Murfreesboro, Tennessee
- Burial place: Chillicothe, Ohio
- Military career
- Allegiance: United States of America; Union
- Branch: United States Army; Union Army
- Service years: 1853–1862
- Rank: Brigadier General
- Commands: 33rd Ohio Infantry
- Conflicts: American Civil War: Battle of Ivy Mountain; First Battle of Chattanooga; Battle of Stones River †

Joshua Woodrow Sill (December 6, 1831 – December 31, 1862) was a career officer in the United States Army and brigadier general during the American Civil War. He was killed at the Battle of Stones River in Tennessee. Fort Sill, Oklahoma, was named in his honor.

== Early life and background ==
Sill was born in Chillicothe, Ohio. His early education was received primarily from his father, who was a lawyer. Sill was appointed in 1849 to the United States Military Academy. During his four years at West Point he ranked among the best scholars and graduated third in his class of 52 cadets. Upon graduating, he was commissioned as a brevet second lieutenant in Ordnance, and his first assignment was at the Watervliet Arsenal in Troy, New York. In 1855 he was assigned to West Point as an instructor. After two years there, he was assigned to the Pittsburgh Arsenal as an ordnance officer.

In May 1858, Sill was sent to Vancouver in Washington Territory to superintend the building of an arsenal. Difficulties with the British government prevented the construction of this arsenal, and he was reassigned to Watervleit Arsenal. A few months later, he was ordered to Fort Leavenworth, but he resigned his commission in January 1861. He then taught mathematics and civil engineering at the Brooklyn Collegiate and Polytechnic Institute.

== Civil War ==
Following the bombardment of Fort Sumter, Sill resigned his position as a teacher and offered his services to the governor of Ohio, who appointed him Assistant Adjutant General of the State in May 1861. Here he was engaged in the organization of the Ohio forces. In August 1861, he was commissioned colonel of the 33rd Ohio Infantry and accompanied Brig. Gen. William "Bull" Nelson on the Eastern Kentucky expedition.

He was then assigned to command a brigade in Brig. Gen. Ormsby M. Mitchel's division of the Army of the Ohio. He was promoted to the rank of brigadier general on July 16, 1862. Shortly thereafter, Sill was promoted to division command but was soon reassigned to command a brigade in Maj. Gen. Philip Sheridan's division of the now-named Army of the Cumberland.

Sill took part in the bloodiest battle of the Civil War (in terms of percentage of casualties on both sides), the Battle of Stones River, just outside Murfreesboro, Tennessee. On the first day of battle, while leading his men forward, he was fatally shot. On the eve of the battle, Sill met with his commander, General Sheridan. When the conference adjourned and the officers began to disperse, Sill and Sheridan mistakenly put on each other's coats. Sill was thus wearing Sheridan's coat at the time he was killed.

== Death ==
Sill's body was found by Confederate troops, who buried it in a battlefield cemetery near the scene of his death. Sill was later interred at Grandview Cemetery, Chillicothe, Ross County, Ohio.

An epitaph from one of Sill's officers stated that "No man in the entire army, I believe, was so much admired, respected, and beloved by inferiors as well as superiors in rank as was General Sill."

== Fort Sill, Oklahoma ==
In 1869, Sill's West Point classmate and division commander, General Philip H. Sheridan, officially established a military post in the Wichita Mountains of Oklahoma. Sheridan named the military post in memory of Sill. Fort Sill is the largest field artillery complex in the world.

== See also ==
- List of American Civil War generals (Union)
- List of Ohio's American Civil War generals

== Notes ==
- Eicher, John H., and David J. Eicher. Civil War High Commands. Stanford, CA: Stanford University Press, 2001. ISBN 0-8047-3641-3.
- Warner, Ezra J. Generals in Blue: Lives of the Union Commanders. Baton Rouge: Louisiana State University Press, 1964. ISBN 0-8071-0822-7.
