= 59th Ohio Infantry Regiment =

- Active: September 12, 1861, to July 16, 1865
- Country: United States
- Allegiance: Union
- Branch: Union Army
- Type: Infantry
- Engagements: Big Sandy Expedition; Battle of Shiloh; Siege of Corinth; Battle of Perryville; Battle of Stones River; Tullahoma Campaign; Battle of Chickamauga; Siege of Chattanooga; Battle of Missionary Ridge; Atlanta campaign; Battle of Rocky Face Ridge; Battle of Resaca; Battle of Pickett's Mill; Battle of Kennesaw Mountain; Siege of Atlanta; Battle of Jonesboro

The 59th Ohio Infantry Regiment was an infantry regiment in the Union Army during the American Civil War.

== Service ==
The 59th Ohio Infantry Regiment was organized at Ripley, Ohio and mustered in for three years service on September 12–23, 1861, under the command of Colonel James P. Fyffe. The regiment was recruited in Brown and Clermont counties.

The regiment was attached to 11th Brigade, Army of the Ohio, to December 1861. 11th Brigade, 1st Division, Army of the Ohio, to March 1862. 11th Brigade, 5th Division, Army of the Ohio, to September 1862. 11th Brigade, 5th Division, II Corps, Army of the Ohio, to November 1862. 2nd Brigade, 3rd Division, Left Wing, XIV Corps, Army of the Cumberland, to January 1863. 2nd Brigade, 3rd Division, XXI Corps, Army of the Cumberland, to October 1863. 3rd Brigade, 3rd Division, IV Corps, Army of the Cumberland, to September 1864. Unattached, 4th Division, XX Corps, Department of the Cumberland, to October 1864. Tullahoma, Tennessee, Defenses of Nashville & Chattanooga Railroad, Department of the Cumberland, to October 1864.

The majority of 59th Ohio Infantry mustered out of service on October 31, 1864. Recruits and non-veterans were kept in the service as Companies I and K, 59th Ohio Infantry and mustered out at Nashville, Tennessee, on June 28 and July 16, 1865.

== Detailed service ==
Moved to Maysville, Ky., October 1. Nelson's Campaign in Kentucky October–November. Action at West Liberty October 21. Olympian Springs November 4. Ivy Mountain November 8. Piketon November 8–9. Moved to Louisa, thence to Louisville and to Columbia, Ky., December 11. Duty at Columbia, Ky., December 11, 1861, to February 15, 1862. March to Bowling Green, Ky., thence to Nashville, Tenn., February 15-March 8. March to Savannah, Tenn.; March 18-April 6. Battle of Shiloh, Tenn., April 6–7. Advance on and siege of Corinth, Miss., April 29-May 30. Occupation of Corinth May 30, and pursuit to Booneville May 31-June 12. March to Stevenson, Ala., via Iuka, Miss., Tuscumbia, Florence, Huntsville and Athens, Ala., June 12-July 24; thence to Battle Creek and duty there until August 20. March to Louisville, Ky., in pursuit of Bragg August 20-September 26. Pursuit of Bragg into Kentucky October 1–22. Battle of Perryville October 8 (reserve). Nelson's Cross Roads October 18, March to Nashville, Tenn., October 22-November 7, and duty there until December 26. Advance on Murfreesboro December 26–30. Battle of Stones River December 30–31, 1862 and January 1–3, 1863. At Murfreesboro until June. Tullahoma Campaign June 23-July 7. Occupation of middle Tennessee until August 16. Passage of the Cumberland Mountains and Tennessee River and Chickamauga Campaign August 16-September 22. Battle of Chickamauga September 19–20. Siege of Chattanooga September 24-November 23. Chattanooga-Ringgold Campaign November 23–26. Orchard Knob November 23. Tunnel Hill November 24–25. Missionary Ridge November 25. Pursuit to Graysville November 26–27. March to relief of Knoxville November 28-December 8. Operations in eastern Tennessee until April 1864. Action at Charleston December 28, 1863 (detachment). Atlanta Campaign May 1-September 8. Demonstrations on Rocky Faced Ridge and Dalton May 8–13. Battle of Resaca May 14–15. Adairsville May 17. Near Kingston May 18–19. Near Cassville May 19. Advance on Dallas May 22–25. Operations on line of Pumpkin Vine Creek and battles about Dallas, New Hope Church and Allatoona Hills May 25-June 5. Pickett's Mills May 27. Operations about Marietta and against Kennesaw Mountain June 10-July 2. Pine Hill June 10–14 Lost Mountain June 15–17. Assault on Kennesaw June 27. Ruff's Station July 4. Chattahoochie River July 5–17. Peach Tree Creek July 19–20. Siege of Atlanta July 22-August 25. Flank movement on Jonesboro August 25–30. Battle of Jonesboro August 31-September 1. Lovejoy's Station September 2–6. Transferred to XXIII Corps and ordered to Tullahoma, Tenn., thence to Nashville, Tenn., October 24.

== Casualties ==
The regiment lost a total of 157 men during service; 2 officers and 45 enlisted men killed or mortally wounded, 1 officer and 109 enlisted men died of disease.

== Commanders ==
- Colonel James P. Fyffe
- Lieutenant Colonel William Howard - commanded at the battle of Stones River
- Lieutenant Colonel Granville A. Frambes - commanded at the battle of Chickamauga

== See also ==
- List of Ohio Civil War units
- Ohio in the Civil War
- Battle of Shiloh
- Battle of Perryville
- Battle of Murfreesboro
- Tullahoma Campaign
- Battle of Chickamauga
- Siege of Chattanooga
- Battle of Missionary Ridge
- Atlanta campaign
- Siege of Atlanta
