= William "Bull" Nelson =

19th-century American naval officer and Army general

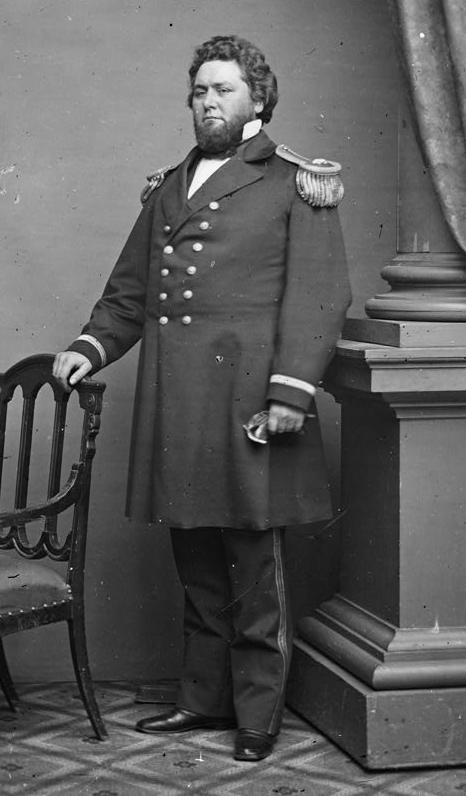
- Nelson in c. 1860-1862
- Born: September 27, 1824; Maysville, Kentucky, U.S.
- Died: September 29, 1862 (aged 38); Louisville, Kentucky, U.S.
- Burial place: Maysville Cemetery; Maysville, Kentucky, U.S.
- Alma mater: United States Naval Academy Class of 1846
- Military career
- Allegiance: United States of America; Union
- Branch: United States Navy; Union Army
- Service years: 1840–1861 (Navy); 1861–1862 (Army)
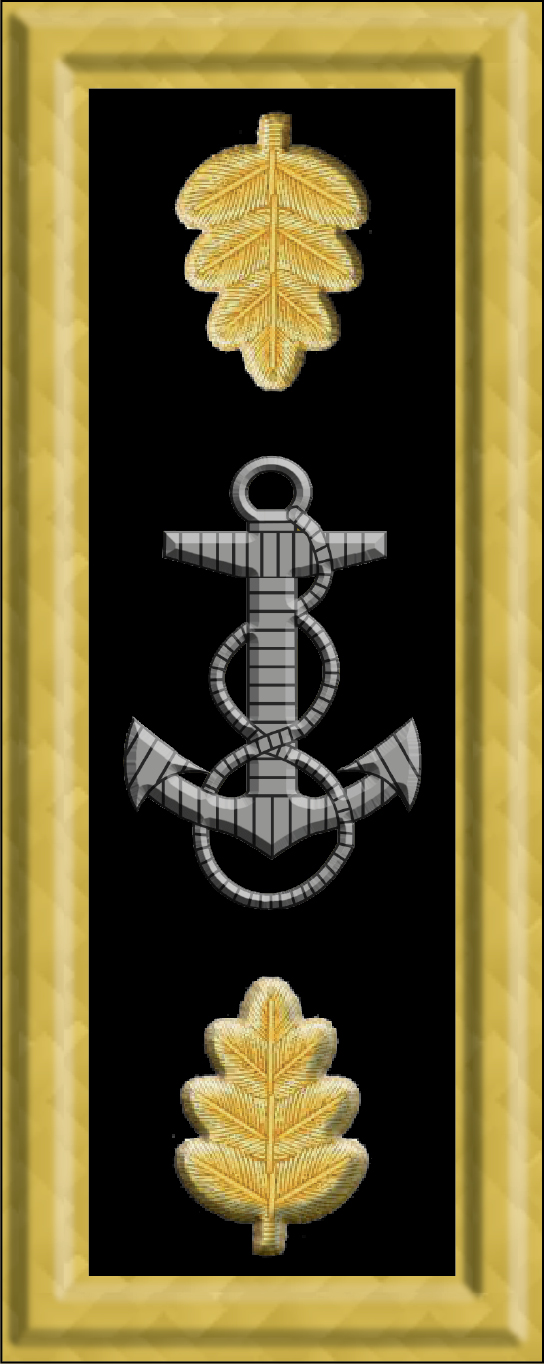
- Rank: Lieutenant Commander (Navy); Major General (Army)
- Nickname: "Bull"
- Conflicts: Mexican–American War; Siege of Veracruz; Second Tabasco Expedition; American Civil War; Battle of Ivy Mountain; Battle of Shiloh; Siege of Corinth; Battle of Richmond

William "Bull" Nelson (September 27, 1824 – September 29, 1862) was a United States naval officer who became a Union general during the American Civil War.

As a Kentuckian, Nelson could have sympathized with the Confederates but, like his state, he remained loyal to the United States of America. Secretary of Treasury Salmon P. Chase believed Nelson's actions had kept Kentucky loyal and promoted him to brigadier general in September 1861. Nelson's 4th Division bore the brunt of heavy fighting at the Battle of Shiloh and took part in the Siege of Corinth; he was the first man to enter the town.

Wounded at the Battle of Richmond, Nelson was forced to retreat to Louisville to plan a new assault. It was there that General Jefferson C. Davis, still officially on sick leave, reported to Nelson, who was dissatisfied with his performance and insulted him in front of witnesses. A few days later, Davis demanded a public apology, however, the situation rapidly escalated into a physical confrontation, which concluded in Davis mortally wounding Nelson with a pistol.

== Early life ==
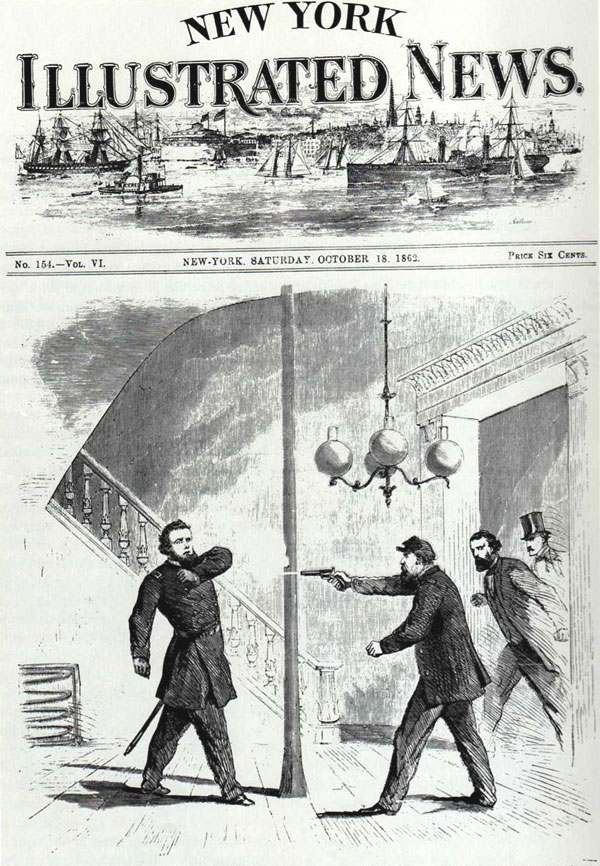
Fanciful depiction of General Nelson being shot by fellow Union General Jefferson C. Davis at the Galt House in Louisville, Kentucky, on September 29, 1862

William "Bull" Nelson was the third and youngest son of Dr. Thomas W. Nelson (1796–1849) and Frances Doniphan (1795–1845) of Maysville, Kentucky. He attended Maysville Academy (Seminary) and was enrolled in Norwich University at 13.

Two years later, Nelson's preparatory training at the Vermont military school concluded when Representative Garrett Davis secured an appointment for him to become a midshipman in the US Navy. In the spring of 1840, Nelson reported for training aboard the USS Delaware. For the next five years, he sailed the South Pacific. Nelson then joined the first class to attend the newly established Naval Academy, at Annapolis, Maryland. On July 11, 1846, Nelson became a passed midshipman, and the next October, he reported for duty aboard the USS Raritan, the flagship for the Home Squadron in the Gulf of Mexico. At the Siege of Veracruz, he served with Naval Battery No. 5, and on the second Tabasco Expedition, Nelson was a member of the Second Artillery Division. In February 1848, he became acting master of the USS Scourge. At the conclusion of his service, Nelson received a sword for heroism and proficiency as an artillerist. In the summer of 1849, he joined the Mediterranean Squadron, and on September 1, 1851, he was acting lieutenant of the USS Mississippi when exiled Hungarian revolutionary Louis Kossuth boarded the vessel to come to the United States. In December, Nelson became an escort for Kossuth's famous tour of the United States. On September 19, 1854, he was promoted to sailing master and on April 18, 1855, he achieved the rank of lieutenant. In September 1858, Nelson joined the USS Niagara for the mission of returning captured slaves to Monrovia, Liberia. Two years later, he was at the Washington Navy Yard as an ordnance officer.

== Civil War ==
=== Kentucky ===
The second day after the inauguration of Abraham Lincoln, US Navy Lieutenant William Nelson walked into the Executive Mansion with the peculiar manner of Kentuckians that said: "Here I am; if you don't like me, the worse for you." The imposing personality had served at sea for "twelve years and six months. He performed shore and other duty for over four years, and was nearly five years unemployed, making a total of twenty-one years of service" to his nation. A "striking figure" who carried his weight "lightly," he "was endowed with a strong intellect and a memory [,] which enabled him to repeat, verbatim, page after page of his favorite authors." Nelson was a "fluent and captivating talker, and when he wished to please, no man could be more congenial and companionable." Conversely, when he was "irritated or opposed," the veteran of the Old Navy could become disgustingly "dictatorial and dogmatic." He had a natural affinity for the Southern way of life, and Lincoln could see that subversive elements might want to court such a "warm hearted, handsome," and "aristocratic" individual who gave the impression of someone who was apt to "cast his lot" with slaveholders. At the request of Lincoln, Nelson measured the political currents of his native state and returned to the Executive Mansion on May 3, 1861, with "his plan for furnishing arms to the Kentucky Unionists." It was apparent to Lincoln that he had found the right man.

Nelson was to work out details for a distribution of arms in Kentucky with Joshua Fry Speed in Louisville, and as he headed off, Secretary of War Simon Cameron released 5,000 ancient Prussian flintlocks that had been converted into percussion cap rifles to shift the balance of power to the Union Home Guard.

On July 1, 1861, Nelson was detached from the Navy with instructions to organize a force of 10,000 troops for an expedition into East Tennessee. Two weeks later, Nelson spoke with Union leaders from southeastern Kentucky at Lancaster and Crab Orchard. The latter town was conveniently located at the south end of the turnpike in Garrard County and was at the head of the Wilderness Road, 65 mi north of the Cumberland Gap at the old inn at Bryant Springs, the first headquarters, and it was agreed the leaders would raise thirty companies of infantry and five of cavalry. Thomas E. Bramlette had one company in camp on July 20 and another on July 24, 1861. Some seven miles north of Lancaster and twelve miles from the rail depot at Nicholasville, Jessamine County, Richard M. Robinson offered to lease 425 acres of first-class rolling pastureland at Hoskins Crossroads. Nelson considered that to be as a much better site for a camp of instruction, and the new recruits were marched into Camp Dick Robinson, in violation of Kentucky's somewhat duplicitous position of neutrality.

On August 5, 1861, Union men in Kentucky elected 75 men to the House of Representatives who were opposed by the 24 men in the States' Rights movement. In the Senate, the Unionists elected 27 men, who were opposed by 11 States' Rights men. Thus, out of 138 seats, there were now 103 (75 percent of the state legislature) who supported the Union. Colonel Speed S. Fry marched a detachment of the Second Regiment Kentucky Volunteer Infantry (later the Fourth) toward Camp Dick Robinson, and at dusk, the First Regiment Kentucky Cavalry welcomed them with a salute from a mountain howitzer. The next day, US Representative Charles A. Wickliffe informed his colleagues in the House that Kentucky "is wholly for the Union." US Secretary of Treasury Salmon P. Chase believed that Nelson's actions were responsible for keeping Kentucky loyal to the Union and saw that Nelson became a brigadier general on September 16, 1861. He then organized a new brigade at Camp Kenton, three miles below Maysville, and marched them to Olympian Springs, Bath County, Kentucky. Near the end of October, those troops from Ohio and Kentucky routed the Confederates at Hazel Green and West Liberty. On November 8, Confederate troops, under Captain Andrew Jackson May, fought a delaying action against Nelson at the Battle of Ivy Mountain. That night and the following day, Confederates, under Colonel John Stuart Williams, abandoned Piketon (Pikeville, Kentucky). Early the next morning, Nelson's northern prong, under Colonel Joshua W. Sill, arrived at the town, which marked the end of the Big Sandy expedition.

=== Nashville/Pittsburg Landing/Shiloh ===
At the end of November 1861, Nelson joined the Army of the Ohio under the command of Don Carlos Buell at Louisville. Nelson commanded the Fourth Division and that unit became the first to enter Nashville on February 25, 1862. After Union troops recaptured Nashville, the capitol building was held by the 6th Ohio Infantry. It was there that Brigadier General Nelson was approached by William Driver, a sea captain who had retired to Nashville and remained loyal to the Union. Driver had in his possession the U.S. flag nicknamed "Old Glory" which he had hidden from rebel marauders. He requested that this famous flag be flown over the capitol building to signify the state was now held by the Union. Nelson granted the request and the flag, after flying over the capitol for a day, was returned to its loyal owner. The next month, Buell received orders to join Brigadier General Ulysses S. Grant at Savannah, Tennessee, and Nelson obtained the lead for that advance when Buell gave him permission to wade his men across the Duck River at Columbia, Tennessee. Nelson arrived at Savannah on Saturday, April 5, 1862, and at dawn the following morning, the enemy assaulted Federal troops below Shiloh Church. That morning, Grant ordered Nelson and Wallace to advance to Pittsburg Landing. By 4:30 p.m., the Confederates had driven the Union army back toward Pittsburg Landing within a mile of the Tennessee River. Fresh troops under Nelson reached the Union line around 5:30 PM, and reinforced Grant's left flank and helped repulse the final two Confederate charges of the day. On Monday morning, Nelson's Fourth Division along with Hurlbut's division led the Union counterattack on Grant's left flank. Late in the afternoon on April 7, 1862, the Confederates withdrew, and the bloodiest fighting that had ever occurred in the Western Hemisphere was over.

Ebenezer Hannaford served in the 6th Ohio Infantry under Nelson and wrote that "no commander during the war enjoyed the confidence of his troops in a greater degree than did Nelson at the head of the Fourth Division Army of the Ohio, which might almost be said to have been his own creation." Those men had no love for the harsh ways of "Big Buster," but they genuinely valued his willingness to chastise officers openly who shirked their responsibilities.

=== Siege of Corinth ===
Nelson's division took a prominent part in the Siege of Corinth. On May 21 Nelson ordered a brigade, under Colonel Thomas D. Sedgewick, to seize the high ground near the Widow Surratt House. On May 28, Nelson captured a Confederate-held crossing over Bridge Creek with Sedgewick's brigade. That was the last significant action of the siege and put Nelson's division in close proximity to Corinth itself. Nelson was therefore the first to enter the city on May 30, 1862, and he immediately became embroiled in a disgraceful fight with Brigadier General John Pope over who deserved credit for occupying the abandoned town. Several weeks later, Nelson was caught up in an ill-fated advance against Chattanooga that put him in the unenviable position of going against enemy cavalry with overburdened infantry. The Confederate invasion of Kentucky then brought him back to Louisville with instructions to reopen the lines of communication with Nashville.

=== Battle of Richmond (Kentucky) ===
The Army of the Ohio, commanded by Brigadier General Don Carlos Buell, was taking aim on Chattanooga, Tennessee. Three hundred miles of railway lines lay between Louisville and Chattanooga, and Confederate forces were making constant work in tearing up the tracks. The railroads provided the needed supplies to Union troops on the move. Consequently, Buell was forced to split his forces and to send General William "Bull" Nelson back north to Kentucky to take charge of the area. When Nelson arrived in Louisville, he found Major General Horatio G. Wright had been sent by Lincoln to take control, which put Buell second in command.

In late August, two Confederate armies, under command of Major General Edmund Kirby Smith and General Braxton Bragg, moved into Kentucky and Tennessee on the offensive to drive Union forces from Kentucky. Smith's Army of East Tennessee had approximately 19,000 men, and Bragg's Army of Tennessee had approximately 35,000. Wright ordered Nelson to move to defend Lexington, Kentucky. On August 23, 1862, Confederate cavalry met and defeated Union troops at the Battle of Big Hill. That was only a prelude to the bigger battle ahead: on August 29, 1862, portions of Smith's army met an equal portion of Nelson's force, numbering between 6,000 and 7,000. The two-day Battle of Richmond, ending on August 30, was an overwhelming Confederate victory in all aspects: Union casualties numbered over 5,000, compared to the 750 Confederate casualties, and considerable ground was lost, including the cities of Lexington, Richmond, and Frankfort, the state capital. Further losses at the battle occurred with the capture of Brigadier General Mahlon D. Manson and the wounding of Nelson, injured in the neck, who retreated to Louisville to prepare for the presumed assault. The Confederates were now in a position to take the fight to the North.

=== Death at Louisville ===
In the late summer of 1862, General Jefferson C. Davis became ill, probably caused by exhaustion. He wrote to his commander, General Rosecrans, requesting a few weeks leave. Davis stated, "After twenty one months of arduous service... I find myself compelled by physical weakness and exhaustion to ask... for a few weeks respite from duty...." On August 12, 1862, the Army of Mississippi issued Rosecrans's response in Special Order No. 208, authorizing General Davis 20 days of convalescence. Davis would head for home in Indiana to rest and recuperate.

While Davis was on leave, the state of affairs in Kentucky became quite precarious. Davis was quite aware of the circumstances in the neighboring state to the south, the Battle of Richmond, and Confederates taking control of much of the state. Smith was able to strike at Cincinnati, Ohio, and Bragg and/or Smith at Louisville. On about September 18, Davis reported to General Wright, whose headquarters was in Cincinnati to offer his services. Wright ordered Davis to report to Nelson.

By September 18, Davis had recuperated to the point that he could resume command of the forces defending against the Confederate threat to Louisville. On September 20, Davis reported to Nelson. Nelson was quite an imposing figure over Davis. Nelson got his nickname, "Bull," in no small part to his stature. Nelson was 300 pounds and six feet two inches and was described as being "in the prime of life, in perfect health." Davis was quite small in comparison, measuring five feet nine inches and reportedly only 125 pounds. Nelson ordered Davis to take charge of organizing and arming the citizens of Louisville to prepare for its defense.

On September 22, two days after Davis's initial orders from Nelson, Davis was summoned to the Galt House, where Nelson had made his headquarters. Nelson inquired how the recruitment was going and how many men had been mustered. Davis replied that he did not know. As Nelson asked his questions, receiving only short answers that Davis was unaware of any specifics, Nelson became enraged and expelled Davis from Louisville. General James B. Fry, described as a close friend of Davis, was present and would later write an account of the events surrounding Nelson's death. Fry stated:

Davis arose and remarked, in a cool, deliberate manner, "General Nelson, I am a regular soldier, and I demand the treatment due to me as a general officer." Davis then stepped across to the door of the Medical Director's room, both doors being open... and said: "Dr Irwin, I wish you to be a witness to this conversation." At the same time Nelson said: "Yes, doctor, I want you to remember this." Davis then said to Nelson: "I demand from you the courtesy due to my rank." Nelson replied: "I will treat you as you deserve. You have disappointed me; you have been unfaithful to the trust which I reposed in you, and I shall relieve you at once. You are relieved from duty here and you will proceed to Cincinnati and report to General Wright." Davis said: "You have no authority to order me." Nelson turned toward the Adjutant-General and said, "Captain, if General Davis does not leave the city by nine o'clock tonight, give instructions to the Provost-Marshal to see that he shall be put across the Ohio River."

Davis made his way to Cincinnati and reported to Wright within a few days. Within the same week, Buell returned to Louisville and took command from General Nelson. Then, Wright felt that with Buell in command at Louisville, there was no need to keep Davis from Louisville, where his leadership was desperately needed. Wright sent Davis back there.

Davis arrived in Louisville in the afternoon on Sunday, September 28, and reported to the Galt House early the next morning, at breakfast time. The Galt House continued to serve as the command's headquarters for both Buell and Nelson. That, like on most other mornings, was the meeting place for many of the most prominent military and civil leaders. When Davis arrived and looked around the room, he saw many familiar faces and joined Oliver P. Morton, Indiana's governor.

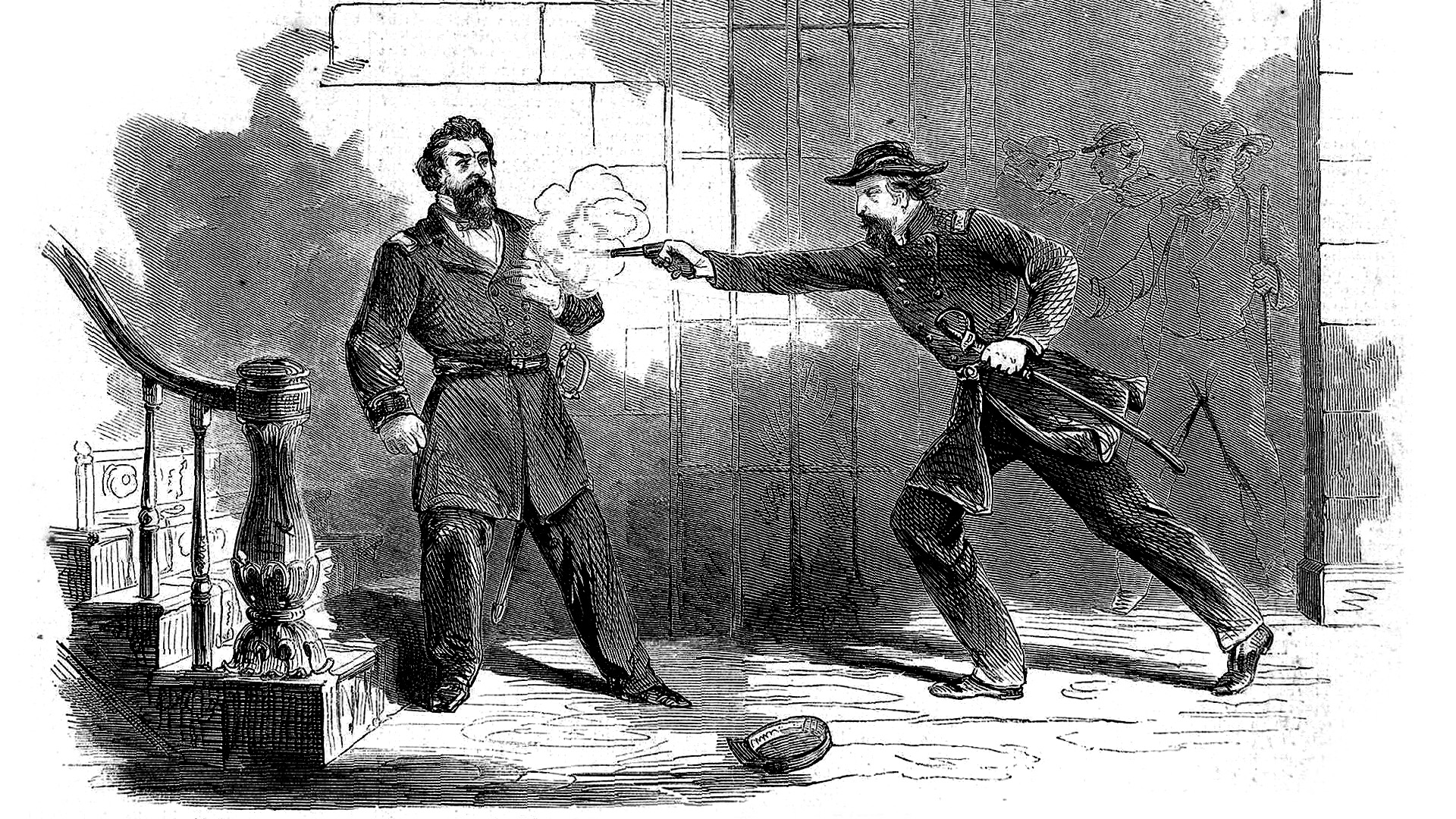
Sketch of Nelson's murder made by Henry Mosler and published in Harper's Weekly on October 8, 1862

A short time later, Nelson entered the hotel and went to the front desk. Davis approached Nelson, asking for an apology for the offense that Nelson had previously given. Nelson dismissed Davis by saying, "Go away you damned puppy, I don't want anything to do with you!" Davis took in his hand a registration card and, while he confronted Nelson, took his anger out on the card, first by gripping it and then wadding it up into a small ball, which he took and flipped into Nelson's face, the way that a child would flip a marble. Nelson stepped forward and slapped Davis with the back of his hand in the face. (Note: Some accounts say that Nelson slapped Davis twice with the back of his hand.) Nelson then looked at the governor and asked, "Did you come here, sir, to see me insulted?" (Note: Some accounts say "Did you come here to insult me, too?") Morton said, "No sir." Then, Nelson turned and left for his room.

That set events in motion. Davis asked a friend from the Mexican–American War if he had a pistol, which he did not. He then asked another friend, Thomas W. Gibson, from whom he got a pistol. Immediately, Davis went down the corridor towards Nelson's office, where he was now standing. He aimed the pistol at Nelson and fired. The bullet hit Nelson in the chest and tore a small hole in the heart, mortally wounding the large man. Nelson still had the strength to make his way to the hotel stairs and climb a floor before he collapsed. By then, a crowd started to gather around him and carried Nelson to a nearby room, laying him on the floor. The hotel proprietor, Silas F. Miller, came rushing into the room to find Nelson lying on the floor. Nelson asked of Miller, "Send for a clergyman; I wish to be baptized. I have been basely murdered." Reverend J. Talbot was called, who responded, as well as a doctor. Several people came to see Nelson, including Reverend Talbot, Surgeon Murry, General Crittenden, and General Fry. The shooting had occurred at 8:00 a.m., and by 8:30 a.m., he was dead. (Note: The events of late September 1862 had as many accounts of the events as there were witnesses to them.)

Davis did not leave the vicinity of Nelson. He did not run or evade capture. He was simply taken into military custody by Fry and confined to an upper room in the Galt House. Davis attested to Fry what had happened. Fry wrote that while Davis was improperly treated for a man of his rank, Davis never pursued any legal recourse, which was available to him. Fry attested that Davis was quite forthcoming and even included the fact that it was he who flipped a paper wad in Nelson's face. Davis wanted to confront Nelson publicly and wanted Nelson's disrespect witnessed. What Davis had not accounted for was Nelson's physical assault. Everything spiraled out of control. (Note: The events of late September 1862 had as many accounts of the events as there were witnesses to them.)

Many in close confidence with Nelson wanted to see quick justice with regards to Davis. A few, including General William Terrill, wanted to see Davis hanged on the spot. Even Buell stated that Davis's conduct was inexcusable. Fry stated that Buell regarded the actions as "a gross violation of military discipline." Buell went on to telegraph Henry Halleck, General in Chief of all Armies:

General H.W. Halleck:

Brigadier-General Davis is under arrest at Louisville for the killing of General Nelson. His trial by a court-martial or military commission should take place immediately, but I can't spare officers from the army now in motion to compose a court. It can perhaps better be done from Washington....

D.C. Buell,

Major-General.

It would be Major General Horatio G. Wright who would come to Davis's aid by securing his release and return to duty. Davis avoided conviction for the murder because there was a need for experienced field commanders in the Union Army. Fry stated in his journal, of Wright's comments, "Davis appealed to me, and I notified him that he should no longer consider himself in arrest.... I was satisfied that Davis acted purely on the defensive in the unfortunate affair, and I presumed that Buell held very similar views, as he took no action in the matter after placing him in arrest."

In all, there was no trial and significant confinement since it would appear that Davis was staying at the Galt House without guard, as is based partly on Wright's statement. Within two weeks of the murder, Davis simply walked away and returned to duty unpunished as if nothing had ever happened.

The next afternoon, Nelson was interred at Cave Hill Cemetery. Early the next day, Buell started advancing the Army of the Ohio against Confederate Major Generals Edmund Kirby Smith and Braxton Bragg.

Two days later, Buell sent a wire to Halleck in Washington to ask for a military tribunal to try Davis for killing Nelson. Halleck referred the matter to Major General Horatio G. Wright in Cincinnati and made the observation that since Buell had never proffered any charges to his attention, Davis should be returned to duty, and the matter was dropped. The only effort to prosecute Davis took place in the Jefferson County Circuit; it was removed from the docket several years later. On June 12, 1863, authorities honored the victim by naming the new supply depot in Jessamine County, Kentucky, Camp Nelson. Two months later, an escort detail removed the remains from Cave Hill Cemetery to Camp Dick Robinson. On March 8, 1872, the family plot at Maysville Cemetery became Nelson's final resting place. Today, his memory is honored by Camp Nelson National Cemetery.

As a result of the event, Davis was never raised from brigadier general to the rank of major general in the regular Army although he held the rank by brevet. After the Civil War, he returned to his permanent rank of colonel. Davis continued in military service until his death. He was the first military governor of Alaska after its purchase. He died in Chicago in 1879, still with the rank of colonel. He stated before his death that it was because of Nelson he never saw promotion beyond colonel.

== See also ==
- List of American Civil War generals (Union)
- Blockade of Africa
- Louisville in the American Civil War
- USS Niagara (1855)

== Sources ==
- Clark, Donald A. The Notorious "Bull" Nelson: Murdered Civil War General. Carbondale, Il: Southern Illinois University Press, 2011. ISBN 978-0-8093-3011-9
- Ellis, A. [Anderson] N. [Nelson]"Sketch of William Nelson," The Biographical Cyclopaedia and Portrait Gallery with an Historical Sketch of the State of Ohio 6 vols. (Cincinnati: Western Biographical Publishing Co., 1894).
- Griese, Arthur A. "A Louisville Tragedy – 1862." Filson Club History Quarterly 26 (April 1952): 133–154.
- Hannaford E, The Story of A Regiment (Cincinnati, Private Printing, 1868).
- Stevenson, Daniel, "General Nelson, Kentucky, and Lincoln Guns," The Magazine of American History 10 (August 1883).
- Tapp, Hambleton (October 1945). "The Assassination of General William Nelson". Filson Club History Quarterly. 19 (4).
- Warner, Ezra J. Generals in Blue: Lives of the Union Commanders. Baton Rouge: Louisiana State University Press, 1964. ISBN 0-8071-0822-7.
