= Camp Dick Robinson =

Coordinates: 37°41′22″N 84°39′33″W

- Camp Dick Robinson Headquarters
- Formerly listed on the U.S. National Register of Historic Places
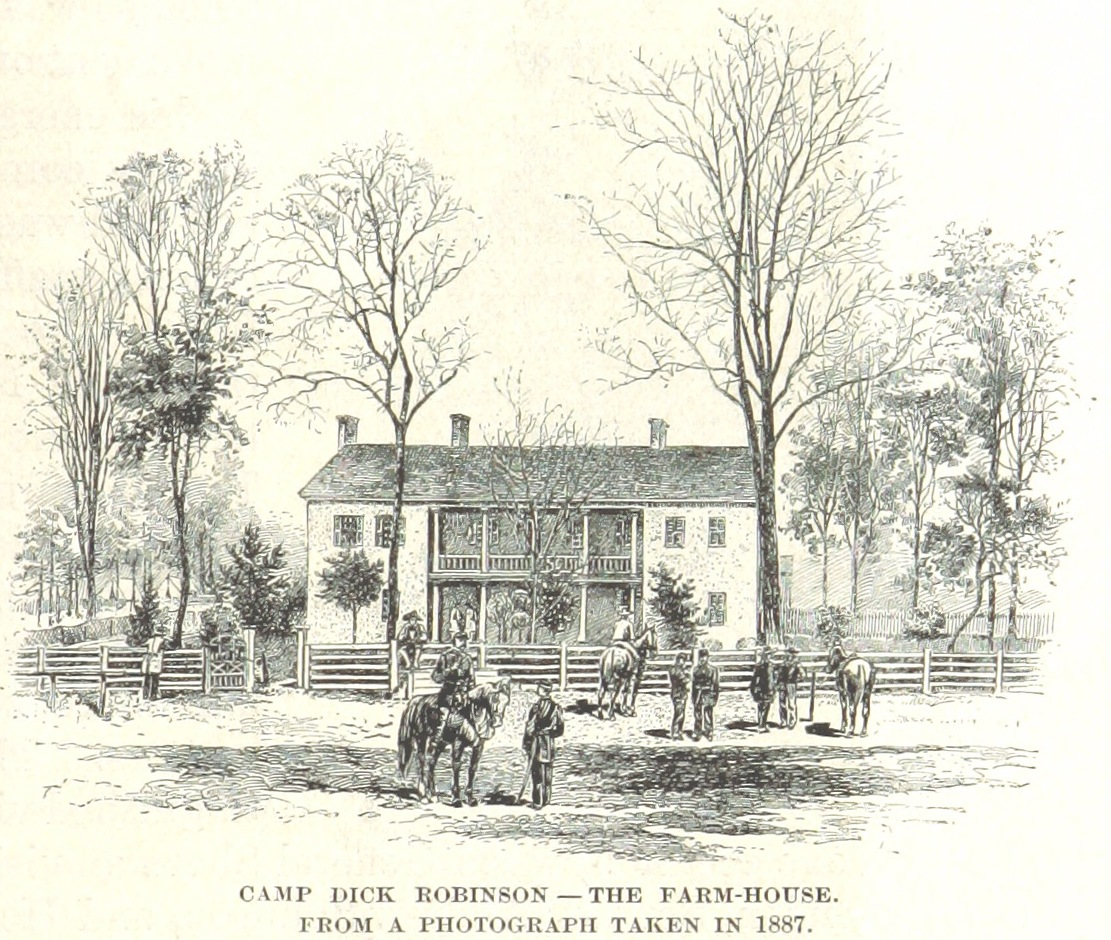
- The farmhouse at Camp Dick Robinson in 1887

- Location within Kentucky
- Nearest city: Danville, Kentucky
- Area: 7 acres (2.8 ha)
- Built: 1850
- NRHP reference No.: 76000888

Significant dates
- Added to NRHP: December 12, 1976
- Removed from NRHP: December 7, 1990

In mid-May 1861, U. S. Navy lieutenant William "Bull" Nelson armed Kentuckians loyal to the Union and that soon became the foundation for his receiving authority to enlist 10,000 troops for a campaign into East Tennessee. On August 6, 1861, those recruits marched into Camp Dick Robinson, making it the first Federal base south of the Ohio River. For Col. George C. Kniffen, "the wisdom of President Lincoln commissioning . . . Nelson to organize a military force on the [neutral] soil of Kentucky" prevented making the state a "battle ground for many months" and it thereby changed the whole direction of the war. In 1864, Salmon P. Chase declared in a speech at Louisville "when Kentucky faltered, hesitated" in the early stages of the Civil War, that undecided "status was settled by WILLIAM NELSON, at Camp Dick Robinson." Six years later, Indiana Senator Daniel D. Pratt reported to the U. S. Senate that Camp Dick Robinson "was one of the most noted military encampments of the war. . . . From its admirable locality and advantages, it was almost indispensable for the successful operations of the" Civil War.

== Background ==
With the outbreak of the Civil War in April 1861, a majority of the citizens in the Mercer, Boyle, Garrard, and Casey counties of Kentucky concluded that secession was "destructive of all permanent government and tending only to political chaos and anarchy." During the third week in May, key leaders obtained 700 muskets from U. S. N. Lt. William Nelson, and distributed those arms to loyal Home Guard troops. This gave them the ability to stand up to the secessionist State Guard and emboldened Kentuckians to elect nine of ten Union candidates on the single issue of keeping the state in the Union. That vote, on June 20, convinced Nelson that the charade of neutrality by both sides had ended. Garrard County Judge Allen A. Burton went to Washington and urged President Lincoln to organize Union men into regiments. This idea called for audacious leadership and as Burton started to leave the Executive Mansion, he encountered Lieutenant Nelson and promptly recommended him for that mission. Nelson met with Tennessee senator Andrew Johnson, Secretary of Treasury Salmon P. Chase and others to formulate a plan of support for loyalists in East Tennessee. On July 1, 1861, Nelson was detached from the Navy with instructions to organize a force of 10,000 troops. Two weeks later, Nelson spoke with Union leaders from southeastern Kentucky at Lancaster and Crab Orchard. The later town was conveniently located at the south end of the turnpike in Garrard County and it was at the head of the Wilderness Road some sixty-five miles north of the Cumberland Gap. Nelson chose the old inn at Bryant Springs as his headquarters and it was agreed they would raise thirty companies of infantry and five of cavalry. Thomas E. Bramlette had one company in camp on July 20 and another on July 24, 1861.

Confederate guerilla Champ Ferguson often targeted loyal Unionists who had been to Camp Dick Robinson, even once dear friends.

== Hoskins Crossroads ==
Some seven miles north of Lancaster and twelve miles from the rail depot at Nicholasville, Jessamine County, Richard M. Robinson owned 425 acres of first-class rolling pastureland at Hoskins Crossroads. Nelson considered this as a much better site for a camp of instruction and Robinson agreed to lease it to him. The main house was a profitable tavern with a storehouse, blacksmith shop, barn, mule-shed, and numerous outbuildings. The land extended one-half mile in either direction along the Danville and Lancaster Pikes and most importantly, it could sustain one thousand mules for four months out of the year. Water was supplied by numerous springs and the Dix River two miles west on the Danville Pike (U.S. 34). The high rugged banks of that river offered natural protection and there were "only three crossings." The upper road ran from Harrodsburg through Dicksville and to Bryantsville, the middle crossing (U. S. 34) connected Danville with Hoskins Cross Roads, the lower was the Lancaster and Danville Road. Ten miles north on the Lancaster Pike (U.S. 27) was Hickman[s] Bridge (Wernwag Bridge), the largest single-span covered bridge in the world. This double-drive 256-foot bridge also provided the only passageway above Frankfort. On the Jessamine County side was a majestic 400-foot limestone palisade, and at the top, a pleasant four-mile journey led to Nicholasville, the terminus for the Covington & Lexington (Kentucky Central) Railroad.

On August 5, 1861, Union men in Kentucky elected seventy-six men to the House of Representatives versus the twenty-four men in the States' Rights movement. In the Senate, the Unionists elected twenty-seven men versus eleven states' rights men. That meant that out of 138 seats, there were now 103 (75 percent of the state legislature) who supported the Union. The following day, U. S. Congressman Charles A. Wickliffe informed his colleagues in the House that he had learned Kentucky "is wholly for the Union." Plans called for the recruits to encamp after the election, and Col. Speed S. Fry started a detachment of the Second Regiment Kentucky Volunteer Infantry (later the Fourth) toward Camp Dick Robinson. At dusk, the First Regiment Kentucky Cavalry welcomed them with a salute from a mountain howitzer.

The official dedication took place on August 10, and the following day the editor of the Louisville Journal, George D. Prentice, declared that intentions to supply these Union volunteers with arms was as "equipped for mischief as if it had been contrived . . . by the Devil himself." The "Covington Journal" gleefully reported that other Old Whigs "are making efforts to arrest the movement, and break up the camps." The perplexed Nelson wrote to Sen. John J. Crittenden that he did not understand why "a camp of loyal . . . Kentuckians" assembled under the flag of the Union . . . upon their native soil should be cause of apprehension." On August 13, Nelson received additional instructions to those of July 1, 1861, that called for him to also "accept and muster in wherever offered regiments for service in Tennessee and Kentucky in such numbers and of such arms as you may consider necessary for the best interests of the country." That same morning thirteen carloads of food, military clothing, and arms went forward from Covington. On August 22, 1861, Nelson distributed the long-delayed weapons and equipment to the troops at Camp Dick Robinson.

Secretary Chase advised Garrett Davis the president would not "disavow, directly or by implication, the action of Lieutenant Nelson under the sanction of his [Lincoln's] own authority, given at the urgent instance of some of the wisest & best Union men in Ky. & Tenn." On August 26, Governor Beriah Magoffin received a reply from President Lincoln that stated Camp Dick Robinson was "established at the request of many Kentuckians." He said they were an "indigenous force" and therefore would "respectively decline to remove" them.

At the end of August, Nelson had 3,200 troops, 7,000 arms, and 6 pieces of artillery. There were 1,000 troops in Col. Robert K. Byrd's First Regiment Tennessee Volunteer Infantry and Col. James P. T. Carter's Second Regiment of Tennessee Volunteer Infantry. Col. Thomas E. Bramlette's, Third Regiment Kentucky Volunteer Infantry had about 600 men. Col. Speed S. Fry's Fourth Regiment Kentucky Volunteer Infantry had about 600 men; and Col. Theophilus T. Garrard's Seventh Regiment Kentucky Volunteer Infantry about 600 men. The First Regiment Kentucky Volunteer Cavalry under Col. Frank Wolford had about 400 troops and Capt. John M. Hewitt, Battery B, First Kentucky Artillery about 20 men. At Knoxville, Confederate Brig. Gen. Felix K. Zollicoffer was informed that Nelson was being reinforced by another "400 or 500 [men] per day."

Many believed the Confederates were about to make a two-column advance from Knoxville and Nashville that was to join with secessionists in Kentucky to "seize Frankfort, occupy Louisville, and carry the state out of the Union." That threat led Garrett Davis to say Camp Dick Robinson "must not be removed, even if it be the cause of civil war." Indiana Governor Oliver P. Morton feared "the conspiracy to precipitate Kentucky into a revolution is complete. . . . [He declared] If we lose Kentucky now, God help us." On September 3, all pretense of neutrality in Kentucky ended when Confederate troops moved up into western Kentucky and occupied Columbus. The Kentucky General Assembly promptly asked Governor Magoffin to "call out the military force of the State to expel and drive out the invaders."

== Change of command ==
Brig. Gen. Robert Anderson had previously obtained permission to replace Lt. Nelson with a regular army officer, and on September 15, Brig. Gen. George H. Thomas assumed command at Camp Dick Robinson. Nelson received an appointment to Brigadier General of Volunteers with orders to raise another brigade and stop a Confederate incursion toward Lexington from eastern Kentucky. On September 19, Confederate troops under Brig. Gen. Felix Zollicoffer seized Barbourville, Kentucky, and made that a base of operations for an intended advance against Richmond and Lexington. Ten days later, President Lincoln wrote to Indiana's Governor Morton to say he hoped "Zollicoffer has left Cumberland Gap (though I fear he has not, because, it he has, I rather infer his dread of Camp Dick Robinson, reinforced from Cincinnati, moving on him, than because of his intention to move on Louisville."

There were some 6,000-8,000 Confederates at Barbourville, and Lincoln made a memorandum that he wanted a movement made about October 5 "to seize and hold a point on the railroad connecting Virginia and Tennessee near . . . Cumberland Gap." Thomas had 9,000 troops, and he ordered those previously assembled by Nelson beyond Crab Orchard and east into the Rockcastle Hills to keep the enemy from coming north on the Wilderness Road. On October 21, those Union volunteers defeated the Confederates at the Battle of Camp Wildcat. At the end of November, Thomas went in pursuit of Zollicoffer near Somerset, and Camp Dick Robinson continued to serve as a receiving area for new troops that joined in the Battle of Mill Springs on January 19, 1862. That victory enabled the Army of the Ohio to march into middle Tennessee and occupy Nashville in late February.

== Second phase ==
In August 1862, Confederate Maj. Gen. Edmund Kirby Smith entered Kentucky with 12,000 troops that he advanced against Richmond and Lexington. Kirby Smith ordered the dispersal of the Garrard County Home Guard on September 27, and Maj. Gen. Braxton Bragg directed that the Confederate depot at Danville "be transferred as rapidly as practicable to Bryantsville and Camp Dick Robinson, where all supplies will in the future be concentrated." Bragg then ordered the establishment of "a camp of instruction for new troops . . . at or near the site of Old Camp Dick Robinson, to be known as Camp Breckinridge." The recruits were to form at Bryantsville and report to Simon Bolivar Buckner who had arms and ammunition ready to issue to them. Some ten days later, Bragg discovered during the bloody Battle of Perryville the Army of the Ohio outnumbered him and he chose to withdraw from Kentucky. On October 13, his troops departed from Camp Breckinridge. Three days later, the Third Regiment Ohio Volunteer Cavalry arrived at Camp Dick Robinson and found Col. W. A. Hoskins in charge of stores abandoned by the Confederate Army. In the early spring of 1863, plans to conduct the long-neglected East Tennessee expedition led to Maj. Gen. Ambrose E. Burnside's becoming commander of the newly reformed Army of the Ohio. Those troops departed from Camp Nelson on August 12, and nine days later, 'the largest concourse ever assembled in Garrard County" observed the re-interment of William "Bull" Nelson behind the original headquarters home at Camp Dick Robinson.

== After the Civil War ==
The government lease of the Richard M. Robinson farm ended on June 1, 1865. The following month, friends and associates of William Nelson commemorated his service by raising a huge silk flag up a 130-foot pole beside his grave on July 4. Two years later, citizens angered over federal policies in Kentucky cut the flagpole down. The monies due Colonel Robinson for the use of his home and land from 1862 to 1865 remained due, and he filed claim right after this incident. In June 1869, he died bankrupt at age 51. The claim had not been satisfied, and a Congressional committee recommended that his widow, Margaret P. Robinson, be paid $7,420 for rent. The Quartermaster General denied the rest of the claim, and it took a joint resolution to approve the payment of $5,878.30 on July 15, 1870. By 1872, the great significance that once surrounded Camp Dick Robinson was gone, and Matilda Nelson Stockton had the remains of her brother, Maj. Gen. William Nelson, removed to the family plot at Maysville Cemetery. Margaret P. Robinson sold part of the farm in 1884, and eleven years later Lynn Hudson sold the home and 335 acres. In 1905, Hudson sold the last parcel of land associated with Camp Dick Robinson. The year before, Margaret P. Robinson had sued the U. S. government for reimbursement of $1,030.15 for lodging of troops, pasturage of cattle, and 980 bushels of salt supplied to troops in Tuscumbia, Alabama. In late 1906, the court decided that $227 represented a "reasonable" amount still due her.

== Present ==
In 1990, the National Register of Historic Places added the Robinson house to the listings for Garrard County. New owners subsequently added a brick facade which led to the removal of the building from the register. The original appearance of the land suffered as a result of road development along U.S. 27, and work was done to establish a new marker.
