= Gibbs (surname) =

Gibbs (usually pronounced /ɡɪbz/) is an Anglo-Scottish surname. It comes from the Gibbs clan in the Scottish Highlands.

== Notable people with the surname ==
- Alan Gibbs (born 1939), New Zealand-born businessman, entrepreneur and art collector
- Alfred Gibbs (1823–1868), brigadier general in the Union Army during the American Civil War
- Alfred W. Gibbs, Chief Mechanical Engineer of the Pennsylvania Railroad
- Alison Gibbs, Canadian statistician
- Antony Gibbs (1756–1816), founder of British trading company Antony Gibbs & Sons
- Antony Gibbs (1925–2016), British film and television editor
- Armstrong Gibbs (1889–1960), English composer
- Barnett Gibbs (1851–1904), American politician from Texas
- Bob Gibbs (born 1954), American politician from Ohio
- Brian Gibbs (1936–2014), English footballer and manager
- Bruce_Gibbs, LCK gundam jockey, aerodynamicist
- Caleb Gibbs (1748–1818), American soldier, commander of George Washington's "life guard"
- Calvin Gibbs, US Army soldier convicted of the murder of three Afghan civilians in 2010
- Charles Gibbs, pseudonym of American pirate James D. Jeffers (1798–1831)
- Connor Gibbs (American football), American football player
- Cory Gibbs (born 1980), American soccer player
- Coy Gibbs (1972–2022), American NASCAR driver, football player, and coach
- Dan Gibbs (born 1976), American politician from Colorado
- Dick Gibbs (1892–1915), Australian rules footballer
- Dick Gibbs (basketball) (born 1948), American basketball player
- Donnie Gibbs (1945–2006), American football player
- Drew Gibbs (1962–2021), American college football coach
- Easton Gibbs, American football player
- Frederic A. Gibbs (1903–1992), American neurologist
- Frederick Gibbs (educationalist) (1866–1953), New Zealand school principal, educationalist and community leader
- Frederick S. Gibbs (1845–1903), American politician from New York
- Frederick J. Gibbs (1899–1963), British World War I flying ace
- Freddie Gibbs (born 1982) American musician
- Fredia Gibbs (born 1963) American martial artist, kickboxer and boxer
- Geoff Gibbs (1940–2006), Australian actor and drama teacher
- George Gibbs (disambiguation), several people
- Georgia Gibbs (1918–2006), American popular singer
- Gerald Gibbs, multiple people
- Glover Gibbs of Gibbs family (bakers) of South Australia
- Henry Gibbs (1630/1–1713), British oil painter
- Herschelle Gibbs (born 1974), South African cricketer
- Humphrey Gibbs (1902–1990), British governor of Southern Rhodesia
- Ione Wood Gibbs (c.1871–1923), American educator, journalist, and clubwoman
- J. D. Gibbs (Jason Dean Gibbs, 1969–2019), American racing driver
- Jahmyr Gibbs (born 2002), American football player
- Jake Gibbs (born 1938), American baseball player and college sports coach
- James Gibbs (disambiguation), several people
- Janie Lou Gibbs (1932–2010), American serial killer
- Janno Gibbs (born 1969), Philippine singer-songwriter, actor and comedian
- Joe Gibbs (born 1940), American football coach and motorsport team owner
- Joe Gibbs (record producer) (1942–2008; born Joel Gibson), Jamaican record producer
- Joe Gibbs (cricketer) (1946–2011), Grenadian cricketer
- John Gibbs (disambiguation), several people
- Jonathan Gibbs (disambiguation), several people
- Josiah Willard Gibbs Sr. (1790–1861), American linguist
- Josiah Willard Gibbs (1839–1903), American mathematical physicist
- Julia de Wolf Gibbs (1866–1952), American author and craftsman
- June Gibbs (1922–2012), American politician from Rhode Island
- Keith Gibbs (born 1933), South African cricketer
- Kieran Gibbs (born 1989), English football player
- Lance Gibbs (born 1934), West Indies cricketer
- Leonard Gibbs (musician) (1948–2021), American percussionist
- Leonard W. H. Gibbs (1875–1930), American politician from New York
- Lilian Gibbs (1870–1925), British botanist
- Madarious Gibbs (born 1993), American basketball player
- Marla Gibbs (born 1931), American actress
- Mary Elizabeth Gibbs (1836–1920), New Zealander
- May Gibbs (1877–1969), Australian children's author, illustrator and cartoonist
- Michael Gibbs (disambiguation), several people
- Mifflin Wistar Gibbs (1823–1915), American-Canadian politician, businessman, and advocate for Black rights
- Nigel Gibbs (born 1965), English professional football manager and former player
- Nicholas Gibbs (1733–1817), early American pioneer.
- Nicole Gibbs (born 1993), American tennis player
- Norman E. Gibbs (1941–2002), American software engineer, scholar and educational leader
- Norman Gibbs (Canadian football) (born 1960), American football player
- Oliver Wolcott Gibbs (1822–1908), American chemist
- Pat Gibbs (born 1950), American football player
- Patrick Gibbs (1915–2008), Welsh World War II pilot, author and film critic
- Paul Gibbs (disambiguation), several people
- Peter Gibbs (disambiguation), several people
- Sir Philip Gibbs (1877–1962), English journalist and novelist
- Reggie Gibbs (1882–1938), Welsh international rugby player
- Robert Gibbs (disambiguation), several people
- Roger Gibbs (1934–2018), British financier
- Roland Gibbs (1921–2004), British military officer
- Ronald James Gibbs (1947–2023), known as Ronaldo Valdez, Philippine actor
- Scott Gibbs (born 1971), Welsh rugby footballer
- SherRhonda Gibbs, U.S. academic administrator and researcher
- Terri Gibbs (born 1954), American country music artist
- Terry Gibbs (born 1924), American jazz musician (vibraphone)
- Thomas Gibbs (disambiguation), several people
- Timothy Gibbs (born 1967), American director, actor, producer, and screenwriter
- Washington Dorsey Gibbs (1839–1915), American politician from Mississippi
- William Gibbs (disambiguation), several people
- Wolcott Gibbs (1902–1958), American editor, humorist, theatre critic, playwright and author

== Fictional characters with the surname ==
- Leroy Jethro Gibbs, main character of American TV series NCIS
- Joshamee Gibbs, character in American Pirates of the Caribbean films

== See also ==
- Gibb (surname)
- Gibbes (surname)
