= GIP =

GIP or Gip may refer to:

== Businesses and organisations ==
- Gaumee Itthihaad, a political party in Maldives
- General Intelligence Presidency, the primary intelligence agency of Saudi Arabia
- Ghetto Informant Program, of the U.S. Federal Bureau of Investigation
- Georgia Innocence Project, an American non-profit corporation
- Global Infrastructure Partners, an American private equity firm
- Graduate Institute of Peace Studies, Kyung Hee University, South Korea
- Groupe d'Information sur les Prisons, a French organisation in the 1970s
- Global Initiative on Psychiatry
- Air Guinee Express, ICAO airline code GIP

== Places ==
- Gip, West Virginia, U.S.
- The Great India Place, or GIP Mall, Noida, Uttar Pradesh, India
- Gipsy Hill railway station, London, England, National Rail station code GIP

== Science and technology ==
- Gastric inhibitory polypeptide, also known as glucose-dependent insulinotropic polypeptide
- Genome India Project
- Graph isomorphism problem
- GSM Interworking Profile, a telecommunications standard

== Other uses ==
- Francisco João "GIP" da Costa (1859–1900), a Goan journalist
- Gibraltar pound by ISO 4217 currency code
- Green industrial policy
- Government investment pool
- Great Indian Peninsula Railway, a former rail in India

== See also ==
- Gib (disambiguation)
- Gips (disambiguation)
- Gipper (disambiguation)
- Gipp, a surname
