= Gibbs House =

Gibbs House may refer to:

- Gibbs House (Gainesville, Alabama), listed on the NRHP in Sumter County, Alabama
- William and Caroline Gibbs House, Maywood, Illinois, listed on the NRHP in Cook County, Illinois
- E.H. Gibbs House, Oskaloosa, Iowa, listed on the NRHP in Mahaska County, Iowa
- John Gibbs House (Pilotview, Kentucky), listed on the NRHP in Clark County, Kentucky
- Paul Gibbs House, Framingham, Massachusetts, NRHP-listed
- William Gibbs House, Waltham, Massachusetts, NRHP-listed
- John Gibbs House (Kalamazoo, Michigan), listed on the NRHP in Michigan
- Heman Gibbs Farmstead, Falcon Heights, Minnesota, listed on the NRHP in Minnesota
- Gibbs-Von Seutter House, Raymond, Mississippi, listed on the NRHP in Hinds County, Mississippi
- Gibbs House (Lockport, New York), listed on the NRHP in New York
- Gibbs House (Beaufort, North Carolina), listed on the NRHP in Carteret County, North Carolina
- Nicholas Gibbs House, Knoxville, Tennessee, listed on the NRHP in Knox County, Tennessee
- Gibbs-Flournoy House, Manning, Texas, listed on the NRHP in Angelina County, Texas
- Gibbs-Thomas House, Salt Lake City, Utah, listed on the NRHP in Salt Lake City, Utah
- Gibbs House (Seattle, Washington), a listed landmark in Seattle

== See also ==
- William Gibbs McAdoo House, Marietta, Georgia, USA
- John Gibbs House (disambiguation)
- Gibbes House (disambiguation)
- Gibbs (disambiguation)
