= Gibb (disambiguation) =

Gibb may refer to:

- Gibb, surname
- The Gibb, Grittleton, Wiltshire, England, UK; a hamlet
- Gibb River, Kimberley, Western Australia, Australia; a river
- Gibb River Road, Kimberley, Western Australia, Australia
- Gibb High School, Kumta, Karnataka, India

== See also ==
- Mr. Gibb (aka The Good Student), 2006 U.S. dark comedy film
- Robin Gibb (EP), 1985 EP by Robin Gibb
- James Gibb (disambiguation)
- John Gibb (disambiguation)
- Robert Gibb (disambiguation)
- Thomas Gibb (disambiguation)
- William Gibb (disambiguation)
- Gipp (surname)
- Gib (disambiguation)
- Gibbs (disambiguation)
- Gibbes (disambiguation)
