= Jib (disambiguation) =

Jib is a triangular sail at the front of a sailing boat.

Jib or JIB may also refer to:

== Mechanical ==
- Jib (crane) or jib arm, the horizontal or near-horizontal beam used in many types of crane
- Jib (camera), a boom device with a camera on one end
- Jib door, a concealed door, whose surface reflects the moldings and finishes of the wall

== Businesses and organizations ==
- Joint Intelligence Bureau, a former British intelligence agency
- Japan International Broadcasting Inc., a Japanese broadcasting organization
  - JIB TV, part of NHK General TV, a Japanese television company
- Jong Islamieten Bond, a former Indonesian youth organization
- Jordan Investment Board, now Jordan Investment Commission, the national investment promotion agency of Jordan

== Places ==
- Hajib, Iran, also known as Jīb, a village in Qazvin Province, Iran
- Al Jib or al-Jib (Arabic: الجيب), a Palestinian village in the Jerusalem Governorate
- Jib Tunnel, entrance to a cave system in North Yorkshire, England
- Djibouti–Ambouli International Airport, IATA code JIB
- 1596 name for Jubayb, Syria

== Other uses ==
- Jib, or Grind (sport), a term in winter sports
- Jejunoileal bypass, a surgical weight-loss procedure
- Pongpet Thongklet (born 1995), known as Jib, a Thai footballer
- Plateau United F.C., formerly JIB Strikers F.C., Nigerian football club
- Jib, the character from the board game Candy Land

== See also ==
- Gib (disambiguation)
- Gibb, a given name and surname
- Gibbs (disambiguation)
- JIBS (disambiguation)
- Jibbs (born 1990), Jovan Campbell, an American rapper
