= William Gibbs =

William Gibbs may refer to:

== People ==
- William Gibbs (Australian politician) (1879–1944), Australian Senator
- William Gibbs (businessman) (1790–1875), English businessman who developed Tyntesfield
- William Gibbs (New Zealand politician) (1817–1897), New Zealand MP
- William Gibbs (schoolboy) (1865–1877), British boy who committed suicide, causing a government inquiry
- William B. Gibbs Jr. (1905–1984), American educator and activist
- William C. Gibbs (1789–1871), Governor of Rhode Island from 1821 to 1824
- William D. Gibbs (1869–1944), president of what became the University of New Hampshire, USA
- William Edward Gibbs (1890–1934), British chemical engineer
- William Francis Gibbs (1886–1967), American naval architect
- William F. Gibbs (1895–1987), American businessman, politician, and farmer
- William Henry Gibbs (1823–1902), Canadian politician

== Other uses ==
- William Gibbs School for Girls, Faversham, Kent, England
- William Gibbs House, a historic house in Waltham, Massachusetts, USA

== See also ==
- Gibbs (surname)
- William Gibbs McAdoo, U.S. senator from California
  - William Gibbs McAdoo House, Marietta, Georgia, USA
- William Gibbes (disambiguation)
- William Gibb (disambiguation)
