= Gibbes (disambiguation) =

Gibbes may refer to:

== People ==
- Gibbes, a surname
- Gibbes baronets later Osborne-Gibbes baronets, titles in the Baronetage of Great Britain

== Places ==
- Mount Gibbes, of the Black Mountains, North Carolina, U.S.
- Gibbes, and Gibbes Bay, Saint Peter, Barbados

== Other uses ==
- Gibbes Museum of Art, Charleston, South Carolina, U.S.

== See also ==
- William Gibbes (disambiguation)
- Gibbs (disambiguation)
- Gibb (disambiguation)
- Gibbes House (disambiguation)
