= Gipps (disambiguation) =

Gipps may refer to:

- Gipps, a surname and list of people by that name
- Mount Gipps, Queensland, Australia
- Mount Gipps Station, New South Wales, Australia
- Mount Gipps railway station, New South Wales, Australia
- Gipps County, New South Wales, Australia
- Gipps Ice Rise, Larsen Ice Shelf, Antarctica

== See also ==
- Gipps' model
- GippsAero, Australian aircraft company
- Electoral district of Gipps' Land, Victoria, Australia
- Electoral district of Sydney-Gipps, New South Wales, Australia
- Old Gippstown, Moe, Victoria, Australia; a museum
- Gipp, a surname
- George Gipps (disambiguation)
- Gippsland (disambiguation)
- Gibbs (disambiguation)
- Gips (disambiguation)
