= Gibbes =

Gibbes is a surname. It may refer to:

- Bobby Gibbes (1916–2007), Australian fighter ace
- Charles Gibbes (1876–1963), British academic
- Frederick Gibbes (1839–1888), Australian politician
- George Smith Gibbes (1771–1851), British physician
- Heneage Gibbes (1837–1912), British pathologist
- John Gibbes (Carolina) (1696–1794), English colonial officer in colony of the Province of Carolina
- John George Nathaniel Gibbes (1787–1873), Collector of Customs for the Colony of New South Wales
- Phebe Gibbes (died 1805) British novelist
- Sir Philip Gibbes, 1st Baronet (1731–1815), planter on Barbados
- Robert Gibbes (1644–1715), a colonial governor of Carolina
- Samuel Osborne-Gibbes (1803–1874), Second Baronet, British Army officer, Freemason, plantation owner and politician
- Sydney Gibbes (1876–1963), British academic
- William Gibbes (disambiguation), multiple people
- Wilmot Gibbes de Saussure (1822–1886) South Carolinian militia officer

== See also ==
- Osborne-Gibbes baronets (originally Gibbes baronetcy), of the British peerage
- Gibbs (surname)
- Gibb (surname)
