= GIBS =

GIBS may refer to:

- General Inspection of Security Forces, Czech law enforcement which controls officers of armed forces
- The Gordon Institute of Business Science, University of Pretoria, a business school in Johannesburg, South Africa
- The Graz International Bilingual School
- Gib (video gaming), a term in first person shooter games for bits of a character left after a kill

== See also ==
- Jib
- Gibbs (disambiguation)
- Gib (disambiguation)
