= Joe Gibbs (disambiguation) =

Joe Gibbs (born 1940) is an American auto racing team owner and former football coach.

Joe Gibbs may also refer to:

- Joe Gibbs (cricketer) (1946–2011), Grenadian cricketer
- Joe Gibbs (producer) (1942–2008), Jamaican reggae producer
- Joey Gibbs (born 1992), Australian soccer player

== See also ==
- Joseph Gibbs (disambiguation)
- Jo Gibb, Scottish theatre actress
