= Gibbes House =

Gibbes House may refer to:

- Robert Gibbes House, Charleston, South Carolina, USA
- William Gibbes House, Charleston, South Carolina, USA

== See also ==
- House (disambiguation)
- Gibbes (disambiguation)
- Gibbs House (disambiguation)
