= George Gipps (disambiguation) =

George Gipps (1791–1847) was the governor of New South Wales.

George Gipps may also refer to:

- George Gipps (MP for Canterbury) (c. 1728–1800), English apothecary, hop merchant, banker and politician
- George Gipps (MP for Ripon) (1783–1869), Member of Parliament (MP) for Ripon, son of above

== See also ==
- George Gipp, "The Gipper" (1895–1920), American football player for Notre Dame
- Gipps, surname
