= Gipper (disambiguation) =

"The Gipper" is the nickname of George Gipp (1895–1920), an American football player.

Gipper may also refer to:

== People ==
- Ronald Reagan (1911–2004) nicknamed "The Gipper", President of the U.S.
- Gipper "El Animal" Nieto, Jr., member of Kumbia All Starz music group
- Gipper Finau, competitor on the golfing reality TV show The Big Break

== Other uses ==
- Mr. Gipper, a fictional dolphin from the 1963 film Flipper
- Gipper, a fictional engine in Disney animation TaleSpin
- USS Ronald Reagan (CVN-76), nicknamed Gipper, a U.S. Navy aircraft carrier

== See also ==
- GIP (disambiguation)
- Gipp, a surname
