= John Gibbs House =

John Gibbs House may refer to:

- John Gibbs House (Pilotview, Kentucky), listed on the NRHP in Clark County, Kentucky
- John Gibbs House (Kalamazoo, Michigan), NRHP-ID 83000858
- John Gibbs House (Johnsonburg, New Jersey), contributing property, listed on the NRHP in Warren County, New Jersey

== See also ==
- Gibbs House (disambiguation)
- John Gibbs (disambiguation)
