= John Gibbs =

John Gibbs may refer to:

- John Gibbs (architect), English architect
- John Gibbs (basketball) (1915–1982), American professional basketball player
- John Gibbs (bishop) (1917–2007), Anglican bishop of Coventry
- John Gibbs (British politician) for Hereford
- John Gibbs (rugby league) (born 1956), Australian rugby league footballer turned radio broadcaster
- John Gibbs (US government official), American commentator and federal government official
- John Gibbs (Virginia politician) (died 1622), American settler from England
- John L. Gibbs (1838–1908), Lt. Governor of Minnesota
- John Dixon Gibbs (1834–1912), British engineer and financier
- John Gibbs (died 1875), orchestra leader, Royal Victoria Theatre, Sydney

== See also ==
- Gibbs (surname)
- John Gibbs Gilbert (1810–1889), real name John Gibbs, comedian
- John Gibbes
- John Gibbs House (disambiguation)
- Jonathan Gibbs (disambiguation)
- John Gibb (disambiguation)
- John (disambiguation)
- Gibbs (disambiguation)
