= Ibbs =

Ibbs is a surname. Notable people with the surname include:

- Robert Leigh Ibbs, co-founder of Ibbs and Tillett
- Robin Ibbs (1926–2014), British businessman, government advisor, and Royal Navy officer
- Aiden Ibbs

== See also ==
- Gibbs (surname)
