= John Gibb =

John Gibb may refer to:

- John Gibb (courtier) (c. 1550–1628), Scottish courtier
- 'Meikle' John Gibb (died c. 1720), Scottish religious zealot and founder of the Sweet Singers or Gibbite sect
- John Gibb (businessman) (1829–1905), cofounder of Mills & Gibb
- John Gibb (engineer) (1776–1850), Scottish civil engineer and contractor
- John Gibb (painter) (1831–1909), Scottish marine painter
- John Gibb Thom, British soldier, judge and politician

== See also ==
- Gibb (surname)
- John Gibbes
- John Gibbs (disambiguation)
- John (disambiguation)
- Gibb (disambiguation)
