= National Register of Historic Places listings in Cobb County, Georgia =

Map of Georgia with Cobb County highlighted

This is a list of properties and districts in Cobb County, Georgia that are listed on the National Register of Historic Places (NRHP).

This National Park Service list is complete through NPS recent listings posted September 4, 2026.

== Current listings ==
	Name on the Register	Image	Date listed	Location	City or town	Description
1	Acworth Downtown Historic District	Acworth Downtown Historic District	April 19, 2006 (#06000286)	Roughly bounded by Southside Dr., Federal and Lemon Sts, and Senator Richard B. Russell Ave. 34°03′58″N 84°40′44″W	Acworth	
2	Atlanta-Frasier Street Historic District	Atlanta-Frasier Street Historic District	June 20, 1995 (#95000737)	Atlanta and Frasier Sts. between GA 120 Loop and Dixie Ave. 33°56′43″N 84°32′47″W	Marietta	
3	J. C. Bankston Rock House		November 25, 1994 (#94001387)	901 Industrial Dr., Dobbins Air Reserve Base; 33°55′30″N 84°31′36″W	Marietta	
4	Bethel AME Church	Bethel AME Church	May 9, 2002 (#02000453)	4683 Bell St. 34°04′07″N 84°40′41″W	Acworth	
5	Big Shanty Village Historic District	Big Shanty Village Historic District	March 20, 1980 (#80000995)	Park Ave., Whitfield Pl., Main, Harris, Lewis, and Cherokee Sts. 34°01′27″N 84°36′54″W	Kennesaw	
6	Braswell-Carnes House	Braswell-Carnes House	March 1, 1984 (#84000974)	2430 Burnt Hickory Rd., NW; 33°57′57″N 84°37′21″W	Marietta	
7	Arnoldus Brumby House	Arnoldus Brumby House	August 29, 1977 (#77000417)	472 Powder Springs St. 33°56′37″N 84°33′08″W	Marietta	
8	Hiram Butler House	Hiram Butler House	February 2, 1995 (#94001637)	2382 Pine Mountain Rd., NW. 34°00′35″N 84°37′47″W	Kennesaw	
9	Butner-Mctyre General Store	Butner-Mctyre General Store	February 1, 2006 (#05001593)	4455 Marietta St. 33°51′32″N 84°41′04″W	Powder Springs	
10	Camp McDonald	Camp McDonald	March 20, 1980 (#80000996)	Off U.S. 41; 34°01′18″N 84°37′05″W	Kennesaw	
11	J. H. Carmichael Farm and General Store		June 30, 1980 (#80001002)	SE of Smyrna at 501 Log Cabin Rd. 33°50′36″N 84°29′02″W	Smyrna	
12	Israel Causey House	Israel Causey House	August 13, 1975 (#75000584)	5909 Maxham Rd. 33°48′36″N 84°37′05″W	Austell	
13	Andrew J. Cheney House	Andrew J. Cheney House	July 22, 1979 (#79000713)	SW of Marietta at Powder Springs and Bankstone Rds. 33°53′07″N 84°37′07″W	Marietta	
14	Cherokee Street Historic District	Cherokee Street Historic District	March 20, 1980 (#80000997)	Cherokee St. 34°01′34″N 84°36′36″W	Kennesaw	
15	Church Street-Cherokee Street Historic District		December 3, 1985 (#85003059)	Roughly bounded by Margaret Ave. and Chicopee Dr., DeSoto Ave., Montgomery and Brumby, and Campbell Hill Sts. 33°57′44″N 84°32′53″W	Marietta	
16	Clarkdale Historic District	Clarkdale Historic District	December 23, 1987 (#87002134)	Powder Springs-Austell Rd. 33°49′48″N 84°39′15″W	Clarkdale	
17	Collins Avenue Historic District	Collins Avenue Historic District	July 5, 2001 (#01000707)	Collins Ave. 34°04′00″N 84°41′10″W	Acworth	
18	Stephen D. Cowan House	Stephen D. Cowan House	November 15, 2002 (#02001299)	4940 Cowan Rd. 34°04′24″N 84°39′18″W	Acworth	
19	Frobel-Knight-Borders House		July 21, 1995 (#95000901)	1001 Allgood Rd. 33°58′31″N 84°31′25″W	Marietta	
20	The General	The General	June 19, 1973 (#73000617)	Big Shanty Museum of Cherokee St. 34°01′25″N 84°36′52″W	Kennesaw	Subject of the Great Locomotive Chase of the American Civil War, located at Southern Museum of Civil War and Locomotive History
21	Gilgal Church Battle Site	Gilgal Church Battle Site	January 23, 1975 (#75000585)	9 mi (14 km) W of Marietta on Sandtown Rd. 33°58′18″N 84°39′54″W	Marietta	
22	Glover-McLeod-Garrison House	Glover-McLeod-Garrison House	March 25, 1977 (#77000418)	250 Garrison Rd., SE (that part of the street is called Magnolia Chase Dr as of 2017); 33°56′07″N 84°32′52″W	Marietta	
23	Johnston's River Line		July 5, 1973 (#73000618)	SE of Mableton off U.S. 78 at Chattachooche River; 33°47′31″N 84°31′23″W	Mableton	Boundary increase May 18, 2015.
24	Kennesaw Mountain National Battlefield Park	Kennesaw Mountain National Battlefield Park	October 15, 1966 (#66000063)	2 mi (3.2 km) W of Marietta; 33°56′59″N 84°35′37″W	Marietta	administered by the National Park Service
25	Lake Acworth Beach and Bathhouse	Lake Acworth Beach and Bathhouse	January 7, 2010 (#09001202)	Lakeshore Dr. 34°03′39″N 84°40′56″W	Acworth	
26	Lemon Street School	Lemon Street School	February 23, 2024 (#100009980)	350 Lemon Street; 33°57′19″N 84°32′31″W	Marietta	
27	Robert Mable House and Cemetery	Robert Mable House and Cemetery	September 1, 1988 (#87001345)	5239 Floyd Rd. 33°49′37″N 84°34′25″W	Mableton	
28	Marietta National Cemetery	Marietta National Cemetery	September 18, 1998 (#98001170)	500 Washington Ave. 33°57′04″N 84°32′27″W	Marietta	
29	William Gibbs McAdoo House	William Gibbs McAdoo House	November 17, 1978 (#78000975)	SW of Marietta on GA 5; 33°54′28″N 84°36′15″W	Marietta	
30	Midway Presbyterian Church and Cemetery	Midway Presbyterian Church and Cemetery	December 29, 1986 (#86003526)	4635 Dallas Hwy./GA 120 SW; 33°56′37″N 84°41′15″W	Powder Springs	
31	Tarleton Moore House	Tarleton Moore House	May 31, 2006 (#06000453)	4784 Northside Dr. 34°04′12″N 84°41′12″W	Acworth	
32	North Main Street Historic District	North Main Street Historic District	March 20, 1980 (#80000999)	N. Main St. 34°01′33″N 84°37′14″W	Kennesaw	
33	Northwest Marietta Historic District	Northwest Marietta Historic District	June 11, 1975 (#75000586)	Roughly bounded by RR tracks, NW along Kennesaw Ave., McDonald St., and Whitlock Ave. 33°57′36″N 84°33′22″W	Marietta	
34	Solomon and Penelopy Pace House	Solomon and Penelopy Pace House	May 20, 2009 (#09000325)	3057 Paces Mill Rd. 33°52′01″N 84°27′53″W	Vinings	
35	George A. Power House	George A. Power House	July 11, 2001 (#01000720)	Hyde Rd. 33°57′38″N 84°23′42″W	Marietta	
36	Power-Hyde Farm Historic District	Power-Hyde Farm Historic District	August 28, 2024 (#100010808)	575 Hyde Road; 33°57′55″N 84°23′27″W	Marietta	
37	John W. Rice Summer Cottage	John W. Rice Summer Cottage	April 8, 1983 (#83000189)	254 Concord Rd. 33°50′59″N 84°33′33″W	Smyrna	
38	Riverview Carousel at Six Flags Over Georgia	Riverview Carousel at Six Flags Over Georgia	January 27, 1995 (#94001639)	7561 Six Flags Pkwy. 33°46′00″N 84°33′03″W	Austell	A carousel at Six Flags Over Georgia
39	William and Hannah Root House	William and Hannah Root House	March 12, 2014 (#14000061)	145 Denmead St., NW. 33°57′16″N 84°33′07″W	Marietta	In the Northwest Marietta Historic District
40	Ruff's Mill and Concord Covered Bridge	Ruff's Mill and Concord Covered Bridge	November 24, 1980 (#80001001)	10 Concord Rd., SW; 33°50′56″N 84°33′30″W	Smyrna	
41	Smith-Manning House	Smith-Manning House	December 2, 2014 (#14000969)	360 Manning Rd. 33°56′38″N 84°34′56″W	Marietta	
42	Sope Creek Ruins	Sope Creek Ruins	April 27, 1973 (#73000619)	Address Restricted (at the intersection of Paper Mill Road and Sope Creek); 33°56′26″N 84°26′16″W	Marietta	
43	Summers Street Historic District	Summers Street Historic District	March 20, 1980 (#80001000)	Summers St. 34°01′10″N 84°36′49″W	Kennesaw	
44	Taylor-Brawner House and Brawner Sanitarium	Taylor-Brawner House and Brawner Sanitarium	March 27, 2012 (#12000149)	3180 Atlanta Rd; 33°52′32″N 84°30′24″W	Smyrna	website
45	Union Field Fortifications at Henderson Road	Union Field Fortifications at Henderson Road	May 18, 2015 (#15000223)	6000 Henderson Rd., SE. 33°48′24″N 84°31′21″W	Mableton vicinity	
46	Washington Avenue Historic District		August 10, 1989 (#89001102)	Roughly bounded by Lawrence St., Rigsby St., Washington Ave., and Haynes St. 33°57′09″N 84°32′36″W	Marietta	
47	Whitlock Avenue Historic District		September 14, 1989 (#89001218)	Roughly bounded by McCord St., Oakmont St., Whitlock Ave., Powder Springs Rd., Trammel St., Maxwell Ave., and Hazel St. 33°57′04″N 84°33′26″W	Marietta	
48	Zion Baptist Church	Zion Baptist Church	July 11, 1990 (#90001026)	149 Haynes St. 33°57′18″N 84°32′51″W	Marietta	

== Former listing ==
	Name on the Register	Image	Date listed	Date removed	Location	City or town	Description
1	John S. Gibson Farmhouse		March 20, 1980 (#80000998)	October 28, 2009	3370 Cherokee St. 34°02′07″N 84°36′18″W	Kennesaw	
