= Arnoldus Brumby House =

- U.S. National Register of Historic Places
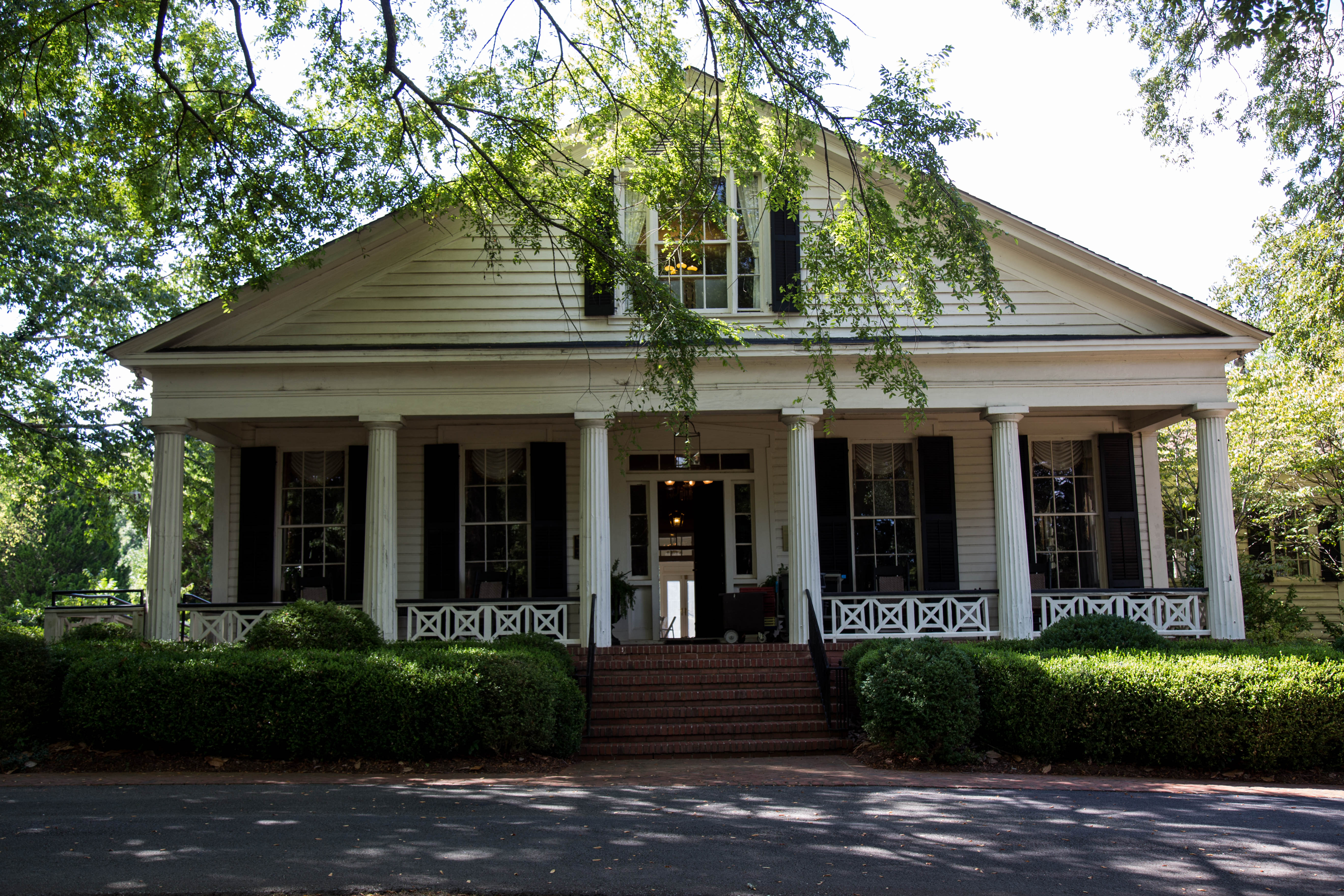

- Location within Georgia
- Location: 472 Powder Springs Street, Marietta, Georgia
- Coordinates: 33°56′37″N 84°33′08″W
- Area: 6 acres (2.4 ha)
- Built: 1851
- Architectural style: Greek Revival
- NRHP reference No.: 77000417
- Added to NRHP: August 29, 1977

The Arnoldus Brumby House is a historic house in Marietta, Georgia, United States known as Brumby Hall. It was built in the Antebellum Era (1851) for a West Point graduate and Confederate colonel. It is listed on the National Register of Historic Places.

== History ==
The house was built in 1851 for Colonel Arnoldus Brumby, a white, male graduate of the United States Military Academy in West Point, New York. During the American Civil War of 1861–1865, Brumby served as a colonel in the Confederate States Army (CSA). The house was subsequently purchased by Ellan M. Bradley.

== Architectural significance ==
The house was designed in the Greek Revival architectural style, with Egyptian Revival features. It has been listed on the National Register of Historic Places since August 29, 1977.
