= Braswell-Carnes House =

- U.S. National Register of Historic Places
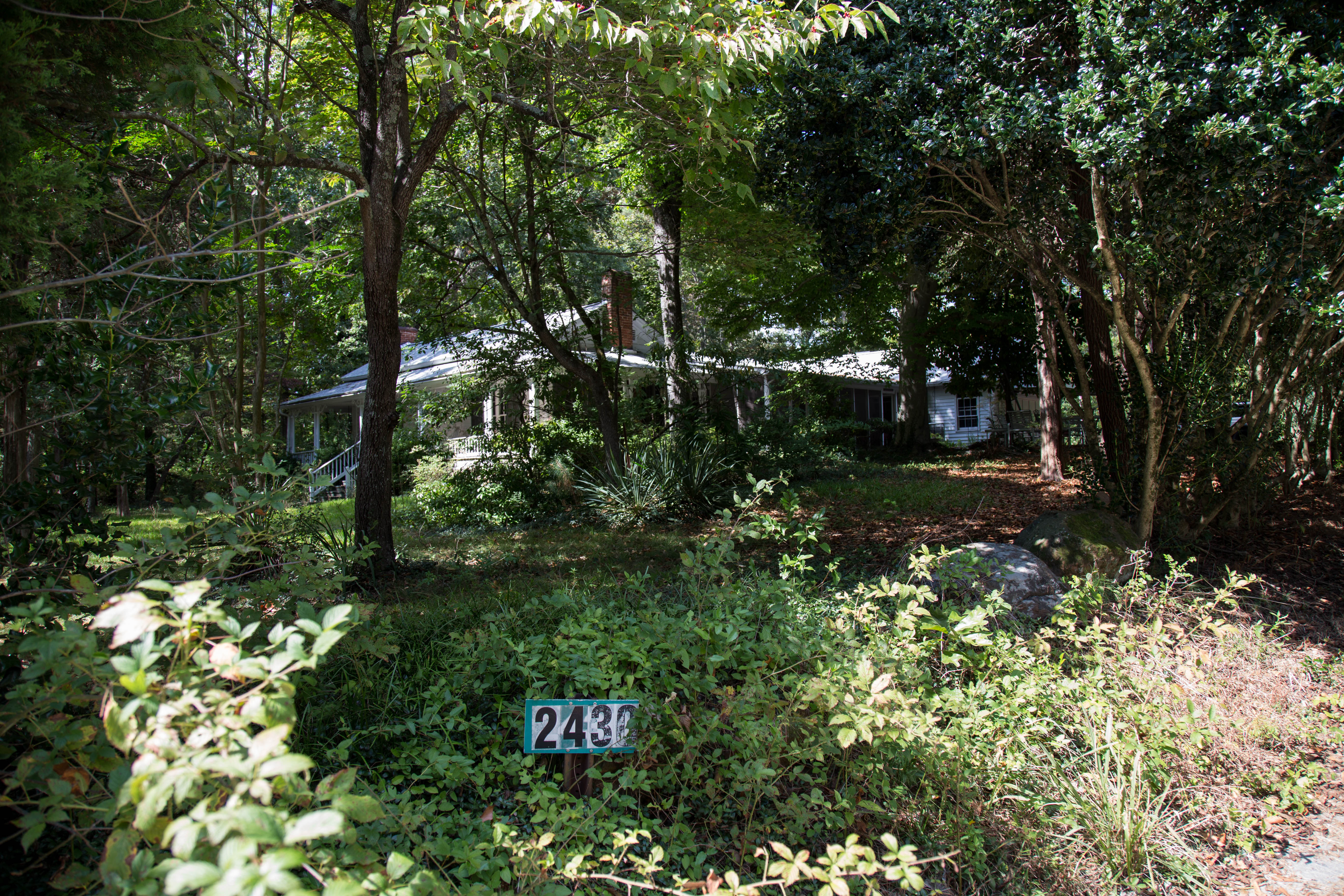

- Location within Georgia
- Location: 2430 Burnt Hickory Road, NW, Marietta, Georgia
- Coordinates: 33.96586°N 84.62263°W
- Area: 13 acres (5.3 ha)
- Built: 1865-1866
- Architectural style: Georgian
- NRHP reference No.: 84000974
- Added to NRHP: March 1, 1984

The Braswell-Carnes House is a historic house in Marietta, Georgia, U.S.. It was built shortly after the American Civil War for a Confederate veteran. It is listed on the National Register of Historic Places.

== History ==
The house was built in 1865-1866 for Ephraim Braswell and his wife, née Martha Ann Eugenia Wallis. The land was given to the couple as a wedding gift by the bride's father, Josiah Wallis, in 1861. However, the construction of the house was delayed by the American Civil War of 1861–1865. Braswell served in the Confederate States Army (CSA) during the war, and returned to civilian life in 1865.

The house was purchased by James Davis Carnes, a farmer, in 1893. It still belonged to his descendants in the 1980s.

== Architectural significance ==
The house was designed in the Georgian architectural style. It has been listed on the National Register of Historic Places since March 1, 1984.
