= Joseph Gibbs =

Joseph Gibbs may refer to:

- Joseph Gibbs (composer) (1699–1788), English composer
- Joseph Gibbs (cricketer) (1867–1899), English cricketer
- Joseph Gibbs (engineer) (1798–1864), British civil engineer and mechanical inventor
- Joseph Gibbs (artist), British portrait painter

== See also ==
- Joe Gibbs (disambiguation)
