= Robert Mable House and Cemetery =

Historic house in Georgia, United States

- U.S. National Register of Historic Places
- U.S. Historic district
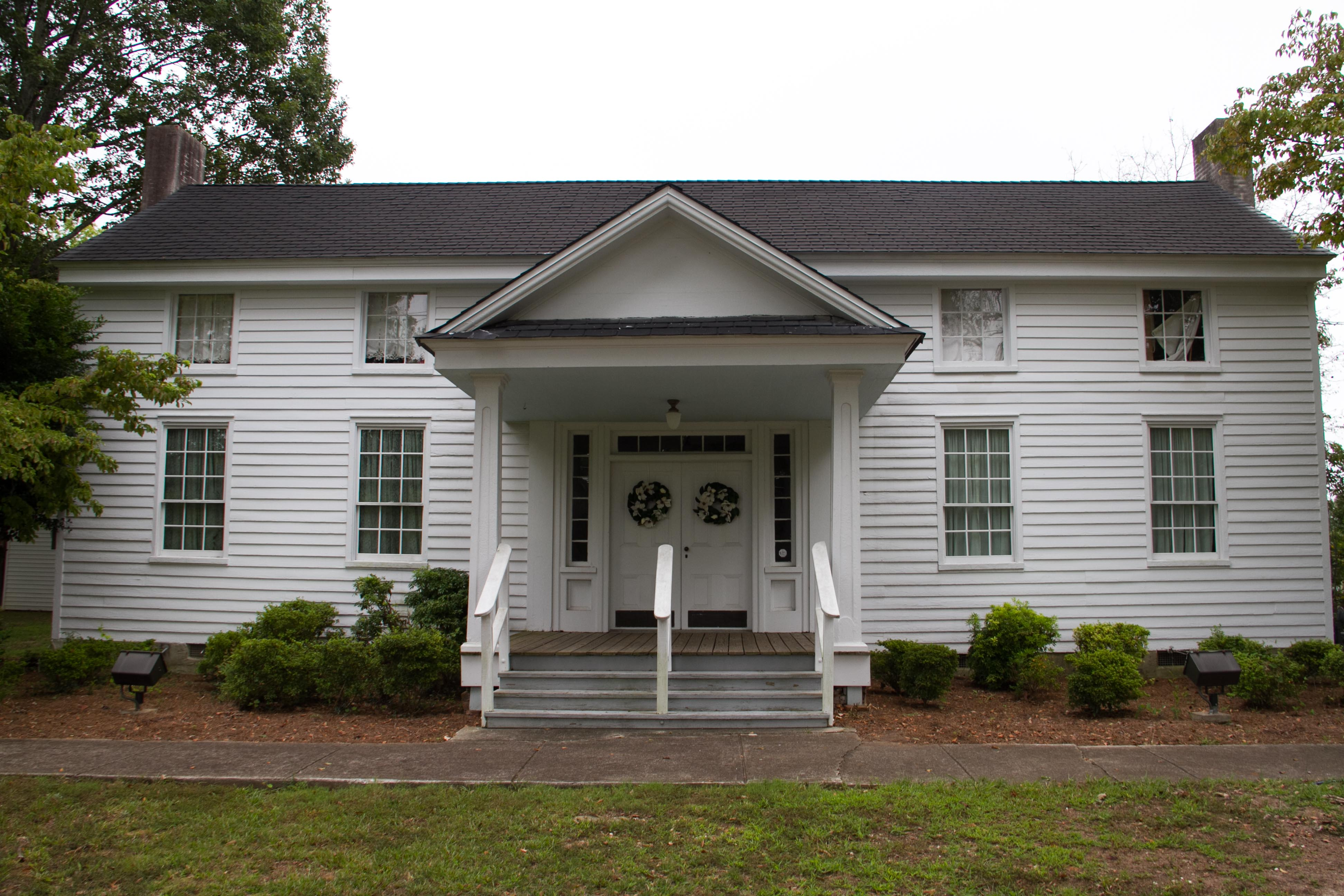

- Location within Metro Atlanta Location within Georgia Location within the United States
- Location: 5239 Floyd Rd., Mableton, Georgia
- Coordinates: 33°49′37″N 84°34′25″W
- Area: 16 acres (6.5 ha)
- Built: 1843
- Built by: Mable, Robert
- Architectural style: Plantation Plain
- NRHP reference No.: 87001345
- Added to NRHP: September 1, 1988

The Robert Mable House and Cemetery is a historic residential building in Mableton, Georgia, now used as the Mable House Arts Center. The plantation plain house was constructed by Robert Mable (1803–1885), an immigrant from Scotland who lived in Savannah, Georgia before buying the 300 acres (120 ha) property in Cobb County, Georgia from the Georgia Gold Land Lottery of 1832. He lived in a log cabin before building a sawmill and constructing the home ca. 1843.

The home is operated by the Cobb County Parks, Recreation and Cultural Affairs Department. It is the site of a fall storytelling festival, and is used for school field trips and summer heritage camps. Public tours are offered from June until September. It was added to the National Register of Historic Places on September 1, 1988. It is located at 5239 Floyd Road.

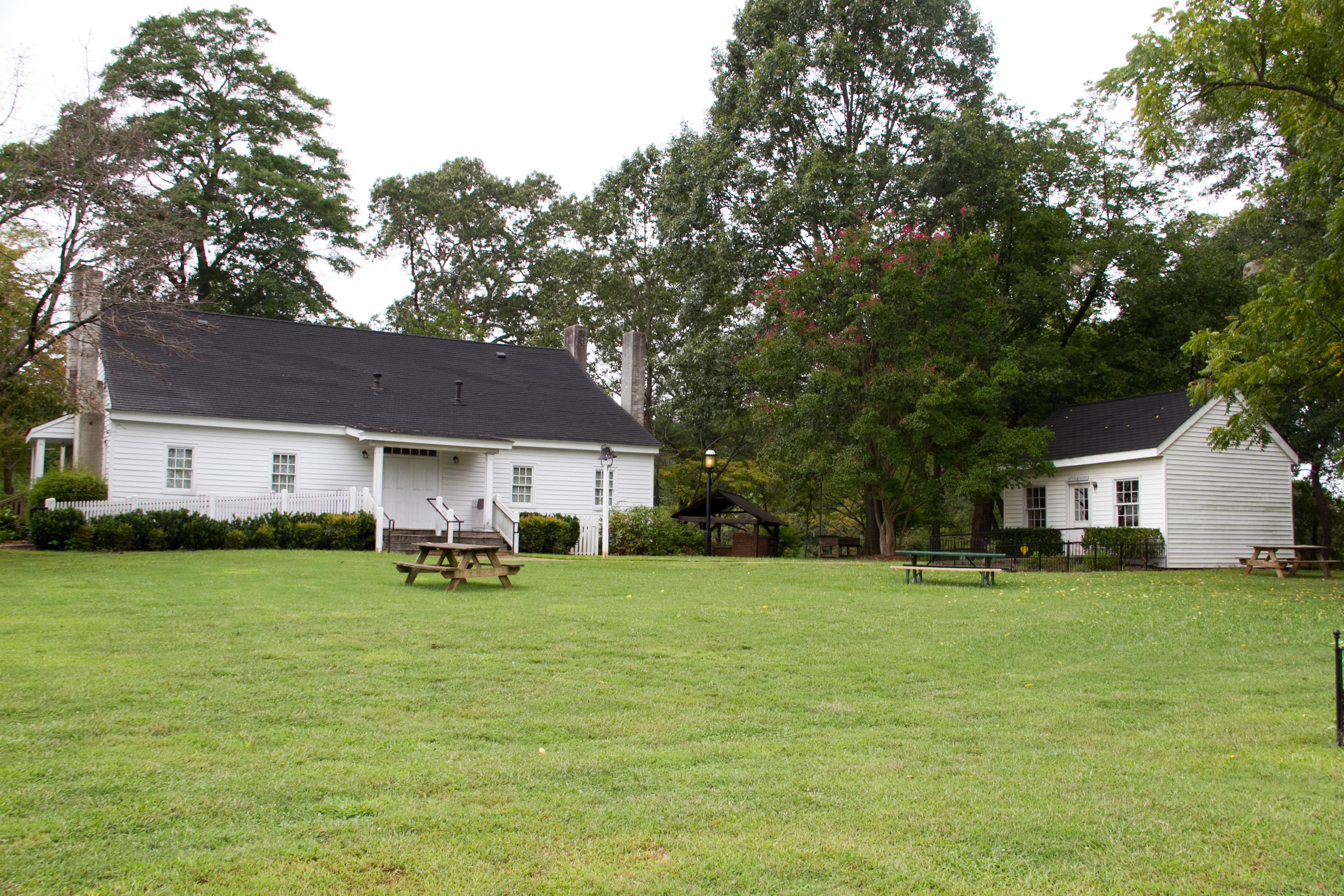
View of the house from its backyard

== See also ==
- National Register of Historic Places listings in Cobb County, Georgia
