= Andrew J. Cheney House =

Historic house in the U.S.

- U.S. National Register of Historic Places
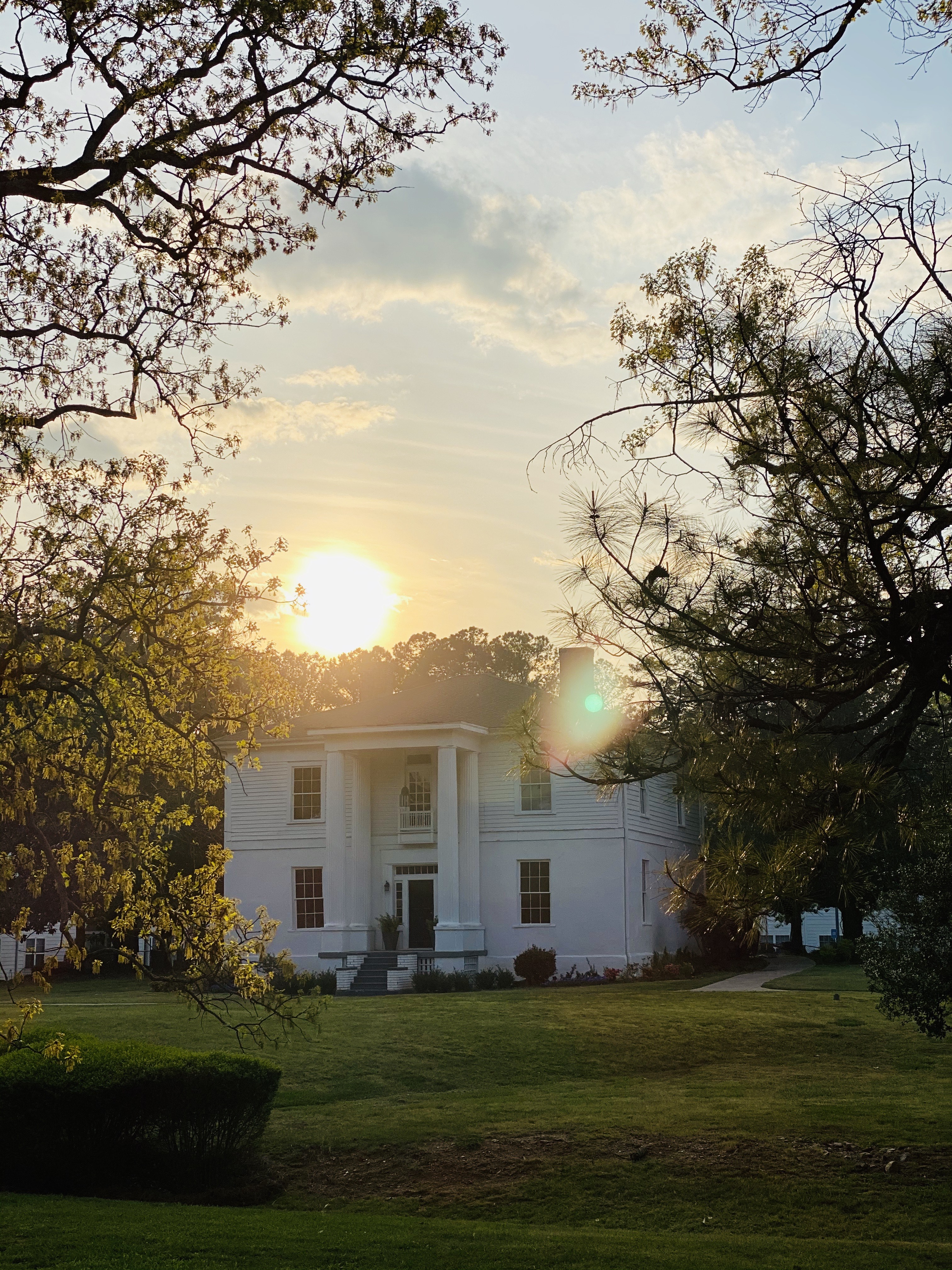
- Taken April 5, 2020

- Location within Georgia
- Location: 2790 Bankstone Dr SW, Marietta, Georgia
- Nearest city: Marietta, Georgia
- Coordinates: 33.88524°N 84.61854°W
- Area: 9.2 acres (3.7 ha)
- Built: 1857
- Architectural style: Greek Revival
- NRHP reference No.: 79000713
- Added to NRHP: July 22, 1979

The Andrew J. Cheney House is a historic house on a former plantation in Marietta, Georgia, U.S.. Built in the Antebellum Era, it was used by Union General William Tecumseh Sherman during the American Civil War, and it was the private residence of a state representative after the war. It is listed on the National Register of Historic Places.

== History ==
The house was built in 1856 for Andrew Jackson Cheney, a planter and slaveholder, who lived here with his wife, née Lucy Swift. During the American Civil War of 1861–1865, the house was occupied by the Union Army. Specifically, General William Tecumseh Sherman was stationed in the house on June 23–25, 1864.

After the war, Cheney hired freedmen as sharecroppers on his plantation. His first wife died, and he married Nancy Hammack. Their son, John Percival Cheney, who served as a member of the Georgia House of Representatives, inherited the house. It was purchased by John E. Mozley in the 1930s, followed by Kenneth Newcomer in the 1950s. As of October 2016, it is occupied by the current owner.

== Architectural significance ==
The house was designed in the Greek Revival architectural style. It has been listed on the National Register of Historic Places since July 22, 1979.
