= Zion Baptist Church (Marietta, Georgia) =

Historic church in Georgia, United States

- Old Zion Baptist Church
- Zion Baptist Church
- Location: 149 Haynes Street NE; Marietta, Georgia 30060
- Country: United States
- Denomination: Baptist
- Website: www.zbcmarietta.org

History
- Founded: April 8, 1866
- Zion Baptist Church
- U.S. National Register of Historic Places
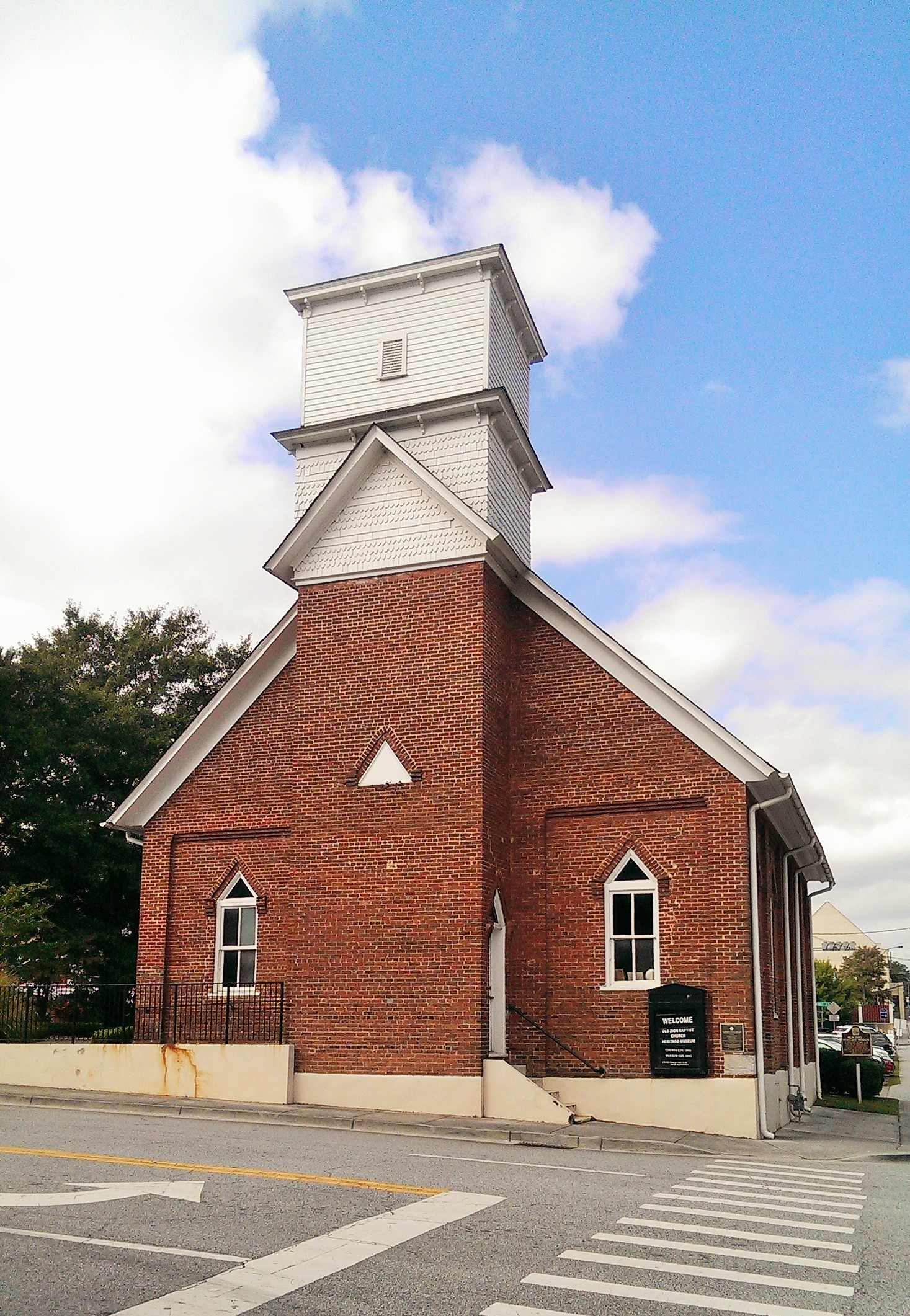
- Zion Baptist Church (2014)
- Coordinates: 33°57′18.68″N 84°32′50.10″W
- Area: less than one acre
- Built: 1888
- Architectural style: Gothic Revival
- NRHP reference No.: 90001026
- Added to NRHP: July 11, 1990

The Zion Baptist Church in Marietta, Georgia is a Baptist church which was founded in 1866 by African American members of another Baptist church in the city. The current building, built in 1888, was added to the National Register of Historic Places in 1990.

== History ==
In 1865, African American members of First Baptist Church in Marietta, Georgia (many of whom had been slaves prior to the Civil War) petitioned the church for dismissal in order to form a black church under their own administration. This dismissal was granted the following year and Zion Baptist Church was officially founded on April 8, 1866, with Reverend Ephraim Rucker as the church's first pastor. The 88 original members of this congregation constructed a wooden church house on land donated by First Baptist. In 1888, this building was converted to a brick church building. This building would serve as the congregation's meeting house until 1978, when a new building was constructed across the street from this structure. As membership continued to grow, another building was constructed by the church in 2007. The 1888 building was added to the National Register of Historic Places on July 11, 1990. Today, tours are given of the restored building, which occasionally hosts weddings.

== See also ==
- National Register of Historic Places listings in Cobb County, Georgia

The church invites all people from any background to join them.

== Bibliography ==
- Glover V, James Bolan; McTyre, Joe; Paden, Rebecca Nash (1999). Marietta, 1833-2000. Arcadia Publishing. ISBN 978-0-7385-0322-6 – via Google Books.
- Kirby, Joe; Guarnieri, Damien A. (2007). Marietta. Arcadia Publishing. ISBN 978-0-7385-5314-6 – via Google Books.
- Lassiter, Patrice Shelton (1999). Generations of Black Life in Kennesaw and Marietta. Arcadia Publishing. ISBN 978-0-7524-1399-0 – via Google Books.
- Savage, Beth L., ed. (1994). African American Historic Places. John Wiley & Sons. ISBN 978-0-471-14345-1 – via Google Books.
