= JIBS =

JIBS may stand for:

- Journal of International Business Studies
- Jonkoping International Business School, Sweden
- Jeju Free International City Broadcasting System, or JIBS, a South Korean radio and TV station

== See also ==
- Jib (disambiguation)
