= Gibbs =

Gibbs or GIBBS is a surname and acronym. It may refer to:

== People ==
- Gibbs (surname)

== Places ==
- Gibbs (crater), on the Moon
- Gibbs, Idaho, US
- Gibbs, Missouri, US
- Gibbs, Tennessee, US
- Gibbs Island (South Shetland Islands), Antarctica
- 2937 Gibbs, an asteroid
- Mount Gibbs

== Science ==
=== Mathematics and statistics ===
- Gibbs phenomenon
- Gibbs' inequality
- Gibbs sampling

=== Physics ===
- Gibbs phase rule
- Gibbs free energy
- Gibbs entropy
- Gibbs paradox
- Gibbs–Helmholtz equation
- Gibbs algorithm
- Gibbs state
- Gibbs-Marangoni effect
- Gibbs phenomenon, an MRI artifact

== Organisations ==
- Gibbs & Cox naval architecture firm
- Gothenburg International Bioscience Business School
- Gibbs College, several US locations
- Gibbs Technologies, developer and manufacturer of amphibious vehicles
- Gibbs High School (disambiguation), several schools of this name exist
- Antony Gibbs & Sons, British trading company, established in London in 1802

== Other uses ==
- Gibbs SR, former name of the toothpaste Mentadent
- Gibbs Stadium, Spartanburg, South Carolina, US

== See also ==
- Gibbs' Reflective Cycle
- List of things named after Josiah W. Gibbs
- Gibbes (disambiguation)
- Gibb (disambiguation)
- Gib (disambiguation)
- Gipps (disambiguation)
