= Sope Creek Ruins =

- U.S. National Register of Historic Places
- U.S. Historic district
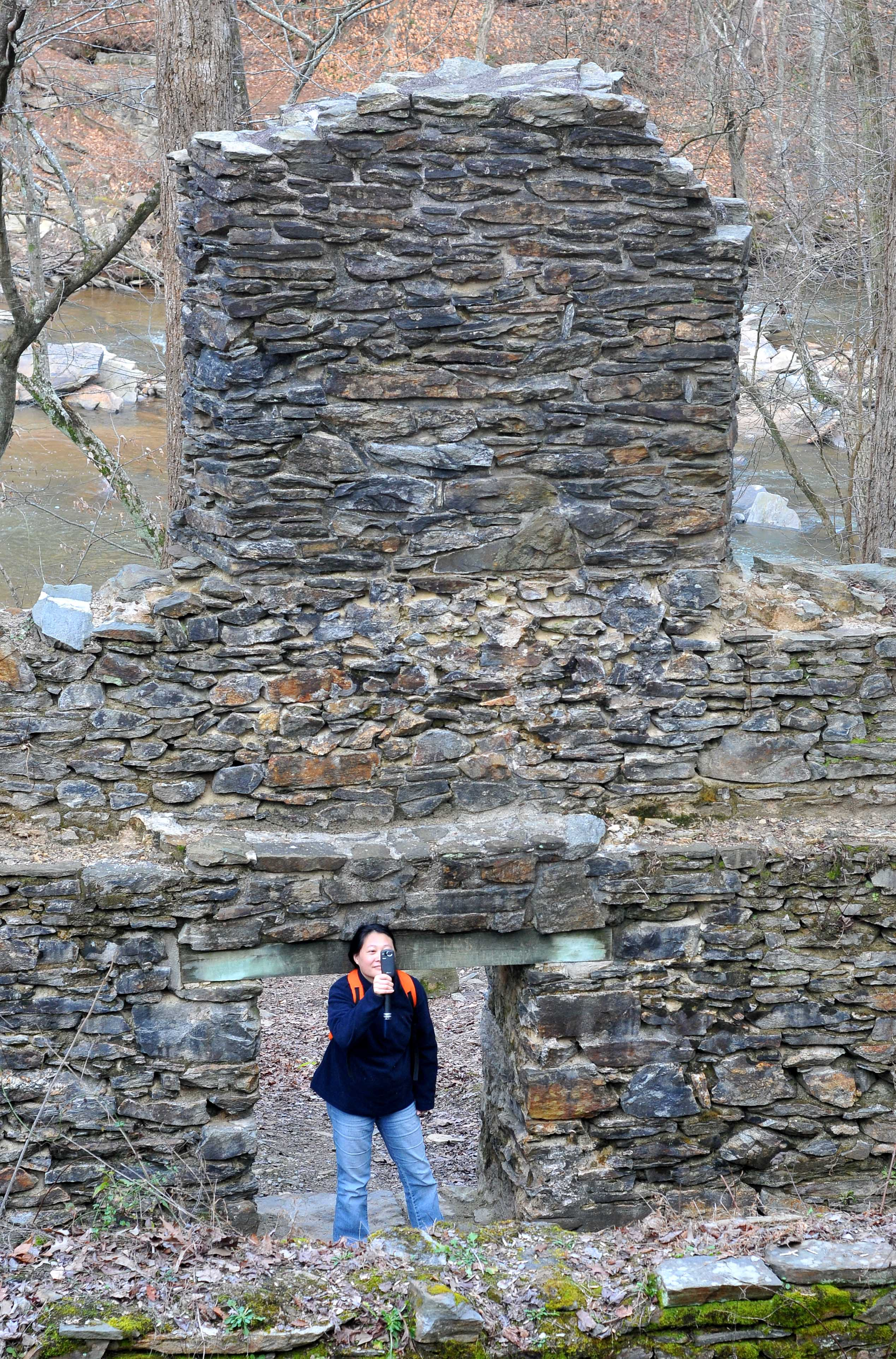
- Sope Creek Ruins (2012)

- Location within Metro Atlanta Location within Georgia Location within the United States
- Nearest city: Marietta, Georgia
- Coordinates: 33°56′26″N 84°26′16″W
- Area: 182 acres (74 ha)
- NRHP reference No.: 73000619
- Added to NRHP: April 27, 1973

Sope Creek Ruins are located at the intersection of Paper Mill Road and Sope Creek in Cobb County, Georgia and are old industrial ruins. These ruins are the remnants of a larger manufacturing complex which drew on the waterpower that the creek produced. During the period 1850 to 1940, a succession of enterprises, from a (fully integrated) paper mill, twine plant, flour mill and hydroelectric power plant occupied an area of about one mile along the creek.

The paper mill at Sope Creek was run by Marietta Paper Mills and incorporated on December 19, 1859, possibly by Andrew Schofield Edmondston and Saxon A. Anderson. Facilities at the paper mill included a mill, oil room, office, mill sluice (raceway), storeroom, dam, machine shop, pulp-grinding mill, and two shelters.

The site was added to the National Register of Historic Places (National Register of Historic Places listings in Cobb County, Georgia) on April 27, 1973, with its address listed as restricted.

== Civil War production constraints ==
The Daily Intelligencer of Atlanta printed a letter dated September 10, 1863, from Mr. A.S. Edmonston [sic]. In it, Mr. Edmondston pleads with the Intelligencer, letting them know that while they are the newspaper's main source of paper, they can only send them so much due to war constraints. Edmondston writes:

I have on hand a few bundles of paper, which I will ship you, and this will be the last for some time; for when we shall resume again I cannot tell. My hands volunteered in the Home Guard, to protect the country against raids, and are now called out to guard stores and prepare the defences [sic] of your city, I understand. In the first instance, at the commencement of the war, I was disposed to aid all in my power and encouraged two of the hands to volunteer in Confederate service. This left hardly hands enough to get along with when all were well. Afterwards we lost two or three hands, and this left us short of hands, and one machine has only run when our hands have worked eighteen hours in the day.--We applied for the detail of the hands which has not been done, though the Government has been urgent for paper, and we have strained every nerve to supply. Shorthanded, we have done the best we could, and now all our hands are taken, of course we are obliged to stop.

Edmondston goes on to complain about the fact that while the Confederate government demands paper, he is shorthanded because paper workers were not considered vital to the war effort. Edmondston stated: "You know Paper makers are not to be had South, and are not like Shoe-Makers, and many other callings which give exemptions to so many thousands, and cannot be learned after the Conscript officer takes after a fellow."

The paper supply became even harder to come by when on July 5, 1864, Union soldiers under the command of General Gerrard burned the Marietta Paper Mill, along with Denmead's Flour Mill. The paper mill was rebuilt in 1865, only to burn again in 1870 and be rebuilt in 1871. The mill struggled to survive the years immediately following the second rebuilding. The mills were sold at a public sale in 1873 and restructured as the Marietta Paper Manufacturing Company. In 1888 and 1889, a wood pulp mill and a twine factory were added to the site, respectively. Finally, in 1902, production at that location stopped.

== Media accounts ==
The Atlanta Constitution printed a picture of the Paper Mill ruins on the banks of the Soap creek [sic] in May 1932. The caption read "GREAT WALLS BUILT BY SLAVE LABOR… Before the Civil War this building housed a large paper mill." This is the only reference to slavery in the material concerning the Sope Creek Industrial Area. The language of this caption implies that the paper mill never recovered from the burning by Gerrard's men, when in fact it had.

In 1933, the Atlanta Journal printed an article reminiscing about the Marietta Paper Mills. In an editorial note that accompanied the article, a senior staff member at the Journal, H.H. Cabaniss, recalled that the Marietta Paper Mills, under the ownership of Saxon A. Anderson, supplied paper for a great many of the Atlanta-area daily newspapers. In 1867, Cabaniss had been the business manager for the Atlanta New Era and bought his paper in rolls from the Marietta Paper Mills.

== Flour mill, hydroelectric dam, and power plant ==
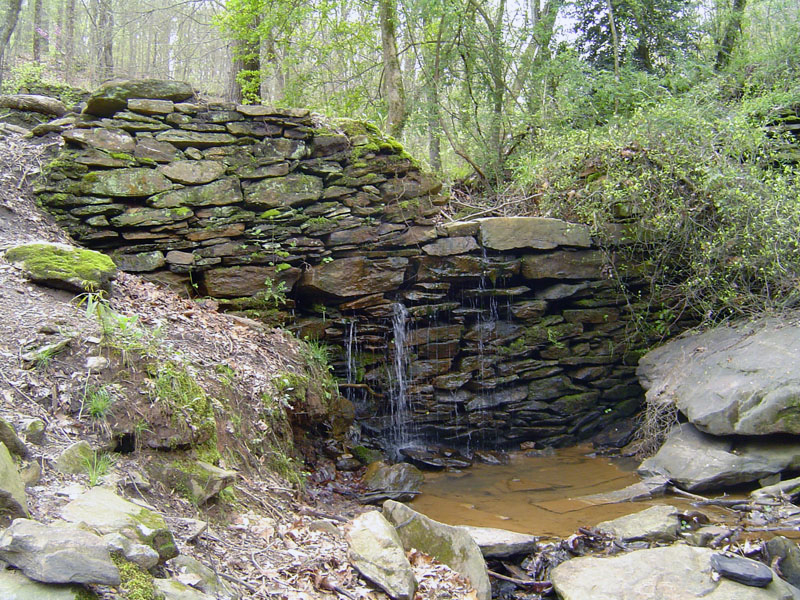
Pulp mill retaining wall ruin

Along with the paper mill was Denmead's Flour Mill. Founded in 1855, Edward Denmead had built a flour mill on the west bank about 200 yards up from where Paper Mill Road and Sope Creek intersect. Denmead apparently ran this operation and shared a road off of Paper Mill Road with the Marietta Paper Mills. The flour mill was burnt at the same time as the paper mill, but apparently was never rebuilt.

In 1922, a hydroelectric dam and a power plant were built on the west side of the creek 900 yards (~820m) upstream from where Paper Mill Road crosses. As of 1973, this dam was inoperable.

When the Georgia Historical Commission (GHC) submitted its report in March 1973, they detailed the purpose of every remaining structure. The description of the site layout was accurate enough that someone could attempt to locate and identify all remaining structures. The mill room: "The largest structure remaining is the mill building downstream from Paper Mill Road approximately ¼ mile on the east bank of the Creek. It contained five rooms and is approximately 300 feet long." The oil room and office was "nearby… just across a small creek." The pulp-grinding mill was "just south of Paper Mill Road. It is two stories high and approximately 100 feet long." Denmead's flourmill was described, although evidence is difficult to spot today, due to construction. Even the foundations of an old bridge, which lay near the aforementioned dam, were identified.

In the GHC report there is no mention of a printing press. In the articles concerning the ruins at Sope Creek, never once is there any mention of a printing press. The idea that the Confederate States of America used to print money on the banks of the Sope Creek had to have developed somewhere.

One single article mentions money printing. The New York Times printed an article on May 31, 1968, written by Lincoln A. Werden, describing the Atlanta Golf Classic being played at Atlanta Country Club. The Atlanta Country Club abuts Sope Creek about a third of a mile from the Sope Creek entrance to the Chattahoochee. Werden writes "The par-3 13th, a 135-yard hole, is a photographer's delight. The tee is on high ground and Soap Creek, a fast moving muddy stream, runs in front of the green. To the left is a waterfall and off to the right of the green is the site of a former Confederate mint."

Other than the golfers, the only source Werden quoted was the tournament director, Jack Tuthill. At that time, Atlanta Country Club was only four years old and hosting a major tournament event.

Research shows there was no mint at the mill on Sope Creek. The paper mill in Marietta was one of the first wood-using mills in the State of Georgia. The wood-using mill went into operation in 1864 shortly after the original mill was burned by the Union Army. The mill made newsprint by grinding loblolly and short-leaf pine mixed with imported pulp. One of the major products manufactured was paper for Confederate money. The story of the mint developed over time from the fact that the mill manufactured and shipped paper that Confederate money was printed on. There was no mint and the mill did not print money but it did manufacture the paper.
