= Robert Gibbs (disambiguation) =

Robert Gibbs (born 1971) is an American communications professional who was White House Press Secretary from 2009 to 2011

Robert Gibbs or Gibbes could also refer to:

- Robert Gibbes (1644–1715), Carolinian English colonial governor
- Bobby Gibbes (Robert Henry Maxwell Gibbes, 1916–2007), Australian military pilot
- Robert Henry Gibbs (1929–1988), American ichthyologist
- Bob Gibbs (Australian politician) (Robert James Gibbs, born 1946), member of the Legislative Assembly of Queensland
- Bob Gibbs (Robert Brian Gibbs, born 1954), American politician and member of the U.S. House of Representatives from Ohio

== See also ==
- Robert Gibb (disambiguation)
- Robert Gibbes House
