= Frobel-Knight-Borders House =

Historic house in the United States

- Frobel--Knight--Borders House
- U.S. National Register of Historic Places
- Location within Georgia
- Location: 1001 Allgood Road, Marietta, Georgia
- Coordinates: 33°58′31″N 84°31′25″W
- Area: 5 acres (2.0 ha)
- Built: 1869
- Architectural style: Italianate
- NRHP reference No.: 95000901
- Added to NRHP: July 21, 1995

The Frobel-Knight-Borders House is a historic house in Marietta, Georgia, U.S. It was built for a Confederate veteran, and it was later the private residence of Marietta's mayor. It is listed on the National Register of Historic Places.

== History ==
The house was built in 1869 for Colonel Bushrod W. Frobel, a veteran of the Confederate States Army during the American Civil War. During the war, he was first a Captain and then Colonel, and then the Chief Engineer of Hood's Army of Tennessee where he supervised the construction of Atlanta's defensive fortifications during the Atlanta Campaign. In the postbellum era, Frobel served as the Georgia Superintendent of Public Works from 1865 to 1873.

The house was later acquired by Judge Noel B. Knight, who served on the Superior Court of Cobb County. Knight was also the mayor of Marietta. He died in 1887.

== Architectural significance ==
The house was designed in the Italianate architectural style. It stands out from other houses in Cobb County which were small wooden houses, and the Greek Revival style was preferred in Georgia at the time. It was listed on the National Register of Historic Places on July 21, 1995.
