= GIPS =

Gips or GIPS may refer to:

== People ==
- Archie Gips, American filmmaker
- Dirk Boest Gips (1864–1920), Dutch sport shooter
- Donald Gips (born 1960), American diplomat
- James Gips (died 2018), American academic

== Other uses ==
- "Gips" (song), by Ringo Sheena, 2000
- Giga (billion) Instructions Per Second
- Global Investment Performance Standards, a set of standards defined for the Certificate in Investment Performance Measurement
- Global IP Solutions, an American corporation
- Grand Island Public Schools, an American public school district

== See also ==
- GIP (disambiguation)
- Gipps (disambiguation)
