= Gerald Gibbs =

Gerald or Gerry Gibbs may refer to:

- Gerald Gibbs, 3rd Baron Aldenham, British peer
- Sir Gerald Gibbs (RAF officer) (1896–1992), British RAF officer
- Gerald Gibbs (cinematographer) (1907–1990), British film technician
- Gerry Gibbs (musician), American jazz drummer
