= William Gibb =

William Gibb may refer to:

- William Gibb (artist) (1839–1929), Scottish artist
- William Gibb (footballer), Scottish footballer
- William Gibb (politician) (1882–1952), Australian politician

== See also ==
- Gibb (surname)
- William Gibbes (disambiguation)
- William Gibbs (disambiguation)
