= Nicholas Gibbs =

John Nicholas Gibbs II (1733–1817) was a German settler in Eastern Tennessee. He was born Johann Nickel Gibbs on September 29, 1733, in the Village of Wallruth in the Duchy of Baden, Holy Roman Empire.

There is a Nicholas Gibbs Historical Society that bought the Gibbs farmstead and applied to make the place a national landmark. It was a rural domestic site was inhabited by four generations of the Nicholas Gibbs family between ca. 1792 and 1913. An archaeological survey was conducted by the University of Tennessee and has helped academics understand the life of early settlers in the region.
