= Samuel Osborne-Gibbes =

British Army officer (1803–1874)

The Honourable Sir Samuel Osborne-Gibbes, 2nd Baronet

Member of the New Zealand Legislative Council
- In office 2 October 1855 – 6 October 1863

Personal details
- Born: 27 August 1803 England
- Died: 12 November 1874 (aged 71)
- Resting place: Christ Church, Whangarei
- Relations: Sir Philip Gibbes, 1st Baronet (grandfather)
- Occupation: Army officer politician plantation owner

Sir Samuel Osborne-Gibbes, 2nd Baronet (27 August 1803 – 12 November 1874) was a British Army officer, Freemason, plantation owner and politician. Born in England, he spent his early years on his father's sugar plantation on Barbados. After his parents' death, he was brought up by an uncle in England. After some military service, he took over the sugar plantation in Barbados, where he remained until the abolition of slavery in 1833. He returned to England, but left his home country in 1850 for Sydney in Australia. In 1855, he emigrated to New Zealand, where he remained for the rest of his life. He was one of the highest Masons in the country and was a Member of the New Zealand Legislative Council from 1855 to 1863.

The baronetcy was inherited from his grandfather and passed on to his son Edward.

== Early life ==
Born in England in 1803 and christened Samuel Osborne Gibbes, he was the grandson of Sir Philip Gibbes, 1st Baronet, by his younger son, Samuel, and Samuel's wife, Sarah Gibbes (née Bishop), of Exeter, Devonshire. He assumed the additional surname of Osborne some years after his inheritance of the title in 1815. He thus became known as Sir Samuel Osborne-Gibbes during the latter part of his life.

Both of his parents died when he was still a small child (his father died in 1807), living in the West Indies. He was taken to England and placed under the legal guardianship of his uncle, Lord Colchester, until he reached his legal majority. He served as a Page of Honour to the Prince of Wales—later King George IV of Great Britain—and before entering the Royal Military Academy Sandhurst in 1817 as an officer cadet, he was educated by private tutors in London and Paris under the supervision of his aunt and Agnes Gibbes (1761–1843). He served in the 96th Regiment following his graduation from Sandhurst in 1819 and was aide-de-camp to the Governor of Nova Scotia (The Earl of Dalhousie) for a time. He eventually resigned his commission, having attained captain's rank. He was admitted to St John's College, Cambridge in 1820.

== Time on Barbados ==
He inherited a sugar plantation on Barbados from his father and resided there from 1821 until 1833, when the British Parliament passed the Slavery Abolition Act and freed the island's slaves. He received financial compensation from the government for the loss of his 'human chattels'; and sold Springhead and his other plantations.

== Family ==
He returned to England to live with his wife, Margaret (née Moore, the grand niece of the Earl of Clonmell), whom he had married in Ireland on 28 September 1825. His first wife died in 1847, however, and he married for a second time the following year. His second wife, Anne Penny, came from the County of Dorset. The Second Baronet's two marital unions produced a number of children, including the initial heir to the baronetcy, Lieutenant Philip Osborne-Gibbes, of the 41st Bengal Native Infantry, who died while on military service at Multan in 1850, aged 24.

== England and Australia ==
During his time in England, Osborne-Gibbes lived mainly in Exeter and in Weymouth, Dorset, where he owned a house. In late 1850, he left the country for good. Accompanied by his second wife, he set sail for Sydney in the Australian colony of New South Wales. His decision to come to Sydney may have been influenced by the presence there of Colonel Gibbes, who had been appointed Sydney's Collector of Customs in 1834. Colonel Gibbes and Osborne-Gibbes became friends and newspaper notices list them as attending Government House receptions together during the early 1850s. Osborne-Gibbes remained in Sydney for about four years, residing in Argyle Place and being embraced by the upper tier of colonial society. In 1855, he was made Provincial Grand Master of New South Wales.

== New Zealand ==
In 1855 Osborne-Gibbes, his wife and their children left Sydney and moved permanently to New Zealand, where further children would be born. He acquired 279 acres (1.13 km^{2}) of farming land at Whangārei, on New Zealand's North Island, erected a house (which he called "Springhead" after his former residence on Barbados), and went on to play a part in the public affairs of the surrounding district. In 1855, he was a founding member of the Waitemata Lodge, the first Masonic lodge in the Auckland Region, and became its first Master.

He was appointed to the New Zealand Legislative Council on 2 October 1855 and remained a member until 6 October 1863, when he resigned. Among his acquaintances in New Zealand was the prominent parliamentarian and pastoralist Alfred Ludlam, who was married to one of Colonel Gibbes' daughters.

The last decade of Osborne-Gibbes's life was clouded by financial difficulties and he was obliged to dispose of most of his land and other assets. He died on 12 November 1874 and was interred at Christ Church, Whangarei. The Bishop of Auckland, William Cowie, conducted the funeral service, which was attended by friends, community leaders, Masons and soldiers. He had become one of the highest Masons in New Zealand. The dowager Lady Gibbes outlived him by 44 years, dying at Mount Eden in 1918. She was survived by two sons (including the 3rd Baronet, their son Edward) and four daughters.

== See also ==
- Osborne-Gibbes Baronets

Baronetage of Great Britain
Preceded by Philip Gibbes	Baronet (of Springhead); 1815–1874	Succeeded by Edward Osborne-Gibbes
