= Robert Gibb =

Robert Gibb may refer to:

- Robert Gibb (courtier) (1490-1558), Scottish courtier
- Robert Gibb (painter) (1845–1932), Scottish painter
- Robert Gibb (poet) (born 1946), American poet
- Bobby Gibb (1902–1953), Australian rules footballer with South Melbourne

== See also ==
- Gibb (surname)
- Robert Gibbs (disambiguation)
