= Graduate Institute of Peace Studies, Kyung Hee University =

Coordinates: 37.596°N 127.052°E

The Graduate Institute of Peace Studies (GIP) was established in 1984 with the aim of training potential world leaders to possess a vision of a new global civil society, and are committed to the promotion of peace and human welfare. GIP is a constituent graduate school at Kyung Hee University. In recognition of the GIP's contribution to international peace efforts, the UNESCO Prize for Peace Education was awarded to GIP in 1993. All classes and official events are conducted in English
