= Gibbs, Idaho =

Location of Gibbs on a map.

Gibbs is a locale in Kootenai County, Idaho, United States.

== Location ==
Gibbs is located within the city of Coeur d'Alene at latitude 47.691 and longitude -116.804, just north-east of the downtown area. It lies just above the mouth of the Spokane River on its northern shore.
