= Gibbs High School =

Gibbs High School may refer to:

- Gibbs High School, Kumta, India
- Gibbs High School (St. Petersburg, Florida), in the Pinellas County school district
- Gibbs High School (Corryton, Tennessee), in the Knox County school district
