= Sir Philip Gibbes, 1st Baronet =

Barbadian planter (1731–1815)

Sir Philip Gibbes, 1st Baronet, also Gibbs (1731–1815) was a planter in Barbados. He was a member of the Barbadian Society for the Improvement of Plantership.

== Life ==
Gibbes was born in St James' Parish, Barbados, on 7 March 1731 and baptised that same year. His parents were Philip Gibbes (died 1763) and his wife Elizabeth Harris. He went back in the male line to Henry Gibbes of Bristol, whose son Philip (died 1648) settled on Barbados, through Philip (died 1697) and Philip (died 1726).

In London at the Middle Temple, Gibbes studied law, before returning to the West Indies to take up his father's sugar estates. He was appointed to the Barbados legislature, advising the island's governor in Bridgetown on legal matters. He spent, however, time in Great Britain, and is considered an absentee owner.

The Gibbes baronetcy was created on 30 May 1774. The associated place name or seat is given as Fackley, with a query added by George Edward Cokayne as Tackley; or Faikley.

Gibbes had discussions in Paris with Benjamin Franklin on the American Revolutionary War. They may first have met in London, in 1774–5. Once the Revolutionary War broke out, Barbados was in an exposed position. In 1777 and again in 1778, Gibbes visited Franklin. The role taken on by Gibbes has been described as "a self-appointed mediator". Franklin moved away from the acceptability of some form of federal system with Great Britain, as is documented in his correspondence with Joseph Priestley. He also reported on the content of these discussions to Arthur Lee. At this time — early 1778 — the king was warning Lord North about Gibbes ahead of an anticipated interview, saying he had heard Gibbes was a "doubtful character". Gibbes was received by the Prime Minister as the head of a group representing the interests of the Caribbean plantation owners,

In 1777 Gibbes joined the Society for the Propagation of the Gospel in Foreign Parts. At the height of the Gordon Riots, on 7 June 1780, Gibbes was quoted in the London Courant as favouring the formation in Marylebone of a volunteer militia unit.

From 1788 token coins (not legal tender) to designs by John Milton were issued on Barbados, that have been attributed to Gibbes. His "Neptune" tokens circulated widely.

Gibbes leased a town house at 4 New Burlington Street from 1798 onwards (to 1815). His health deteriorated in old age and he was afflicted with loss of eyesight. He died at Springhead House on 27 June 1815, while under the care of a plantation manager, and was buried in the grounds of St James Church, Barbados.

== Works ==
Gibbes was a member of the Barbadian Society for the Improvement of Plantership, and the 1789 autobiography of Olaudah Equiano contains a description of him as "the most worthy and humane gentleman".

His works included:

- Instructions for the Management of a Plantation in Barbadoes and for the Treatment of Negroes (London, 1786), co-author in a collective work, attributed in the most part to Edward Drax.
- Instructions for the Treatment of Negroes (1786, anonymous); second edition 1797. The second edition drew on pamphlets by Count Rumford on pauperism. As with some other related publications of the period, it argued for regulation of slavery, rather than its abolition.
- Letter to John Beckles, Esq., Attorney General at Barbadoes, and Correspondence between them on the subject of the Conveyance of the Kendal Plantation being Unfairly obtained (1802)

The anonymous Reflections on the proclamation of the second of July 1783, relative to the trade between the United States of America and the West India islands: addressed to the Right Honourable William Pitt, first lord of the Treasury, and chancellor of the Exchequer has been attributed to him.

== Family ==
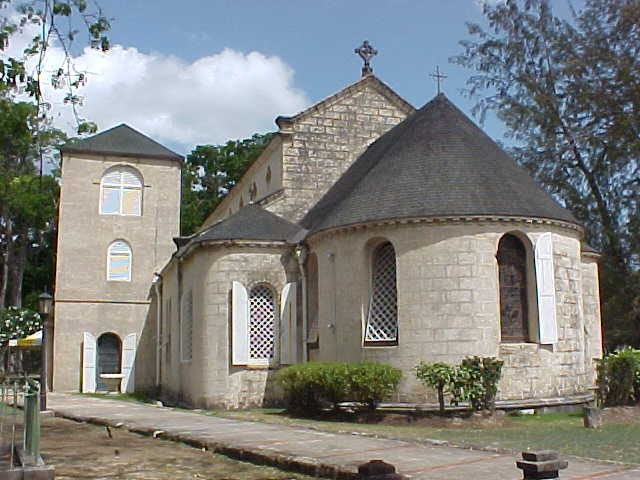
St James Church, Barbados

At St James Church, Barbados, in 1753, Gibbes married Agnes Osborne—the only child and sole heiress of another Barbadian planter of English origin, Samuel Osborne. County Kent was the ancestral home of the Osbornes; the family established a presence in Barbados in 1634 with the arrival of Richard Osborn[e] in St James' Parish. She predeceased her husband, dying in London in 1813.

Sir Philip and Lady Gibbes had four children, all born on Barbados. They were raised largely in England by Lady Gibbes, while Sir Philip concentrated on his business and political affairs in Barbados, London and Bristol. During the 1780s, she and the children stayed near Wolverhampton—at Hilton Park (the ancestral seat of the Vernon family) in rural Staffordshire, where she and her daughters had a visit in 1783 from John Wesley. The children had as governess Mary Freeman (1731–1815, later Mary Freeman Shepherd), Wesley's correspondent.

The eldest son, Philip, was a Cambridge graduate and judge on the Barbados bench. He served as Chief Justice of Barbados, but was removed from the position by Governor George Poyntz Ricketts in 1797, in controversy over the murder trial of Joseph Denny, a man of mixed race. He married Maria Knipe in 1807, and died 14 December 1812. Maria then in 1818 married Sir John Palmer-Acland, 1st Baronet as his second wife;

The other children were:

- Samuel Osborne, a sugar planter and Receiver-General of Grenada, father with his wife (née Bishop, of Exeter) of Samuel Osborne Gibbes, 2nd Baronet, died 1807;
- Elizabeth, who married Charles Abbot, 1st Baron Colchester in 1797; and
- Agnes, unmarried.

During the early 19th century, Gibbes became estranged from his two sons. Elizabeth's marriage connected the Gibbes family to that of Jeremy Bentham, since Charles Abbot's widowed mother Sarah remarried to Jeremiah Bentham, father of Jeremy.

== Notes ==
Baronetage of Great Britain
New creation	Baronet (of Springhead); 1774–1815	Succeeded by Samuel Osborne-Gibbes
