= Joanna Barnden =

British author known as Anna Stuart and Joanna Courtney (born 1972)

- Born: Joanna Courtney Gibb; 1972 (age 53–54); St Andrews, Fife, Scotland
- Other names: Joanna Courtney; Anna Stuart
- Education: Sidney Sussex College, Cambridge
- Years active: 2013–present
- Spouse: Stuart Barnden
- Children: 2

Joanna Barnden (née Gibb; born 1972) is a British author of historical fiction who writes as Anna Stuart for her World War II novels and Joanna Courtney for novels set in other periods (Courtney is Barnden's middle name).

== Biography ==
Born Joanna Gibb in St Andrews, Scotland, Barnden attended Loughborough High School from Year 9. She studied English literature at Sidney Sussex College, Cambridge.

After graduating, Barnden worked as a factory planner and started a family, initially writing only in her spare time. Her first short story was published in The People's Friend around 2001 and she went on to publish more than two hundred short stories in women's magazines before turning her attention to long-form fiction. For a time around 2013 and 2014 she was a creative writing tutor at the Open University.

Her work has been translated into several languages, including French, German, Hungarian, Italian and Spanish, and she has enjoyed considerable success beyond the anglosphere. For example, the French translation of The Midwife of Auschwitz (La Sage-femme d'Auschwitz) had sold over half a million copies by the end of 2024.

Barnden lives in Kirk Langley with her husband Stuart. They have two children.

== Publications ==
=== As Joanna Barnden ===
- 2013 : Running Against the Tide (Robert Hale) — London's docklands in the early nineteenth century

=== As Joanna Courtney ===
Series: Queens of the Conquest

- 2015 : The Chosen Queen (Macmillan) — Edith of Mercia
- 2016 : The Constant Queen (Macmillan) — Elizaveta of Kiev
- 2017 : The Conqueror's Queen (Macmillan) — Mathilda of Flanders

Series: Shakespeare's Queens

- 2018 : Blood Queen (Piatkus) — Lady Macbeth
- 2019 : Fire Queen (Piatkus) — Ophelia
- 2020 : Iron Queen (Piatkus) — Cordelia

Series: Women of the Ancient World

- 2023 : Cleopatra and Julius (Piatkus) — the Egyptian queen and the Roman general
- 2023 : Salome (Piatkus) — the Jewish princess
- 2026 : Mary of Magdala (Piatkus) — the disciple of Jesus

Other works

- 2015 : The Christmas Court, novella (Pan Books) — a seasonal tale set in the Queens of the Conquest universe

=== As Anna Stuart ===
Series: World War II Remembered
Three novels in which a young woman of today connects with a woman who lived through the Second World War.

- 2021 : The Berlin Zookeeper (Bookouture)
- 2021 : The Secret Diary (Bookouture)
- 2021 : A Letter from Pearl Harbor (Bookouture)

Series: Women of War

- 2022 : The Midwife of Auschwitz (Bookouture) — freely inspired by the experience of Stanisława Leszczyńska
- 2023 : The Midwife of Berlin (Bookouture) — sequel focused on the fictitious assistant Ester Pasternak
- 2024 : The War Orphan (Bookouture) — partly inspired by the work of Alice Goldberger (1897–1986)
- 2024 : The Resistance Sisters (Bookouture)
- 2024 : The Secret Message (Bookouture)
- 2026 : The Last Baby in Auschwitz (Bookouture)
- 2026 : The Children on the Train (Bookouture)

Series: The Bletchley Park Girls

- 2022 : The Bletchley Girls (Bookouture)
- 2023 : Code Name Elodie (Bookouture)

Series: Inspirational WW2 Stories

- 2025 : The English Wife (Bookouture) — freely inspired by the experience of Clementine Churchill
- 2025 : The President’s Wife (Bookouture) — freely inspired by the experience of Eleanor Roosevelt

Contemporary fiction

- 2019 : Bonnie and Stan (Trapeze)
- 2020 : Four Minutes to Save a Life (Trapeze)
