= Genome India Project =

Indian genome project

Genome India Project (GIP)
- Type of project: Research
- Country: India
- Prime Minister(s): Narendra Modi
- Ministry: Department of Biotechnology
- Launched: 3 January 2020; 5 years ago
- Status: Active

Genome India Project (GIP) is a research initiative led by the Bangalore-based Indian Institute of Science's Centre for Brain Research and involves over 20 universities across the country in an effort to gather samples, compile data, conduct research, and create an ‘Indian reference genome' grid.

== Background ==
The initiative is funded by Department of Biotechnology (DBT) to sequence at least 10,000 Indian genomes in phase 1. The goal of the research is to develop predictive diagnostic indicators for several high-priority diseases and other uncommon and genetic disorders. In phase 2, the project would collect genetic samples from patients with three broad categories - cardiovascular diseases, mental illness, and cancer.

=== Participating institutions ===
The list includes:

- All India Institute of Medical Sciences, Jodhpur
- Centre for Cellular and Molecular Biology
- Centre for DNA Fingerprinting and Diagnostics
- Institute of Genomics and Integrative Biology
- Gujarat Biotechnology Research Centre, Gandhinagar
- Indian Institute of Information Technology, Allahabad
- Indian Institute of Science Education and Research, Pune
- Indian Institute of Technology, Madras
- Indian Institute of Technology, Delhi
- Indian Institute of Technology Jodhpur
- Institute of Bioresources And Sustainable Development, Imphal
- Institute of Life Sciences, Bhubhaneswar
- Mizoram University
- National Centre for Biological Sciences
- National Institute of Biomedical Genomics
- National Institute of Mental Health and Neurosciences
- Rajiv Gandhi Centre for Biotechnology
- Sher-i-Kashmir Institute of Medical Sciences
