= Gipp =

Gipp is a surname. Notable people with the surname include:

- Big Gipp (Cameron Gipp, born 1973), an American rapper
- Chuck Gipp (Charles R. Gipp, born 1947), an American politician
- David Gipp (born 1969), British footballer
- George Gipp (1895–1920), American college football player known as "the Gipper"

== Fictional characters ==
- Joe Gipp, a character in the 1987 American teen comedy film Adventures in Babysitting

== See also ==
- Gibb, a surname
- GIP (disambiguation)
- Gipps, a surname
- Gipps (disambiguation)
