= Paul Gibbs =

Paul Gibbs may refer to:

- Paul Gibbs (cricketer) (born 1965), New Zealand cricketer
- Paul Gibbs (footballer) (born 1972), English former footballer
- Paul Gibbs (rugby union) (born 1941), rugby union player who represented Australia
- Paul Gibbs, founder of the Pais Movement
