= Jonathan Gibbs =

Jonathan Gibbs may refer to:

- Jonathan Clarkson Gibbs (1821–1874), Presbyterian minister and powerful African-American Florida officeholder during Reconstruction
- Jonathan Gibbs (composer) (fl. 1983–1986), British composer for the BBC Radiophonic Workshop between 1983 and 1986
- Jonathan Gibbs (bishop) (born 1961), diocesan Bishop of Rochester in the Church of England
- Jonathan Gibbs (1975–2003), co-pilot of Air Midwest Flight 5481

== See also ==
- John Gibbs (disambiguation)
- Jonny Gibb of Survivor
