= William Gibbes =

William Gibbes may refer to:

- William Gibbes (MP for Suffolk) (died 1689)
- William Gibbes (died 1570), MP for Launceston (UK Parliament constituency)
- William Gibbes (died c.1586), MP for Worcester (UK Parliament constituency)
- William Gibbes (cricketer) (1880–1918), New Zealand cricketer
- William John Gibbes (1815–1868), son of John George Nathaniel Gibbes

== See also ==
- William Gibbes House, Charleston, South Carolina
- Gibbes (surname)
- William Gibbs (disambiguation)
- William Gibb (disambiguation)
