= Gipps =

Gipps is a surname. Notable people with the name include:

- Caroline Gipps (born 1948), British academic and vice-chancellor of the University of Wolverhampton (2005–2011)
- George Gipps (1791–1847), Governor of New South Wales, Australia
- George Gipps (MP for Canterbury) (died 1800)
- George Gipps (MP for Ripon), MP for Ripon in 1807
- Henry Plumptre Gipps (1813–1859), MP for Canterbury
- Reginald Gipps (1831–1908), British Army general and Military Secretary
- Richard Gipps (1659–1708), English Master of the Revels and historian
- Ruth Gipps (1921–1999), British composer
- Tommy Gipps (1888–?), English footballer

== See also ==
- The dictionary definition of Gipps at Wiktionary
- Simon Gipps-Kent (1958–1987), British actor
- Gipp, a surname, including a list of people with the name
