= Government investment pool =

A government investment pool (GIP), or local government investment pool (LGIP), is a state or local government pool offered to public entities for the investment of public funds. These pools are important investments tools, offering safety with a competitive yield. GIP managers are vested with a public trust that the pool will maintain liquidity, diversity, and follow the investment pool’s guidelines. GIPs have a history of prudent management; however, there have been several isolated instances of fund losses. Despite these failures, GIPs are required to provide regularly reporting and disclosure to its participants, fund investors.

Although many GIPs are managed by government employees, there are also GIPs that are managed by outside investment firms.

== Participants ==
Participants in a government investment pool may include state or local municipalities, counties, school districts, utility districts, and local government units. State laws or GIP rules and procedures govern the types of participants that can invest in a GIP. Multiple GIPs can be created within a single state.

== Investment types ==
Investments may include, but are not restricted to, certificates of deposit (CD), US Treasuries, US Agencies, repurchase agreements, and commercial paper.

== Regulation ==
Similar to any fund, a GIP follows a set of investment guidelines imposed by the board. Even though the SEC does not regulate GIPs, the pools seek to maintain safe investment strategies. Many states adopted guidelines recommended by various public associations, such as the National Association of State Treasurers (NAST), the Government Finance Officers Association (GFOA), the Association of Public Treasurers of US & Canada (APT US&C) and the Governmental Accounting Standards Board (GASB). Many GIPs have also acquired a rating from Standard & Poor's, and rated GIPs follow a conservative set of guidelines set by the rating agency.
