= Peter Gibbs =

Peter Gibbs may refer to:

- Peter Gibbs (weather forecaster) (born 1958), British weather forecaster
- Peter Gibbs (cricketer) (born 1944), English cricketer and television script writer
- Peter Wyldbore Gibbs (1934–2001), Private Secretary to the British Princess Anne
- Peter Gibbs (1920–1975), English violinist and RAF pilot in No. 41 Squadron RAF. Died under inexplicable circumstances known as the Great Mull Air Mystery
- Peter Gibbs, board member of UK Financial Investments and chairman of Turquoise
- Peter Gibbs, footballer who played for Watford F.C. in 1975–1976
