= Keith Gibbs =

South African cricketer

Personal information
- Full name: Keith Lawley Gibbs
- Born: 30 December 1933 (age 92); Bloemfontein, Orange Free State, South Africa
- Batting: Right-handed
- Bowling: Right-arm fast-medium

Domestic team information
- Years: Team
- 1951–52 to 1953–54: Orange Free State
- 1956–57 to 1959–60: Transvaal

Career statistics
Competition	First-class
Matches	32
Runs scored	481
Batting average	14.14
100s/50s	0/1
Top score	80*
Balls bowled	6883
Wickets	101
Bowling average	27.44
5 wickets in innings	1
10 wickets in match	0
Best bowling	5/79
Catches/stumpings	15/–
- Source: Cricinfo, 8 June 2018

Keith Lawley Gibbs (born 30 December 1933) is a former South African cricketer who played first-class cricket for Orange Free State from 1951 to 1954 and for Transvaal from 1956 to 1960.

Keith Gibbs was a right-arm opening bowler who was a consistent wicket-taker in South African domestic cricket in the 1950s. He twice played for a South African XI against touring teams – against MCC in 1956–57 and the Australians in 1957–58 – but was not selected in the Test team. He took his best figures of 5 for 79 and 3 for 20 when Orange Free State beat Eastern Province in the Currie Cup in 1952–53.
