= Hajib, Iran =

Hajib حجيب
- Village
- Location within Iran
- Coordinates: 35°32′25″N 50°09′57″E
- Country: Iran
- Province: Qazvin
- County: Buin Zahra
- Bakhsh: Central
- Rural District: Zahray-ye Pain

Population (2006)
  - Total: 208
- Time zone: UTC+3:30 (IRST)
  - Summer (DST): UTC+4:30 (IRDT)

Hajib (Persian: حجيب, also Romanized as Ḩajīb and Hejīb; also known as Jīb) is a village in Zahray-ye Pain Rural District, in the Central District of Buin Zahra County, Qazvin Province, Iran. At the 2006 census, its population was 208, in 45 families.
