= William and Caroline Gibbs House =

Historic house in Illinois, United States

- U.S. National Register of Historic Places
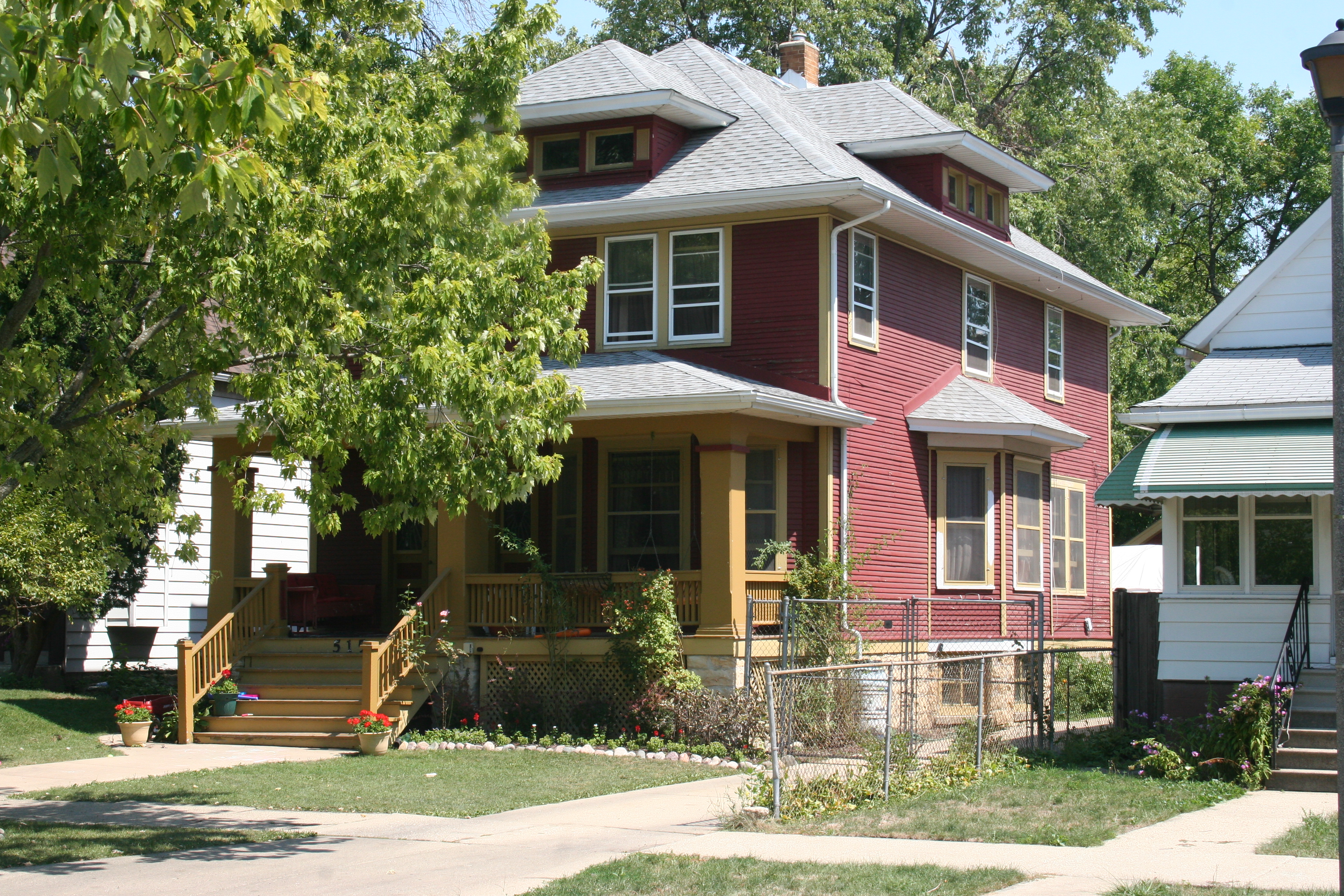

- Location within Chicago metropolitan area Location within Illinois Location within the United States
- Location: 515 N. 3rd Ave., Maywood, Illinois
- Coordinates: 41°53′32″N 87°50′12″W
- Area: less than one acre
- Built: 1907
- Architectural style: American Foursquare
- MPS: Maywood MPS
- NRHP reference No.: 92000048
- Added to NRHP: February 24, 1992

The William and Caroline Gibbs House is a historic house at 515 N. 3rd Avenue in Maywood, Illinois. The American Foursquare house was built in 1907. The house has a standard Foursquare layout with a square shape, a pyramidal roof with dormers, and a front porch. In keeping with its style, its interior has a functional layout with a central staircase, an easily accessible kitchen, and built-in furniture. As was common in Foursquare homes, the house has simple geometric detailing inspired by the Craftsman movement, such as wood trim, leadlight windows, and square columns.

The house was added to the National Register of Historic Places on February 24, 1992.
