= Suicide of William Arthur Gibbs =

English 1877 child suicide

William Arthur Gibbs (1865 – 4 May 1877) was the son of a glass-painter from Kingsland Road and a schoolboy at Christ's Hospital school in Sussex, England, who came to public attention after committing suicide by hanging on 4 May 1877 at age 12 out of fear of repeated punishments, including flogging, for having run away from the school to his family home. Gibbs had complained to his sister and his father that he was made a fag at school, that an older student had held his head underwater while he was bathing and that he would rather hang himself than be made a fag to that older student again. This caused an outcry and the government subsequently held an official inquiry. At the inquiry, held on 14 July that year, Gibbs' father testified that Gibbs, who was characterised as being stubborn had refused to go to school that day and said he would rather hang himself. The school nurse, Mary Perrin, also testified at the inquiry that she had found Gibbs dead in the school infirmary at 11:40 AM. 15-year-old Herbert Arthur Copeland, the student to whom Gibbs was made a fag, said that Gibbs was "not a good boy", and that he was "quarrelsome and determined". However, Copeland also admitted to corporally punishing Gibbs to the point he cried, despite not being allowed to do so, saying he did it because Gibbs "told untruths". The school warden, one Major Brackenbury, denied that Gibbs had ever made a complaint to him. The jury at the inquiry returned a verdict finding that Gibbs had died as a result of "suicide whilst in a state of temporary insanity".
