= Francisco João da Costa =

Portuguese journalist (1859–1900)

- Died: 1900 (aged 40–41)
- Occupation: Journalist

Francisco João da Costa (28 December 1859 – 1900), also known by his pen name Gip (stylized in all caps), was a Portuguese journalist and a major figure in Goan journalism of the nineteenth century.

== Early life ==
Costa was born into a powerful dynasty, with both Catholic and Brahmin roots, which had supported Portugal's Regeneration and also supported the extension of constitutional and democratic rights to Portuguese India. Costa studied law, and developed a profile as a journalist and short-story writer alongside his legal career. Costa's uncle Bernardo Francisco da Costa owned the weekly journal O Ultramar, associated with the Partido Ultramarino and Goa's Brahmin caste.

== Career ==
Costa began writing for O Ultramar in 1882, most famously contributing the novel Jacob e Dulce ('Jacob and Dulce') in serial form between 10 November 1894 and 1 June 1895, prior to publishing the work as a book in 1896. It is set in a thinly disguised version of Costa's home town, Margão, and focuses its satire on the Catholic bourgeoisie of the Velhas Conquistas of Portuguese Goa. 'Rather than a novel, Jacob e Dulce is perhaps best read as a series of sketches pushed forward narratively by the machinations surrounding an arranged marriage' between its eponymous protagonists. Influenced by the writing of the Portuguese satiric realist Eça de Queiroz, Jacob e Dulce is noted for moving Goan writing beyond romanticism towards social realism, developing social sature, and capturing a colloquial and local tone in the Portuguese dialogue. It has run to several editions.

It appears that the opprobrium which Costa's satires provoked led him to cease fiction-writing after Dulce e Dulce.

== Translations ==
- Francisco João da Costa, Jacob & Dulce (sketches from Indo-Portuguese life), trans. by Álvaro Noronha da Costa (New Delhi: Sahitya Akademi, 2004)
- GIP, 'Jacob and Carapinho', in Lengthening Shadows, trans. by Paul Melo e Castro, 2 vols (Saligão: Goa, 1556, 2016), I pp. 83–86.
