= William Gibbs House =

Historic house in Massachusetts, United States

- U.S. National Register of Historic Places
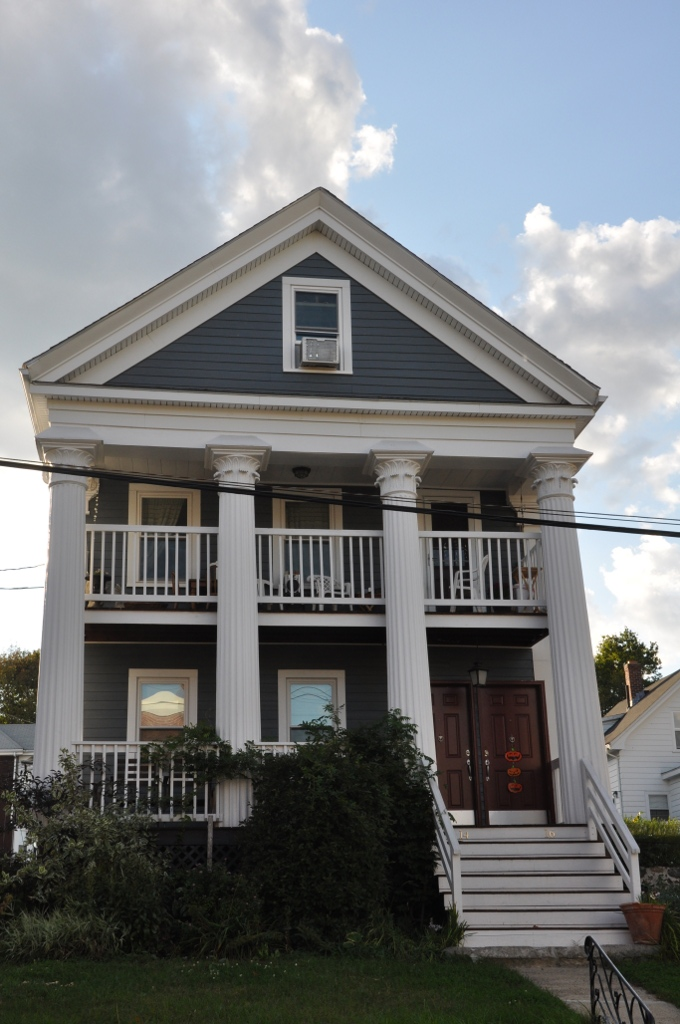

- Location within Massachusetts Location within the United States
- Location: 14 Liberty St., Waltham, Massachusetts
- Coordinates: 42°22′37″N 71°14′1″W
- Built: 1845
- Architectural style: Greek Revival
- MPS: Waltham MRA
- NRHP reference No.: 89001561
- Added to NRHP: September 28, 1989

The William Gibbs House is a historic house in Waltham, Massachusetts. Built c. 1830–54, this 2 1/2-story wood-frame house is one Waltham's few temple-front Greek Revival houses. It has four two-story Corinthian columns supporting a fully pedimented gable with a deep, dentillated cornice. It was probably built in the 1840s by William Gibbs, a hat manufacturer, and was sold by him to another hat maker who lost it to foreclosure.

The house was listed on the National Register of Historic Places in 1989.

== See also ==
- National Register of Historic Places listings in Waltham, Massachusetts
