= Osborne-Gibbes baronets =

Title of the Baronetage of Great Britain

- Escutcheon of the Osborne-Gibbes baronets of Spring Head, Barbados
- Creation date: 1774
- Status: extinct
- Extinction date: 1940
- Motto: Tenax propositi, Tenacious of purpose
- Arms: per fess argent and ermine, three battle-axes sable
- Crest: an arm embowed in steel armour, garnished or, and charged with a cross couped gules, the hand in a gauntlet grasping a battle-axe as in the arms

The Gibbes, later Osborne-Gibbes Baronetcy, of Springhead in Barbados, was a title in the Baronetage of Great Britain. It was created on 30 May 1774 for Philip Gibbes, a wealthy Barbadian plantation owner.

== Osborne-Gibbes baronets, of Springhead (1774) ==
- Sir Philip Gibbes, 1st Baronet (1731–1815);
- Sir Samuel Osborne-Gibbes, 2nd Baronet (1803–1874)—grandson of the 1st Baronet and the orphaned son of Samuel Gibbes, of Barbados, and Sarah Gibbes (née Bishop, of the City of Exeter, Devonshire, England);
- Sir Edward Osborne-Gibbes, 3rd Baronet (1850–1931)
- Sir Philip Arthur Osborne-Gibbes, 4th Baronet (1884–1940), died without heir.

== Sir Philip Gibbes, 1st Baronet ==
Sir Philip Gibbes, 1st Baronet (1731–1815) was a planter in Barbados. He was also a lawyer, and author of books dealing with the management of slaves and sugar estates. He chaired the West India Planters' and Traders' Association.

== Sir Samuel Osborne-Gibbes, 2nd Baronet ==
Sir Samuel Osborne-Gibbes, Second Baronet (27 August 1803 – 12 November 1874) was a British Army officer, Freemason, plantation owner and politician. Born in England, he spent his early years on his father's sugar plantation on Barbados. After his parents' death, he was brought up by an uncle in England. After some military service, he took over the sugar plantation in Barbados, where he remained until the abolition of slavery in 1833. He returned to England, but left his home country in 1850 for Sydney in Australia, where he met up with his nephew, Colonel John Gibbes. In 1855, he emigrated to New Zealand, where he remained for the rest of his life. He was one of the highest Masons in the country and was a Member of the New Zealand Legislative Council from 1855 to 1863.

The baronetcy was inherited from his grandfather and passed on to his son Edward.

== The third and fourth Baronets ==
The Third Baronet, the eldest surviving male child of the Second Baronet, was born at sea, en route to Sydney, in November 1850. (Some genealogical sources state that he was born in Colchester, County Essex, England, but his birth was registered in Sydney—see the NSW Registry of Births, Deaths & Marriages, certificate number V1850502 37A/1850.) He was taken to New Zealand by his parents when still a small child and later educated St John's College, Auckland. He became a regular church-goer as a consequence of his schooling and upbringing. In 1879, he married Sarah Mitchell, the daughter of a property owner and captain in the New Zealand militia. They had several children, including Alice Anne (born 1880), Hinermarama (born 1882) and Philip Arthur Osborne-Gibbes (born 1884)—who would become the Fourth Baronet.

A civil servant, the Third Baronet had entered the New Zealand Department of Education in Wellington in 1871 as a clerk. He rose to become the head of the entire department, laying the foundations of the country's modern public education system during his 16-year term in office. (See T.J. Bertram's 1993 biographical article on the Second Baronet, cited below, for an assessment of his career as Secretary of Education.) The Third Baronet was a Freemason like his father and a keen sportsman. He died in Wellington on 29 September 1931. His surviving brother, Philip Osborne-Gibbes, a retired Gilbert Islands trader, died in a Sydney hospital three years later without male issue.

The Fourth Baronet was born in Wellington on 17 May 1884. He wed Mabel Jeanetta Warner in 1913. Their marital union did not produce any children, however, and consequently the Osborne-Gibbes Baronetcy became extinct with the death of the Fourth Baronet on 8 February 1940 (although descendants of the Second and Third Baronet, through various female lines, are still living in New Zealand and Australia). The Fourth Baronet was a veteran of military service with the New Zealand armed forces during the First World War but unlike his predecessors, he had never felt comfortable with his aristocratic title, believing that it was an anachronism in a modern democratic society such as New Zealand's.

== Early history of the family ==
The surname of Gibbes is of Norman origin. The forebears of the Barbados baronets can be traced back to 14th-century Devonshire. Belonging to the landed gentry, they intermarried with other propertied families and grew in importance during the reign of King Richard II of England. They possessed a semi-fortified stone manor house and barn complex named Venton and raised livestock near the edge of Dartmoor. The British Listed Buildings' Website states that: "The Gibbes were notorious local insurgents, who maintained a small private army from about 1501 to 1549."

During the Tudor era, members of the particular line of the Gibbes family that is the subject of this article left Devon for the neighbouring county of Somerset, and are recorded in official documents as possessing a considerable amount of property in and around the small northern Somersetshire town of Bedminster. The Gibbes expanded their interests, acquiring further property in the nearby trading port of Bristol, where they flourished as Merchant Venturers with links to the wool and cloth export industry and, later on, with the brewing industry as well.

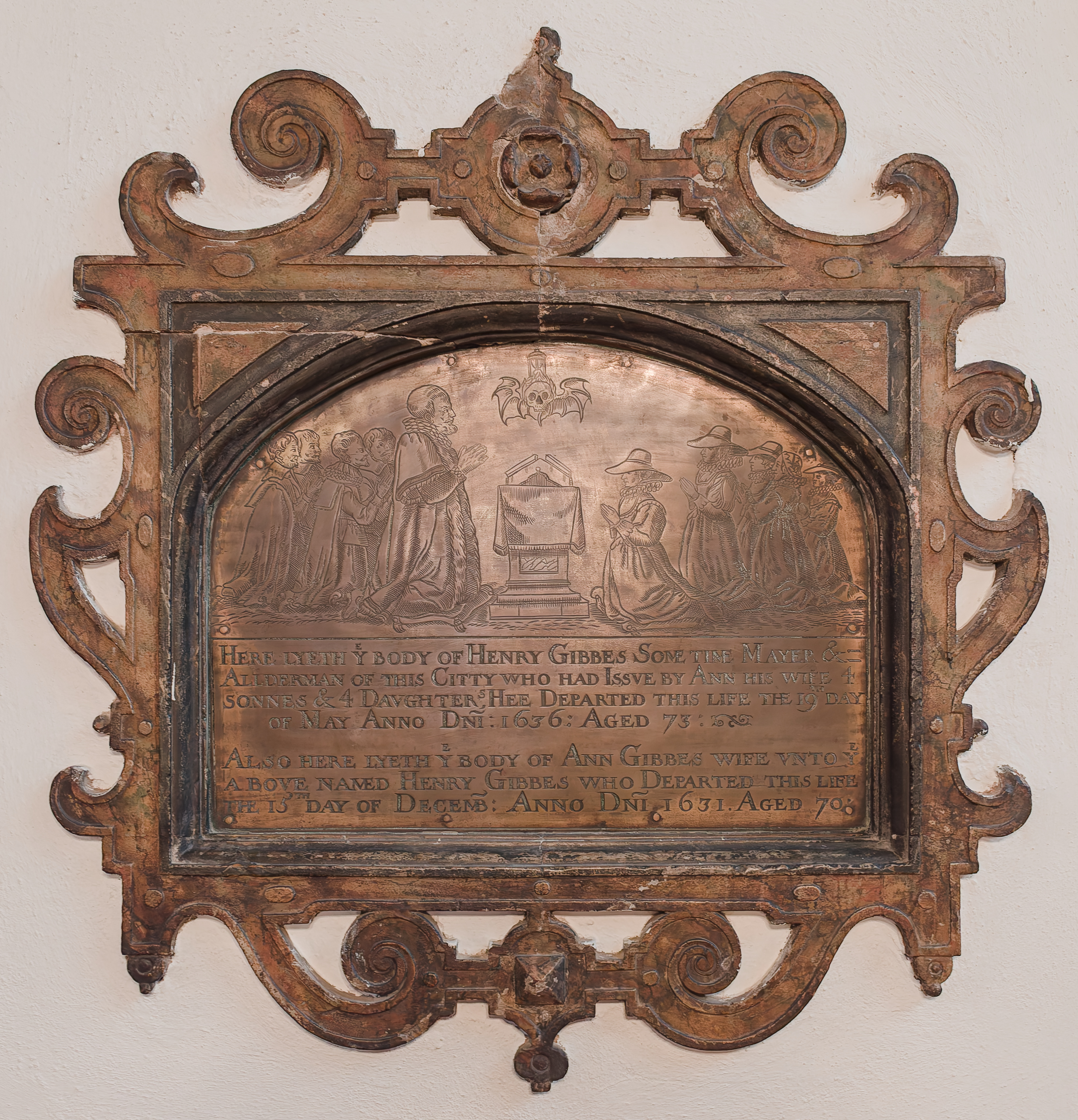
The monumental brass of Henry Gibbes in St James' Priory, Bristol

One of the direct ancestors of the future baronets, Henry Gibbes (1563–1636), of Redcliffe Street, was a mayor of Bristol and an "alderman of the city". He married Anne Packer (1561–1631), of Cheltenham, and an engraved brass memorial commemorating them and their children can be seen in Bristol's Priory Church of St James. Twelve months before his death, an ailing Henry Gibbes had sent the youngest of his three sons, Philip, to the newly colonised West Indian island of Barbados to seek his fortune. He would be joined later on Barbados by some other members of his immediate family—as well as by representatives of the wider Gibbes clan. Barbados was in those days a proprietary colony of Great Britain. It became a refuge for Royalists.

Philip Gibbes was a supporter of the monarchy and a Cavalier by political and religious persuasion. He acquired land on Barbados' west coast and prospered through the propagation of sugarcane. He died at his plantation in St James Parish of a tropical fever in 1648; he had married a woman named Avis and founded an island dynasty: Sir Philip Gibbes, 1st Baronet was a great-grandson. The Gibbes family made their money by harvesting and milling bulk loads of sugarcane, using black slave labour, imported from Africa. They distilled and exported rum and participated in the Triangular Trade. Landmarks along the western coastline of Barbados such as Gibbes Beach, Gibbes Bay and the village of Gibbes still commemorate the family's name.

== Notes ==
Baronetage of Great Britain
Preceded by Montgomery baronets	Gibbes baronets of Springhead; 30 May 1774	Succeeded by Raymond baronets
