= Gibb =

Gibb is a surname of Scottish origin dating to the sixteenth century. It is a diminutive of "Gilbert".

== Notable people with the given name ==
- Andrew Gibb Maitland (1864–1951), English-born Australian geologist
- Gibb McLaughlin (1884–1960), English film actor
- James Gibb Ross (1819–1888), Canadian merchant and politician
- James Gibb Stuart (1920–2013), British financial author
- Jeffrey Gibb Kennett (born 1948), former Premier of Victoria, Australia

== Notable people with the surname ==
- Alexander Gibb (1872–1958), Scottish civil engineer
- Ali Gibb (born 1976), English footballer
- Andrea Gibb (21st century), Scottish screenwriter and actor
- Andy Gibb (1958–1988), English-born Australian singer and teen idol; younger brother of the Bee Gees
- Barry Gibb (born 1946), English singer, songwriter and producer; oldest of the three brothers who formed the Bee Gees
- Bobbi Gibb (born 1942), American long-distance runner
- Camilla Gibb (born 1968), Canadian writer
- Colin Gibb (1953–2024), British musician
- Cynthia Gibb (born 1963), American actress and former model
- Delaney Gibb (born 2005), Canadian basketball player
- Donald Gibb (1954–2026), American actor
- E. Glenadine Gibb (1919–1984), American mathematics education researcher
- Elias John Wilkinson Gibb (1857–1901), Scottish orientalist
- George Gibb (transport administrator) (1850–1925), Scottish transport administrator
- George Gibb (footballer) (1891–1917), Scottish footballer
- Gordon Gibb (21st century), CEO of Flamingo Land Ltd
- Hamilton Alexander Rosskeen Gibb (1895–1971), Scottish scholar of Islam and the Middle East
- Hugh Gibb (1916–1992), English drummer and bandleader, the father of British musicians, Barry, Robin, Maurice and Andy Gibb.
- Jake Gibb (born 1976), American beach volleyball player
- James Gibb (disambiguation), multiple people
- Jo Gibb (born 1976), Scottish theatre actress
- Joanna Barnden (née Gibb) (born 1972), British author of historical fiction
- Joel Gibb (born 1977), Canadian artist
- John Gibb (disambiguation), people named John Gibb
- Maurice Gibb (1949–2003), English rock bass guitarist; twin brother of Robin and also a Bee Gees member
- Maurie Gibb (1914–2000), Australian rules footballer
- Moira Gibb (born 1950), British public servant and social worker
- Nick Gibb (born 1960), British politician
- Paul Gibb (1913–1977), English cricketer
- Peter Gibb (1954–2011), Australian criminal and prison escapee
- Robert Gibb (disambiguation), multiple people
  - Robert Gibb (painter) (1845–1932), Scottish painter
  - Robert Gibb (poet) (born 1946), American poet
- Robin Gibb (1949–2012), British singer and songwriter; twin brother of Maurice and also a Bee Gees member
- Russ Gibb (1931–2019), American concert promoter and media personality
- Steve Gibb (born 1973), English guitarist, the son of Barry Gibb
- Thomas Gibb (disambiguation), multiple people
- Walter Gibb (1919–2006), British test pilot
- William Gibb (disambiguation), multiple people

== See also ==
- Gibbs (surname)
- Gibbes (surname)
