= Joe Gibbs (cricketer) =

Grenadian cricketer (1946–2011)

Personal information
- Full name: Ernest Gregory Gibbs
- Born: 14 May 1946; Grenada
- Died: 9 January 2011 (aged 64); Grenada
- Batting: Right-handed
- Bowling: Right-arm leg spin

Domestic team information
- Years: Team
- 1967–1973: Windward Islands
- Source: CricketArchive, 24 February 2016

Ernest Gregory "Joe" Gibbs BEM (14 May 1946 – 9 January 2011) was a Grenadian cricketer who played for the Windward Islands in West Indian domestic cricket. He played as a right-arm leg-spin bowler.

Gibbs made his first-class debut in March 1967, playing for the Windwards in a friendly against the Leeward Islands. In January 1971, against the same team, he took a maiden first-class five-wicket haul, 5/46 from 21.4 overs. In the return fixture, played in January 1972, Gibbs surpassed his previous effort, taking 7/49 from 27 overs. He consequently became the first Windward Islands bowler to take seven wickets in an innings. Gibbs made his final first-class appearance in April 1973, against the touring Australians. He took the wickets of Doug Walters and Kerry O'Keeffe in Australia's only innings.

In later life, Gibbs worked for Grenada's Ministry of Health, and was awarded the British Empire Medal in 1991 for his public service. He died in January 2011.
