= Robert Gibbes House =

South Carolina historical home

Coordinates: 32.7900°N 79.9344°W

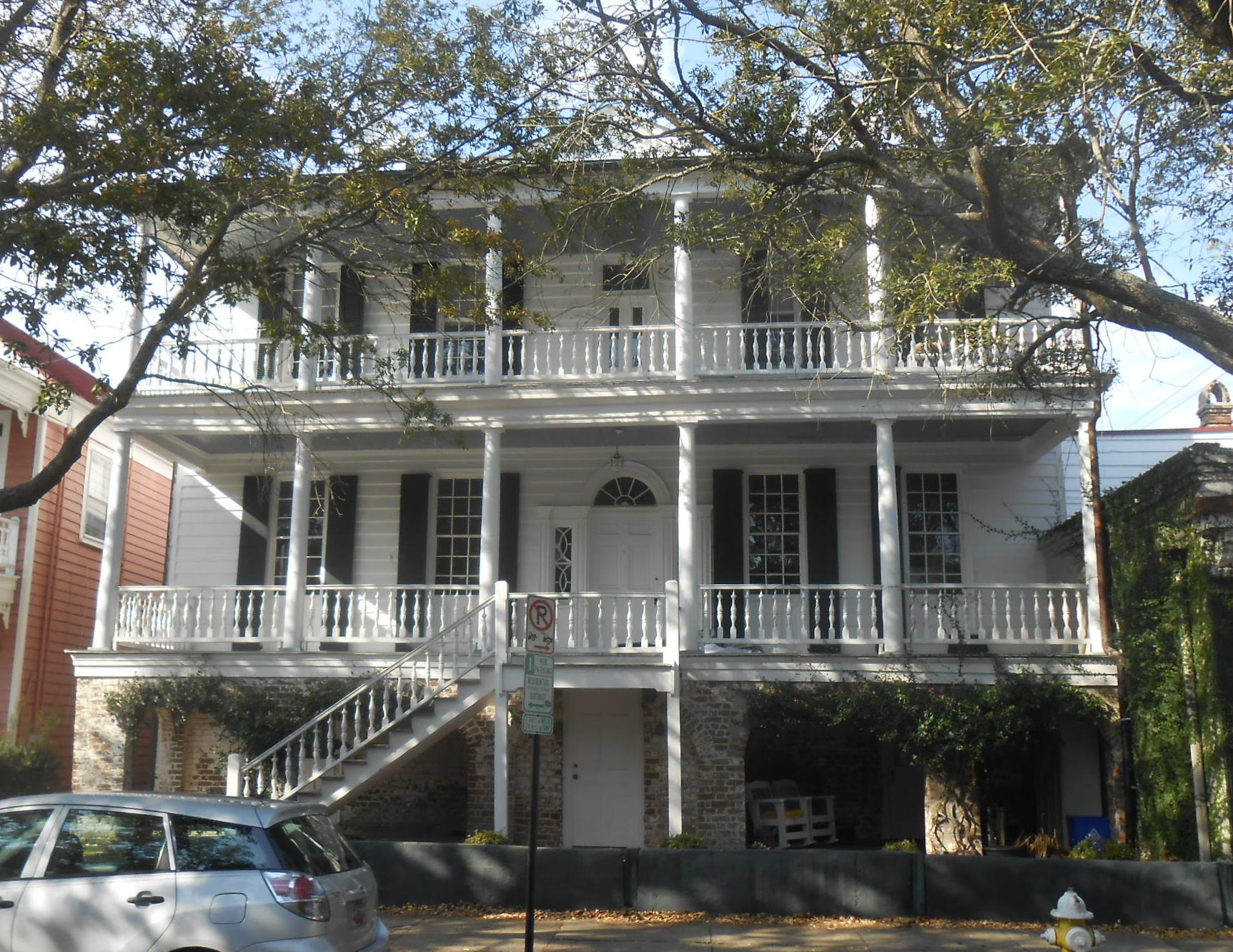
The Robert Gibbes House, 4 John St., Charleston, South Carolina

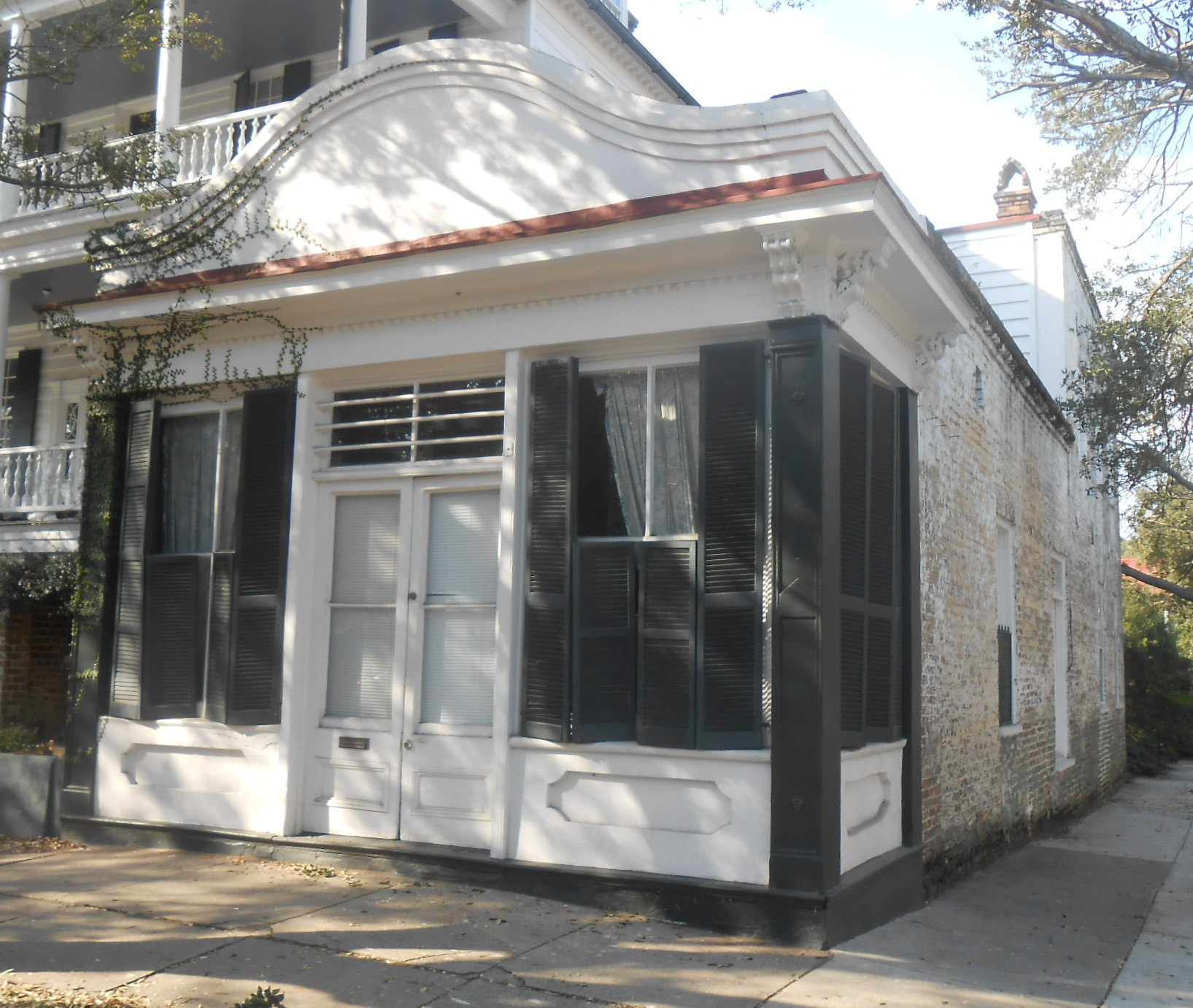
William Moran bought the property in 1863 and likely added the one-story brick store to the eastern side of the house; it appears in an 1872 map of Charleston.

The Robert Gibbes House in Charleston, South Carolina, was built in the Adamesque style at least by the time Robert Gibbes, Jr. was occupying it in 1819, perhaps earlier.

The land upon which the house was built, at the northwest corner of Elizabeth and John Streets, had belonged to William Wragg and passed to his heirs after Wragg died in 1796. The property was subsequently acquired in part by Gabriel Manigault. It is possible that Manigault, an amateur but successful architect known for his Adamesque designs, had a hand in designing the building before dying in 1809. The property was later reacquired by Robert Gibbes' family and remained in his family until 1863.

The house began a Charleston single house with two-story piazzas overlooking John Street to the south. The interior features Adamesque woodwork.
