= William Gibbs McAdoo House =

- U.S. National Register of Historic Places
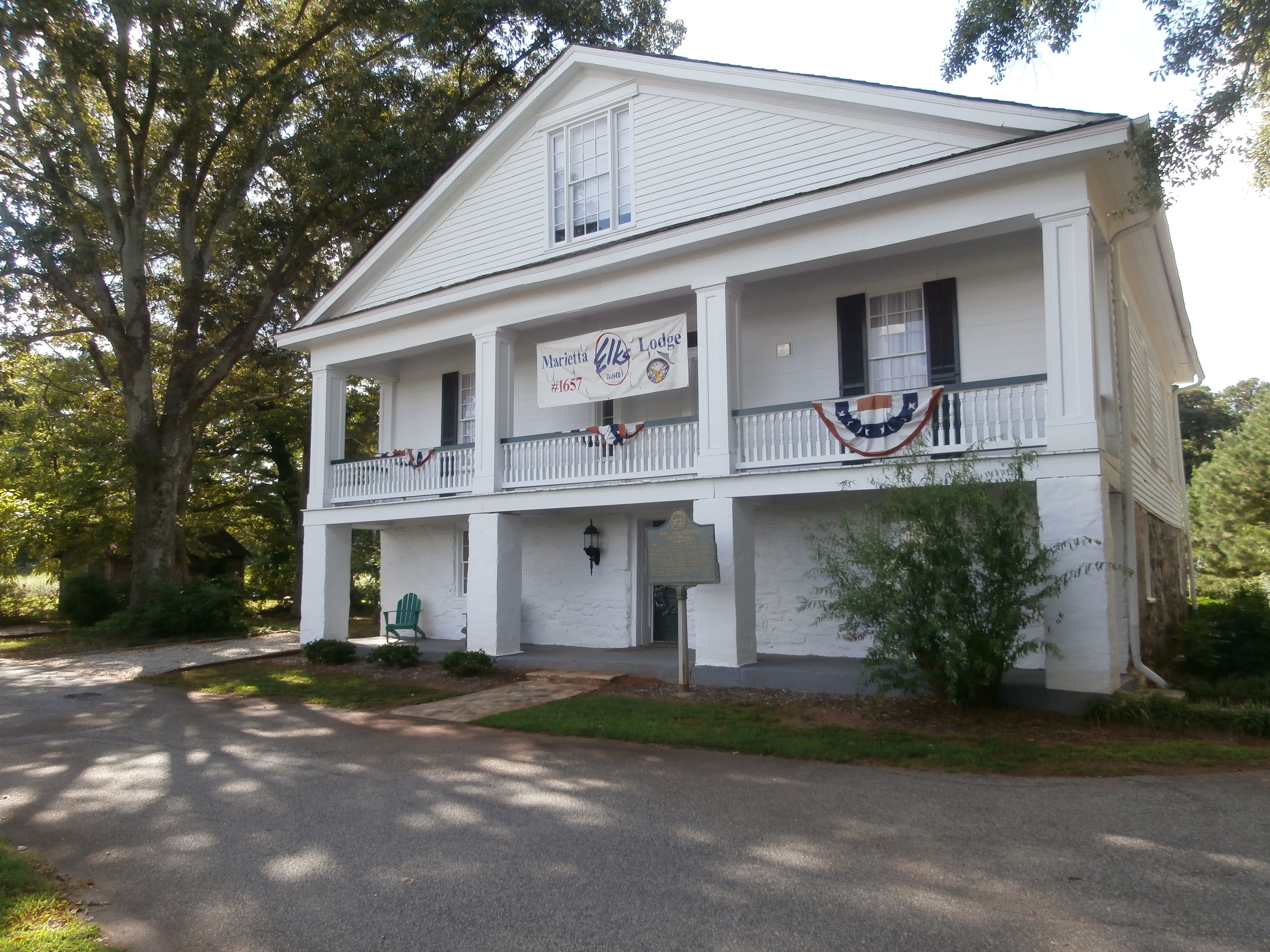

- Location within Georgia
- Nearest city: Marietta, Georgia
- Coordinates: 33°54′28″N 84°36′15″W
- Area: 12 acres (4.9 ha)
- Built: 1850
- Architectural style: Greek Revival
- NRHP reference No.: 78000975
- Added to NRHP: November 17, 1978

The William Gibbs McAdoo House is a historic house in Marietta, Georgia, U.S.. Built in the Antebellum Era, it was the birthplace of U.S. Treasury Secretary William Gibbs McAdoo, and it belonged to Georgia Governor Charles J. McDonald's daughter after the war. It is listed on the National Register of Historic Places.

== History ==
The house was built in the 1850s for Richard W. Joyner and his wife, née Lucretia Richardson. Their son, Walthall Robertson Joyner, served as the mayor of Atlanta, Georgia.

By the mid-1850s, the house belonged to Dillard M. Young, a farmer. In 1861, at the outset of the American Civil War, it was purchased by Reverend Isaac M. Springer, who turned it into a boarding school.

The house was acquired by William Gibbs McAdoo, Sr. in 1863. McAdoo lived here with his wife, née Mary Faith Floyd, who was the granddaughter of the Brigadier General John Floyd (war of 1812). Their son, William Gibbs McAdoo, who went on to serve as the 46th U.S. Secretary of the Treasury from 1913 to 1918, was born in the house.

The house was purchased by Stephen B. Oatman, an Atlanta councilman, in 1864. At the end of the war, it was sold to Confederate Colonel Alexander Smith Atkinson, who lived here with his wife, Mary Ann McDonald, the daughter of Georgia Governor Charles J. McDonald.

At the turn of the 20th century, the house was sold to A.M. Edwards, a farmer, who sold it to Johnny Walker in the 1930s.

== Architectural significance ==
The house was designed in the Greek Revival architectural style. It has been listed on the National Register of Historic Places since November 17, 1978.
