= John Gibbs House (Kalamazoo, Michigan) =

Historic house in Michigan, United States

- U.S. National Register of Historic Places
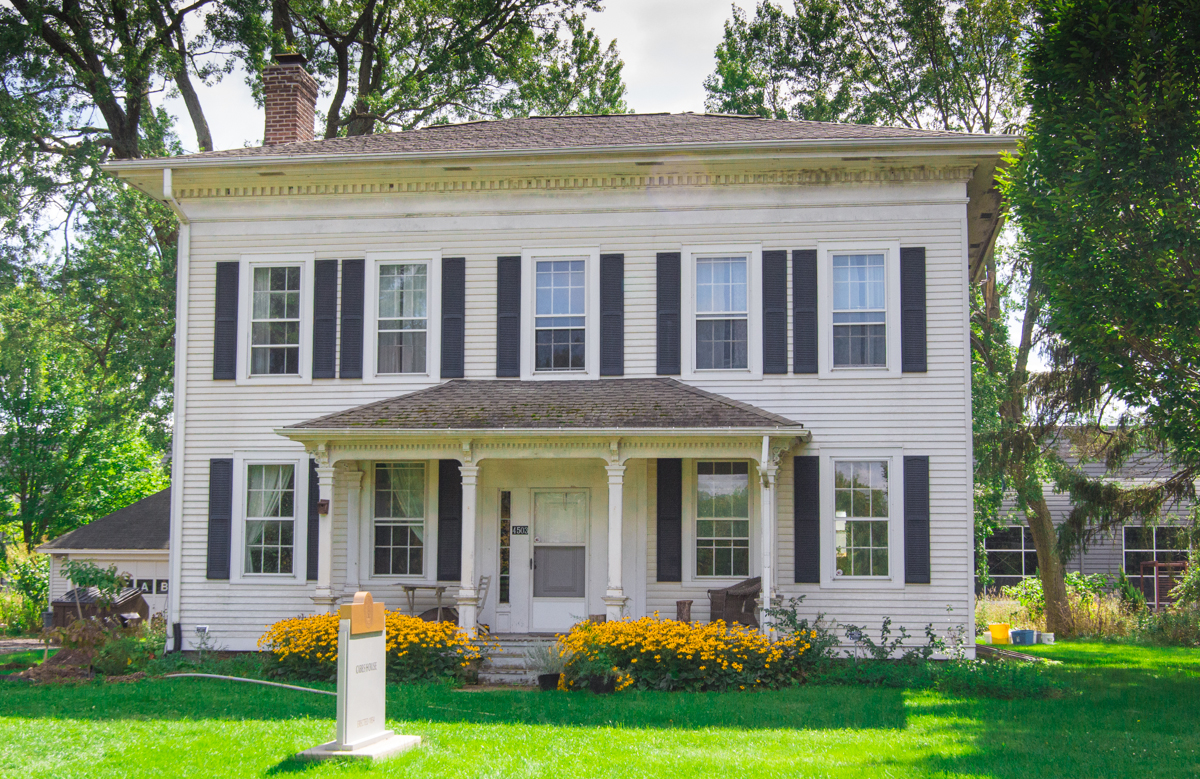

- Location within Michigan Location within the United States
- Interactive map
- Location: 4503 Parkview Avenue, Kalamazoo, Michigan
- Coordinates: 42°15′35″N 85°38′25″W
- Built: 1853
- Architectural style: Greek Revival
- MPS: Kalamazoo MRA
- NRHP reference No.: 83000858
- Added to NRHP: May 27, 1983

The John Gibbs House was built in Kalamazoo, Michigan, in 1853. The house is located on the south side of Parkview Avenue next to Western Michigan University's Business Technology and Research Park in Kalamazoo, Michigan. It was listed on the National Register of Historic Places in 1983.

== History ==
John Gibbs, a craftsman from New York, was born in 1796. He traveled to Michigan in 1832, and purchased this parcel of farmland from the United States federal government. He began farming, and was involved in local politics. He took part in the California Gold Rush in the 1850s, and likely constructed this house when he returned in about 1853. Gibbs and his wife Miranda lived in this home until Gibbs' death in 1881. Later in the nineteenth century, the Michigan Asylum for the Insane (now the Kalamazoo Regional Psychiatric Hospital) operated a cooperative farm across the street, employing the hospital's patients. The Gibbs farm was incorporated into the hospital's farming operations.

The farm and house were transferred to the university in 1959. In 1991, the development of WMU's Business Technology and Research Park was approved, which now encompasses the majority of the property. The Gibbs House is currently used for environmental research purposes by university students.

== Description ==
The John Gibbs House is a two-story, five-bay, Greek Revival with a low hip roof. It sits on a foundation finished with rounded cobblestones laid in horizontal rows. The center entrance is surrounded by a sidelight-and-pilaster front entranceway. The house has simple, six-over-six windows and a denticulated entablature. It has a small front porch which may be a later addition, or an original portion with very early Italianate influences.
