= George Gipps (MP for Ripon) =

English politician (1783–1869)

George Gipps (29 December 1783 – 26 April 1869) of Howletts, near Canterbury, Kent, was an English politician.

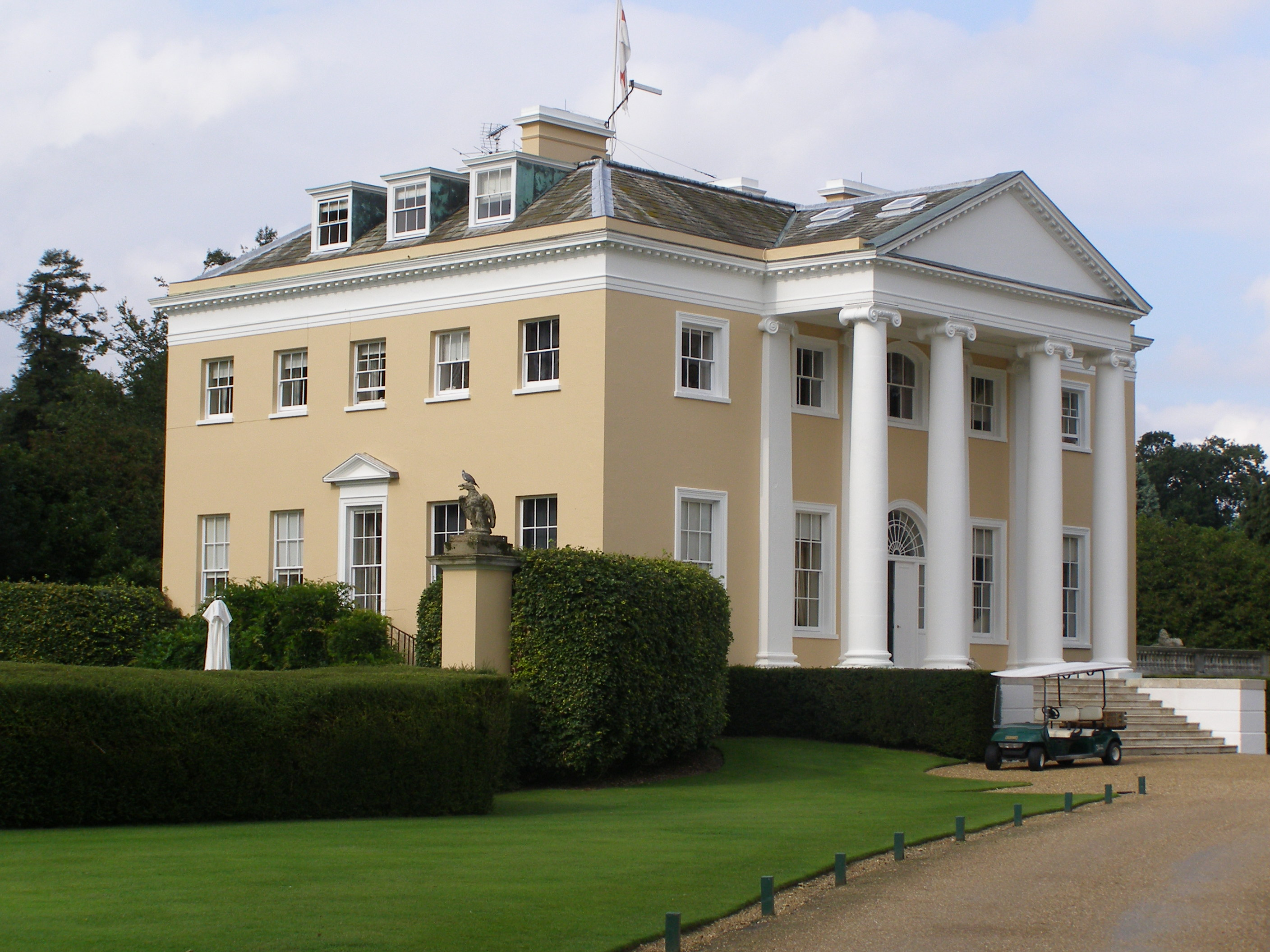
Howletts House

He was born the eldest son of George Gipps, MP of Harbledown, near Canterbury, Kent and educated at Charterhouse School (1793), St. John’s College, Cambridge (1801) and Lincoln's Inn (1805). In 1816 he purchased the recently rebuilt Howletts House, between Littlebourne and Bekesbourne, where he and his wife lived until their deaths.

He was a Member of Parliament (MP) for Ripon 1807 to 1826.

He married Jane, the daughter of John Bowdler of Hayes. He had 6 sons (3 of whom predeceased him) and 5 daughters. The residue of his estate passed to his son George.
