= Gib =

Gib or GIB may refer to:

== Places ==
- Gibraltar, British overseas territory
  - Gibraltar International Airport, IATA code GIB
  - Gibraltar national football team, FIFA code GIB
- Mount Gibraltar, known as The Gib, New South Wales, Australia
- Gibsonia, PA USA (15044), a.k.a. The GIB

== Business and organisations ==
- UK Green Investment Bank, a British financial institution
- Global Infrastructure Basel Foundation, a Swiss independent, not-for-profit foundation

== Science and technology ==
- Gibibyte, GiB, a multiple 2^{30} of the unit byte
- Gibibit, Gib, a multiple 2^{30} of the unit bit
- GPS intelligent buoys, acoustic positioning devices
- Ginsberg's Intelligent Bridgeplayer, 1998 world champion in computer bridge
- Gib, an obsolete spelling of jib, a horizontal beam used in many cranes
- Gib and cotter, a wedge used with a cotter pin

== Other uses ==
- Gibs (video gaming), fragments of a destroyed video game character
- Gib, a neutered male ferret
- Gibanawa language, ISO 639-3 code gib, a form of Hausa language
- Gib series of books by Zilpha Keatley Snyder
- AnEsonGib, British youtuber
- Gib Mihăescu, Romanian writer

== See also ==
- Jib (disambiguation)
- Gibb (disambiguation)
- Gibi-, a binary prefix meaning 1024^{3} = 2^{30}
