= 2nd Arkansas Light Artillery =

- Active: 1860–1865
- Disbanded: April 19, 1865
- Country: Confederate States of America
- Allegiance: CSA
- Branch: Volunteer Army
- Type: Artillery
- Size: battery
- Nickname: Clark County Artillery
- Engagements: American Civil War: Battle of Shiloh; Siege of Corinth; Stones River Campaign; Battle of Murfreesboro; Tullahoma Campaign; Chickamauga Campaign; Battle of Chickamauga; Chattanooga campaign; Wheeler's October 1863 Raid; Battle of Ringgold Gap; Knoxville Campaign; Battle of Bean's Station; Atlanta campaign; Second Battle of Dalton; Savannah Campaign; Carolinas campaign; Battle of Bentonville
- Website: Wiggins Battery, Arkansas Horse Artillery

Commanders
- 1860-1862: Captain Franklin Roberts
- 1862-1865: Captain Jannedens H. Wiggins
- Acting Commander 1863-1864: 1st Lieutenant J.P. Bryant
- Acting Commander 1864-1865: Lieutenant Thomas M. Ellis

The 2nd Arkansas Light Artillery (1860–1865) was a Confederate Army artillery battery which served during the American Civil War. The battery spent the majority of the war serving in Confederate forces east of the Mississippi River. The battery is also referred to as the Clark County Artillery, Robert's Arkansas Battery and Wiggins Arkansas Battery.

== Organization ==
The battery was recruited and organized in Arkadelphia, Arkansas, by Captain Franklin Roberts, a local watch maker. On December 29, 1860, militia commissions were issued to the officers of a "Volunteer Light Artillery Company" in the 28th Regiment, Arkansas State Militia. Arkansas had yet to secede from the Union so these new organizations were formed under the Arkansas Militia Law which authorized each county to form four volunteer companies, in addition to its infantry regiment. The original battery officers were:

- Captain Franklin Roberts
- 1st Lieutenant James K. Jones
- 2nd Lieutenant Charles Blackhead
- 3rd Lieutenant Richard T. Tisdale

On March 29, 1861, Colonel William M. Bruce, commander of the 28th Regiment, Arkansas State Militia, wrote to Arkansas Governor Henry Rector to report the election of officers in his regiment and to request a fife and drum set for the Clark County Artillery under Captain Frank Roberts. Adjutant General Burgevin wrote to Captain Roberts informing him of the availability of a pair of 6-pounder guns and mini rifles for his unit. is assume that this letter was written following the seizure of the Federal Arsenal at Little Rock by state militia forces.

The battery was made up mostly of Clark County men, with a few from Hot Springs County. The battery was enrolled in Confederate service at Little Rock, Arkansas, on July 15, 1863 On July 15, 1861, Confederate Brigadier General William J. Hardee arrived in Little Rock to assume unified Confederate command in the state. The following day the state Military Board signed an "Article of Transfer", which provided that all state forces (excepting the militia), would be transferred on a voluntary basis to the command of the Confederate States of America. All weapons, ammunition, and supplies were also to be transferred. The "Clarke County Artillery, Commanded by Captain Roberts" was included in the articles of transfer. The batteries enlistment documents indicate that they were enrolled into Confederate service by Adjutant General Edmond Burgevin. The battery officers when transferred to Confederate service were:

- Captain Franklin Roberts
- 1st Lieutenant Peter E. Greene
- 2nd Lieutenant William C. Adams
- 3rd Lieutenant W. T. Crouch

The new unit was initially sent to the depot at Pitman's Ferry, near Pocahontas, Arkansas. The unit is included in Brigadier General William Hardee's return of troops assigned to the Upper District of Arkansas, dated August 31, 1861, and is listed as included two officers and 85 enlisted men.

Apparently the Battery had either never received the guns promised by Adjutant General Edmond Burgevin, or the guns had been condemned by General Hardee as unserviceable. Hardee's new command was drilled and disciplined until the last of August, when Hardee's brigade marched by land to Point Pleasant, Missouri, on the Missouri River, and then traveled by steamboat to the Confederate stronghold at Columbus, Kentucky. Unlike the rest of Hardee's Brigade, Roberts Company remained at Pittman's Ferry, apparently without guns and was designated as an independent infantry company. General Hardee eventually ordered Roberts' company to join him in Kentucky as infantry but Colonel Solon Borland, placed a hold on the unit opting to instead keep them at the depot, and arm them with the discarded cannon to defend against a possible Union attack from Missouri into northeast Arkansas. On November 5, 1861, Col Borland reported:

I have a few old cannon (six and four pounders) that general Hardee pronounced as worthless and threw aside as such before he left. Besides, I have no artillery company. Captain Roberts, with about 60 men, who have some knowledge of such service, though not regularly trained, left here yesterday evening by order of, General Hardee to join him in Kentucky. I have ordered them back to take charge of these guns and do the best they can with them. I hope they will get back tomorrow night.

Colonel Borland, mentioned the unit again on November 10, 1861, in a report to General Polk:

Since my dispatch of the night of the 5th I have continued my steps of precaution and preparation for defense without intermission. Details in respect to them are at present unnecessary.

I have stopped here in passing and retain for the present Captain Roberts' company, about 60 men, nominally artillery, but without a battery, but armed and pretty well drilled as infantry, and about 150 recruits for the army, brought here by Major McCray and Captains White and Kykendall, and retained here by me, as is Captain Roberts' company; altogether about 1,286 men. Of these, owing to much sickness; casualties, necessary details for guards, nurses, &c., as you will readily apprehend, I cannon, as I have ascertained by careful examination, count on more than 600 for fighting service.

All even of these must be regarded as raw, inexperienced, and poorly disciplined, and indifferently armed. I may say that I have no artillery, for, although there are six pieces - four iron 6-pounders and two brass 4-pounders - here, they were repudiated by Gen Hardee as worthless, and are, so far as I can judge, quite so for any active or reliable service. They are so ill mounted, &c., that they cannot be used at all for flying artillery. In my destitution of such things and for this emergency, however, I shall do what I can with them by placing them in positions to cover the approaches to this place; and as Capt Roberts is the only officer here who knows anything at all about artillery, I have put him in charge of them.

The battery remained on duty in northeast Arkansas for two months, then was sent for service in east of the Mississippi River.

== Service ==
The unit moved from Pittman's Ferry to Kentucky where and joined Major General William J. Hardee's Army of Central Kentucky. After the losses of Fort Henry and Fort Donelson in February 1862, Confederate General Albert Sidney Johnston withdrew his forces into western Tennessee, northern Mississippi, and Alabama to reorganize. Then retreated through western Tennessee to northern Mississippi. The unit's muster roll for the period January 1, 1862, to February 28, 1862, stated:

Changed Station Feb 13, 1862 from Bowling Greene, Ky to Nashville. Arrived Nashville Feb 17th and ordered to proceed to Murfreesboro, where we arrived on the 23rd.

On March 29, 1862, the Army of Central Kentucky was merged into the Army of Mississippi in preparation for the Battle of Shiloh.

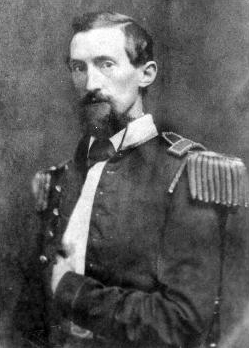
Francis Asbury Shoup Commanded Shoups Artillery Battalion, during the Battle of Shiloh, which included Clarkson's Helena Light Artillery, Trigg's Arkansas Battery, Hubbard's Jackson Light Artillery.

During the Battle of Shiloh, a.k.a. Pittsburg Landing, Tennessee, Sunday, April 6, 1862 – Monday, April 7, 1862, the battery, armed with two 6-pounder smoothbores and two 12-pounder howitzers,. was listed as unattached. The unit became involved in the largest concentration of artillery in North American up to that time. By the afternoon of Sunday, April 6, 1862, men of Prentiss's and W. H. L. Wallace's divisions had established and held a position nicknamed the Hornet's Nest. The Confederates assaulted the position for several hours rather than simply bypassing it, and they suffered heavy casualties during these assaults. It was not until the Confederates, led by Brig. Gen. Daniel Ruggles, assembled over 50 cannons, including Robert's Arkansas Battery, into a position known as "Ruggles's Battery" to blast the line at close range that they were able to surround the position, and the Hornet's Nest fell after holding out for seven hours.

In early May 1862, Confederate forces underwent an army-wide reorganization due to the passage of the Conscription Act by the Confederate Congress in April 1862. All twelve-month regiments and units had to re-muster and enlist for two additional years or the duration of the war; a new election of officers was ordered; and men who were exempted from service by age or other reasons under the Conscription Act were allowed to take a discharge and go home. Officers who did not choose to stand for re-election were also offered a discharge. The reorganization was accomplished among all the Arkansas regiments and unit in and around Corinth, Mississippi, following the Battle of Shiloh. On May 25, 1862, Captain Roberts resigned, and Jannedens H. Wiggins, who had risen from first sergeant to first lieutenant, was elected captain. The battery would hereafter be known as Wiggins' Battery, and the compiled service records of the men are filed under this designation at the National Archives.

Roberts's Arkansas Battery is listed in General P.G.T Beauregard's report of the Confederate Army of the Mississippi on May 26, 1862. The unit is assigned to Colonel Robert G. Shaver's 1st Brigade of General Hardee's 3rd Army Corps. By June 30, 1862, Robert's Battery, now under the command of Jannedens H. Wiggins, is assigned to Colonel St. John R. Liddell's brigade of General Hardee's 3rd Army Corps.

Larry Daniels, in Cannoneers in Gray: The Field Artillery of the Army of Tennessee, 1861–1865. (Tuscaloosa, AL: Fire Ant Books, 2005)., mis-identifies Trigg's Battery as the Clark County Light Artillery. This confusion was apparently caused by the transfer of several former members of Trigg's/Austin's Arkansas Battery to Roberts' Clark County Artillery following the breakup of Trigg's Battery. On July 23, 1862, a number of men from Captain Thomas M. Austin's (formerly Trigg's Arkansas Battery disbanded Arkansas light battery were assigned to the Clark County Artillery. The battery was augmented with replacements twice during the war, to replace casualties suffered. In late 1862 they received a number of replacements from the 1st Alabama Cavalry. Also during this time, the battery was apparently assigned to Montgomery's 14th Georgia Light Artillery Battalion as Company E. This assignment was apparently temporary, but a requisition signed by Lieutenant J. Wylie Callaway of Wiggins' Battery, dated 4 October 1862 refers to the organization as "Roberts' Battery, Montgomery's Battalion Georgia Artillery."

The battery did not participate in the Kentucky Campaign, from June to October, 1862. The unit's muster roll for the period July to August 1862, and again in October 1862 list the battery's station as Camp Randolph, Georgia. It appears that Roberts' Battery was transferred from Liddell's Brigade to the reserve artillery of the army at the reorganisation at Chattanooga prior to the invasion of Kentucky although no definite order to that effect can be found. Swett's Mississippi Battery was assigned to Liddell instead. The battery then became part of The Army of Middle Tennessee when that unit was organized in October 1862. It was then transferred to cavalry service und Brigadier General Nathan B. Forrest, probably in late October. Major Rice E. Graves, Chief of Artillery of Major General John C. Breckinridge's Army of Middle Tennessee, reports on 11 November 1862 that Roberts' Battery along with Freeman's Tennessee Battery had been assigned to Forrest's Cavalry Brigade. The battery at this time comprised 2 six-pounder guns and 2 12-pounder bronze howitzers. Graves also provides information on the disposition of the batteries that made up Montgomery's Battalion. Brigadier General Forrest praised the conduct of Captain J.H. Wiggins, commanding Roberts' Battery in his report of the action at Nashville on 5 November 1862. Sometime prior to The Battle of Stones River the battery was transferred from General Forrest to General Wheeler's Cavalry.

During the Battle of Stone's River, December 31, 1862, to January 2, 1863, the battery was assigned to Brigadier General Joseph Wheeler's Cavalry Brigade. During the skirmishing leading up to the battle, the battery fought as independent sections under Lieutenants J.P. Bryant, and J.W. Calloway. Lieutenant Bryan lead one gun of one section which accompanied Major General John C. Breckinridge's attack on the Union left flank on January 2, 1863.

During the Tullahoma Campaign, which followed the Confederate defeat at Stones River, the battery was assigned to Brigadier General William T. Martin's Brigade of Wheeler's Cavalry. On April 17, 1863, Brigadier General William T. Martin ordered the battery to exchange two of its old guns for new howitzers. Martin was concerned that the two guns being turned in could not be moved due to their poor condition. Captain Wiggins compiled service records contain correspondence relating to Brigadier General Martin's orders to turn in two of his guns. Wiggins reports that he had two rifled guns that had become very inaccurate due to the rifling becoming worn. He indicated that the howitzers in his battery were U.S. manufactured. Wiggins indicated that he had mounted his rifled guns on 12 lbs Howitzer carriages because these carriages required fewer horses to draw. Captain Wiggins indicated that he had been directed to obtain horses for a six gun battery and that he was in need of a forge. On April 26, 1863 Major General Gordon Granger, commanding the reserve corps indicated that Martin's Division and Wiggins Battery had moved toward Chapel Hill, Tennessee. As the Union Army of the Cumberland, commanded by Maj. Gen. William Rosecrans, maneuvered the Confederate Army of Tennessee out of its entrenchments around Shelbyville, Tennessee, on June 27, 1863, a section of the battery commanded by Captain Jannedens H. Wiggins was cut off from the main force. The section was overtaken, resulting in the capture of three artillery pieces and thirty soldiers. Twenty nine of those would remain prisoners of war until well into the summer of 1865, after the war's end, before being released in a general parole. However, Captain Wiggins was sent to an officers' prison, and was released during a prisoner exchange in the early summer of 1865, before the war ended. Thus, he was able to return to duty for the unit's last action. When Captain Wiggins was captured, command of the battery fell to 1st Lieutenant J.P. Bryant.

During the Chickamauga Campaign, the battery as assigned to Colonel Alfred A. Russell's 2nd Brigade of Brigadier General William T. Martin's division of Major General Joseph Wheeler's Cavalry Corps. Wheeler and his troopers guarded the army's left flank at Chickamauga in September 1863, and after the routed Union Army collected in Chattanooga, Gen. Bragg sent Wheeler's men into central Tennessee to destroy railroads and Federal supply lines in a major raid. On October 2 his raid at Anderson's Cross Roads (also known as Powell's Crossroads) destroyed more than 700 Union supply wagons, tightening the Confederates siege on Chattanooga. Pursued by his Union counterparts, Wheeler advanced to McMinnville and captured its 600-man garrison. There were more actions at Murfreesboro and Farmington, but by October 9 Wheeler had safely crossed the Tennessee River at Muscle Shoals, Alabama. During this raid two of Wiggin's guns had to be abandoned due to their poor condition.

The extensive raid caused the mounted arm of the army to miss the battles for Chattanooga (November 23–25). Wheeler returned from his raid in time to cover Bragg's retreat from Chattanooga following the Union breakthrough at Missionary Ridge on November 25. Wheeler's cavalry and Maj. Gen. Patrick Cleburne's infantry fought at the Battle of Ringgold Gap on November 27.

Wheeler and his men also supported Lt. Gen. James Longstreet's ultimately unsuccessful efforts during the Knoxville Campaign from November 4 to December 23, 1863. During the Knoxville Campaign, the battery was assigned to Brigadier General John T. Morgan's Division of Major General William T. Martin's Cavalry Corps. The battery was mentioned for its part in the Battle of Bean's Station, December 14, 1863, in Grainger County, Tennessee.

On April 1, 1864, Captain W.L. Scott, Chief of Artillery filed a report of light batteries in Wheeler's Cavalry Corps. Wiggins Battery is listed as belonging to Brigadier General Martin's division of Major General Wheeler's Cavalry Corps. Scott was apparently only able to report the status of one section of the battery which was stationed at Oxford Alabama and contained 44 effectives with eight absent. The section had six serviceable horses and three unserviceable animals.

On April 1, 1864, as Confederate Forces were re-organized for the Atlanta campaign, General Order No. 29 assigned Brigadier General Francis A. Shoup to command the artillery of the Army of Tennessee and Wiggin's Battery was assigned to support Wheeler's Cavalry Corps. Brigadier General Shoup divided the artillery into battalions assigned to each corps. On April 30, 1864, Wiggins Battery, now under the command of 1st Lieutenant J.P. Bryant, was assigned to Lieutenant Colonel Feliex H. Robertson's Artillery Battalion in Wheeler's Cavalry Corps. On June 30, 1864, the battery is again listed as assigned to Lieutenant Colonel Feliex H. Robertson's Artillery Battalion in Wheeler's Cavalry Corps. During the Atlanta campaign Wheeler's cavalry corps screened the flanks of the Army of Tennessee as Gen. Joseph E. Johnston drew back from several positions toward Atlanta. In July, Sherman sent two large cavalry columns to destroy the railroads supplying the defenders of Atlanta. With fewer than 5,000 cavalrymen, Wheeler defeated the enemy raids, resulting in the capture of one of the two commanding generals, Maj. Gen. George Stoneman. In August, Wheeler's corps crossed the Chattahoochee River in an attempt to destroy the railroad Sherman was using to supply his force from Chattanooga. Wheeler's men captured the town of Dalton, but he was unable to defeat the Union garrison protected in a nearby fort. Wheeler then took his men into East Tennessee, crossing the Tennessee River above Knoxville. His raid continued to the west, causing minor interruptions in the Nashville and Chattanooga Railroad and then continued south through Franklin until he re-crossed the Tennessee at Tuscumbia. Wheeler's raid was described by historian Ed Bearss as a "Confederate disaster" because it caused minimum damage to the Union while denying Gen. John Bell Hood, now in command of the Army of Tennessee, the direct support of his cavalry arm. Without accurate intelligence of Sherman's dispositions, Hood was beaten at Jonesborough and forced to evacuate Atlanta. Wheeler rendezvoused with Hood's army in early October after destroying the railroad bridge at Resaca.

In July 1864, Colonel Feliex H. Robertson demanded the discharge of 1st Lieutenant J.P. Bryant for inefficiency and incompetence. Bryant tendered his resignation on November 27, 1864, and was discharged in accordance with A.&.I.G.O. Special Order No. 291/35, dated December 8, 1864. Lieutenant Thomas M. Ellis assumed command of the battery following Bryant's discharge.

In late 1864, Wheeler's cavalry did not accompany Hood on his Franklin-Nashville Campaign back into Tennessee and was virtually the only effective Confederate force to oppose Sherman's March to the Sea to Savannah. On January 15, 1865, Colonel G.G. Dibrell, commanding the Cavalry Division, reported that he had with him Sergeant McDaniel and two guns of Wiggins Battery. When Lieutenant General William J. Hardee provided a return of his command, The Department of South Carolina, Georgia, and Florida, Wiggins' Battery, now under the command of Lieutenant Thomas M. Ellis, is listed as belonging to an artillery battalion, commanded by Major James Hamilton, in Iverson's Division of Major General Wheeler's Cavalry Corps.

Wheeler and his men continued to attempt to stop Sherman in the spring 1865 Carolinas campaign. He defeated a Union cavalry force under Brig. Gen. Judson Kilpatrick at Aiken, South Carolina, February 11. He was replaced as cavalry chief by Lt. Gen. Wade Hampton and fought under him at the Battle of Bentonville on March 19–20, 1865.

In April 1865, Captain Wiggins, recently released from his prisoner of war status, reunited with his battery, which was by this time was located in North Carolina.

== Surrender ==
On April 18, 1865, three days after the death of President Abraham Lincoln, General Joseph E. Johnston signed an armistice with General Sherman at Bennett Place, a farmhouse near Durham Station. On April 19, 1865, The 10th Michigan Cavalry was at Newton, North Carolina, paroling prisoners. 11 men, including Captain Wiggins were paroled at Newton, North Carolina, on April 19, 1865. Of the just over 160 men that had served in the battery from the beginning of the war, only 11 remained at the time of their surrender. Sherman got himself into political hot water by offering terms of surrender to Johnston that encompassed political issues as well as military, without authorization from General Grant or the United States government. The confusion on this issue lasted until April 26, when Johnston agreed to purely military terms and formally surrendered his army and all Confederate forces in the Carolinas, Georgia, and Florida.

== See also ==
- List of Confederate units from Arkansas
- Confederate Units by State
