= Trigg's Arkansas Battery =

- Active: 1861–1862
- Disbanded: July 23, 1862
- Country: Confederate States
- Allegiance: Arkansas
- Branch: Confederate States Army
- Role: Artillery
- Size: battery
- Nickname: Austin Artillery
- Engagements: Battle of Shiloh

Commanders
- 1861-1862: Captain John T. Trigg
- 1862: Captain Thomas M. Austin

Trigg's Arkansas Battery (1861–1862) was a Confederate Army artillery battery during the American Civil War. the unit is also known as the Austin Artillery, Auston's Artillery, Austin's Artillery, and Company B, of Shoup's Artillery Battalion. This battery is distinguished from a later organization, the 9th Arkansas Field Battery, which was also commanded by Captain John T. Trigg.

== Organization ==
John T. Trigg was an attorney, railroad agent and politician. His sister Frances married Edmund Burgevin, who became the Adjutant General of Arkansas in 1861. His half-brother was Arkansas Governor Henry Rector. He first entered service as an enlisted member of the Pulaski Light Artillery, a military battery from Little Rock. He was paid for service in the battery, April 20–30, 1861 when the battery was sent as part of a militia battalion led by Colonel Solon Borland to seize the Federal post at Fort Smith, Arkansas. The unit returned to Little Rock in time to fire the salute celebrating Arkansas's secession from the Union on May 6, 1861. Trigg received a Militia Commission as captain of a volunteer artillery company of the 13th Militia Regiment of Pulaski County on May 22, 1861. The other officers listed in the battery are:

- Hart Baswell 1st LT
- E. J. Thurston 2nd LT
- A. B. Trigg, 3rd LT.

Trigg's Battery first moved to Pittman's Ferry, near Pocahontas, in northeast Arkansas. On July 14, 1861, Confederate Brigadier General William J. Hardee arrived in Little Rock to assume unified Confederate command in the state. The following day the state Military Board signed an "Article of Transfer", which provided that all state forces would be transferred on a voluntary basis to the command of the Confederate States of America. The Articles of Transfer included Major Francis A. Shoup's battalion of artillery;

Company A, Captain A. W. Clarkson's Helena Light Artillery,
Company B, Captain John T. Trigg's battery; and
Company C, Captain George T. Hubbard's Jackson Light Artillery.

Many Confederate artillery units seem to have begun the war named for the city or county that sponsored their organization. In the Official Records of the Union and Confederate Armies, artillery units are most often referred to by the name of their battery commander. During the war, efforts were made to organize artillery units into battalions and regiments, but the battalions seldom functioned as a consolidated organization, in fact batteries were often broken out and fought as one or two gun sections. Shoup's battalion would be an exception to this rule.

== Service ==
The battery, as part of Shoup's Battalion moved to central Kentucky with Hardee's forces. Major Shoup's battalion was associated with Brigadier General Patrick Cleburne's brigade when it moved into Kentucky and remained so until after the battle of Shiloh. The Battalion was in the retreat from Bowling Green to Corinth, Mississippi, following the fall of Forts Donelson and Henry.

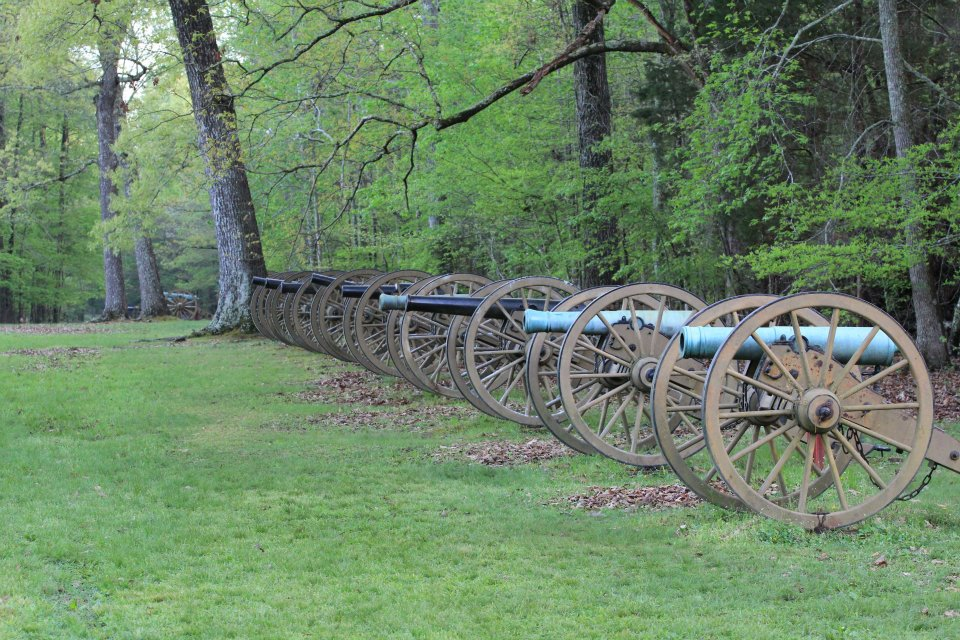
Ruggles' Battery, specifically the position occupied by Shoup's Arkansas Artillery Battalion at Shiloh National Military Park

During the Battle of Shiloh, a.k.a. Pittsburg Landing, Tennessee, Sunday, April 6, 1862 – Monday, April 7, 1862, the battery, armed with two 6-pounder smoothbores and two 12-pounder howitzers was assigned with the rest of Shoup's battalion to General Patrick Cleburne's 2nd Brigade of Major General William J. Hardee Corps. Major Shoup was serving and Major General Hardee's Chief of Artillery. By the afternoon of Sunday, April 6, 1862, men of Brig. Gens. Benjamin M. Prentiss's and W. H. L. Wallace's Union divisions had established and held a position nicknamed the Hornet's Nest. The Confederates assaulted the position for several hours rather than simply bypassing it, and they suffered heavy casualties during these assaults. The Confederates, led by Brig. Gen. Daniel Ruggles, assembled a 'grand battery' of over 50 cannons, including Trigg's Arkansas Battery into a position known as "Ruggles' Battery". Some controversy exists as to who exactly gave the order to concentrate artillery at this point. It has gone down in history as "Ruggle's Battery" but Major Shoup also claimed the credit. Other sources indicate that Brig. Genl. James Trudeau began the concentration after orders from Beauregard. National Park Service tablets at the Shiloh National Military Park use the "Ruggle's Battery" designation. This concentration originated about 3:00 pm when General Beauregard was informed of the death of General Albert S. Johnston thereby making Beauregard the army commander. He immediately moved to push the stalled rebel attack by assigning General Braxton Bragg to command in the eastern sector of the battlefield and General Ruggles to command in the center of the battlefield, the Duncan field sector. Ruggles issued orders to gather the artillery into a group which historians now believe totaled 55 guns. Major Francis Shoup also claims a portion of the credit for this grouping which came about because Shoup and Ruggles were unaware of the other being present. There were actually two groups of guns in Ruggle's Grand Battery, the northern group and the southern group. The northern group contained the batteries located by aides of General Ruggles and brought to the field. This group is the group formed by Ruggles. The southern group was commanded by Major Shoup and contained a group of batteries who had been under Shoup"s supervision and had been resting following the morning fight near the main Corinth Road. The northern group, commanded by Captain Bankhead included a section of Ketchum's Alabama battery 2 guns, Hodgson's Louisiana battery 6 guns, Bankhead's Tennessee battery 6 guns, Stanford's Mississippi battery 6 guns, Robertson's Alabama battery, 4 guns for a total of 30 guns. The southern group of guns, commanded by Major Shoup included Roberts Arkansas battery 4 guns, Triggs Arkansas battery 4 guns, Sweet's Mississippi battery 6 guns, a section of Hubbard's Arkansas battery (Lt Thrall commanding) 2 guns, Brynes Kentucky battery, 7 guns and a section of Cobb's Kentucky Battery, 2 guns, for a total of 25 guns. The guns of these two groups came from different areas of the battlefield. It appears that Shoup was not initially aware of the presence of the northern group of guns or Ruggles' orders to gather the guns. The resulting artillery concentration of 55 guns was, up to that time, the largest concentration of artillery ever on the North American continent and was itself a historical event. This status did not last long as it was quickly surpassed by even larger artillery concentrations in the Eastern Theater of the war. The grand battery enabled Confederates to surround the position, and the Hornet's Nest fell after holding out for seven hours.

In early May 1862, Confederate forces underwent an army-wide reorganization due to the passage of the Conscription Act by the Confederate Congress in April 1862. All twelve-month units had to re-muster and enlist for two additional years or the duration of the war; a new election of officers was ordered; and men who were exempted from service by age or other reasons under the Conscription Act were allowed to take a discharge and go home. Officers who did not choose to stand for re-election were also offered a discharge. The reorganization was accomplished among all the Arkansas units in and around Corinth, Mississippi, following the Battle of Shiloh. Several Arkansas Officers, such as Colonel Robert G. Shaver and Colonel Dandridge McCrae chose not to stand for re-election and instead choose to return to Arkansas and raise new units. Some of these officers choose to follow Major General Thomas C. Hindman, who was appointed in May 1862 to assume command of the new Department of the Trans-Mississippi. It is not clear if Captain John Trigg chose to resign at this point or if he was defeated in the re-organization, but he drops out of sight in the Army of Mississippi at about the time of the reorganization.

Trigg's Arkansas Battery is listed in General P.G.T Beauregard's report of the Confederate Army of the Mississippi on May 26, 1862. The unit is assigned to Brigadier General Patrick Cleburne's 2nd Brigade of General Hardee's 3rd Army Corps. By June 30, 1862, Trigg's Battery, now under the command of Thomas M. Austin and listed as Austin's Arkansas Artillery is assigned to a brigade commanded by Colonel Alexander T. Hawthorn. Hawthorn's Brigade had been created from units regiments drawn from the other brigades of the Hardee's Corps and included Austin's Battery. Hawthorn's Brigade was short lived as he departed to serve in the Trans-Mississippi and the brigade was broken up at the end of July 1862, Austin's Battery being disbanded at the same time.

== Disbanded ==
The exact date and reasons for the disbanding of Trigg's/Austin's battery is unclear. It is clear that Captain Thomas M. Austin signed a receipt on July 23, 1862 delivering the battery's guns and equipment to Darden's Jefferson Mississippi Battery. It appears that approximately thirty of the unit's personnel were reassigned either to Darden's Battery, with others, including several officers, being reassigned to Robert's Arkansas Battery, also known as Wiggin's battery or the 2nd Arkansas Light Artillery. Captain Austin returned to the ranks in Key's Helena Artillery, eventually rising back to the rank of Second Lieutenant. Captain Trigg does not appear to have immediately returned to service in Arkansas. Unlike other senior Arkansas leaders of the Army of Mississippi who returned to Arkansas in the summer of 1862 helping General Hindman organize a new Army, Trigg is not mentioned again in military service until a September 1863 order that directs him and his company to joint General Sterling Price's Division. The reason for this disappearance may have been bad relations with General Hindman. There was a great deal of animosity between General Hindman and Arkansas Governor Rector relating to events surrounding the mobilization of Arkansas forces in the summer of 1862. General Hindman arrived back in Little Rock in late May 1862 and found that Governor Rector had fled with the state government to Hot Springs. Hindman would implement martial law in Arkansas, which resulted in complaints from Governor Rector to Confederate President Jefferson Davis. Trigg, who was a half brother to and former law partner of Governor Rector would have ample reason to lie low until Hindman was transferred back east of the Mississippi River in Spring of 1863.

== Confusion over naming ==
Larry Daniels, in Cannoneers in Gray: The Field Artillery of the Army of Tennessee, 1861–1865. (Tuscaloosa, AL: Fire Ant Books, 2005)., lists Trigg's Battery as the Clark County Light Artillery. This confusion was apparently caused by the transfer of several former members of Trigg's Arkansas Battery to Roberts' Clark County Artillery following the break up of Trigg's Battery. Other histories have identified Trigg's unit as "The Austin Artillery" or "Auston's Artillery". It does not appear that Trigg's battery was ever referred to as "the Austin Artillery" while Captain Trigg was in command. This confusion is apparently caused by the short tour of command by Captain Thomas M. Austin. Additional confusion was caused by the fact that when members of Trigg's/Austin's Battery were transferred to Darden's Mississippi Battery, the compiliers of the Compiled Service Records recorded Austin's name as Auston. The unit is also confused by some as being the same battery that became the 9th Arkansas Field Battery, because Captain John Trigg also commanded that organization. It appears that John Trigg himself is the only connection between these two units.

== See also ==
- List of Confederate units from Arkansas
- Confederate Units by State
