= General Shoup =

General Shoup may refer to:

- Francis Asbury Shoup, Confederate general in the American Civil War
- David M. Shoup, U.S. Marine Corps. general
