= Johnston's River Line =

- Johnston's Line
- U.S. National Register of Historic Places
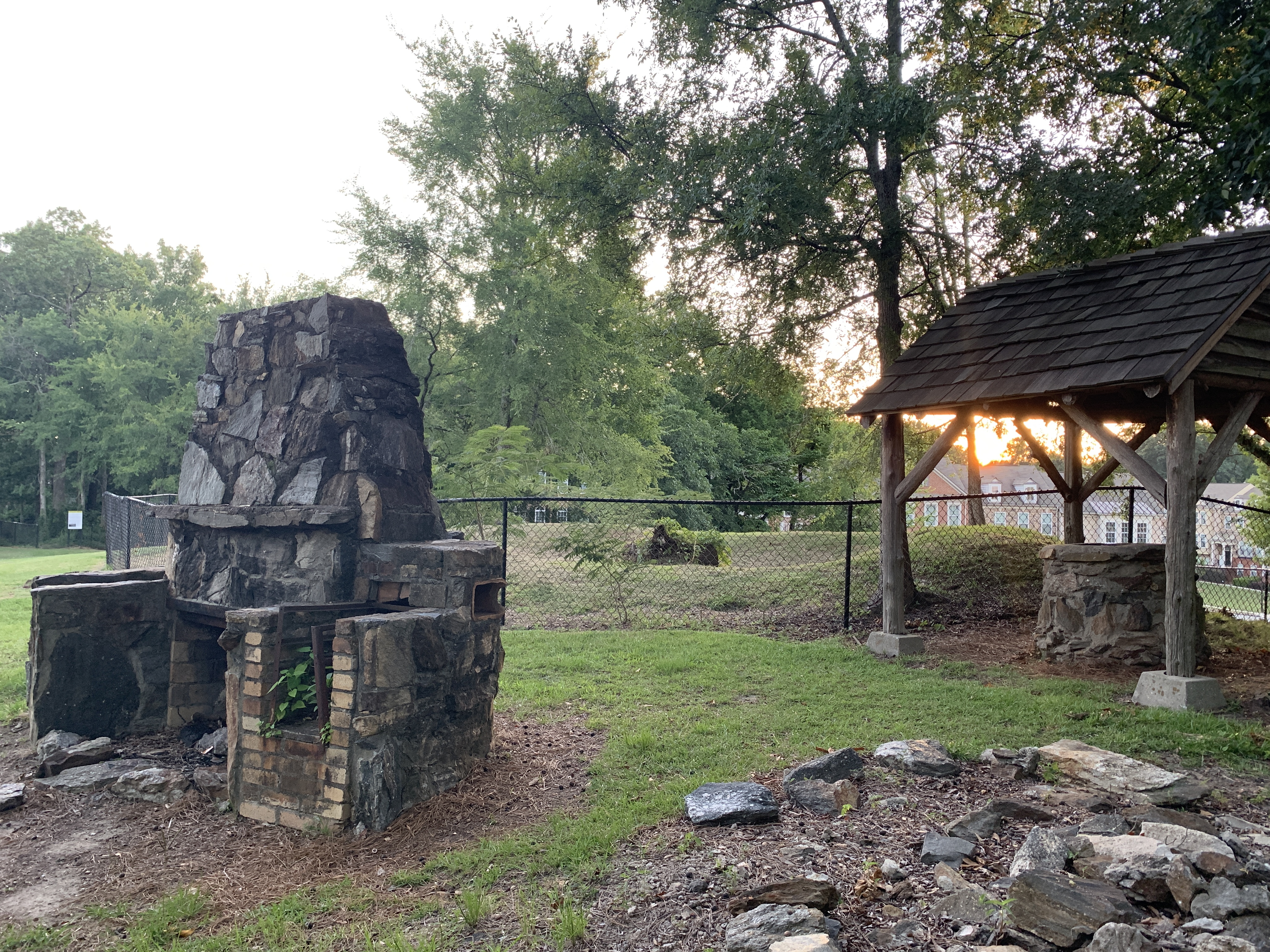
- Shoupade Park in Smyrna, Georgia, July 2022. A Shoupade can be seen in the fenced area. This was part of Johnston’s Line.

- Location within Georgia Location within the United States
- Nearest city: Mableton, Georgia
- Coordinates: 33.7919°N 84.523°W
- Area: 13.1 acres (5.3 ha)
- Built: 1864
- NRHP reference No.: 73000618
- Added to NRHP: July 5, 1973

Johnston's River Line, also called Johnston's Line, the Chattahoochee River Line or simply The River Line, is a historic American Civil War defensive line located in the communities of Mableton, Smyrna, and Vinings, Georgia that was used by the Confederate Army under General Joseph E. Johnston during the Atlanta campaign in early July 1864. While no significant battles took place along the River Line, it remains one of the most impressive defensive fortifications ever constructed, often compared to the French Maginot Line built prior to World War II. Part of the River Line Historic Area and the Chattahoochee River Line Battlefield, the site today consists of the remains of Confederate earthwork battlements including unique fortifications called Shoupades, named after their designer, Confederate Brig. General Francis A. Shoup. The remains are spread across a six to seven mile stretch along the northwest side of the Chattahoochee River from a point just north of where Nickajack Creek joins the Chattahoochee in Mableton to north of S. Atlanta Road in Smyrna/Vinings. It was added to the National Register of Historic Places on July 5, 1973. Although many of the remains are on private property, visitors can access the site off U.S. 78 in Mableton, and off S.R. 280 and S. Atlanta Rd in Smyrna/Vinings. The site's coordinates are 33°47′31″N 84°31′23″W.

== History ==
From the beginning of the Atlanta Campaign in May 1864, the Union Army under the command of General William T. Sherman had managed to out-maneuver Confederate General Joseph E. Johnston's Army of Tennessee throughout Northwest Georgia forcing them to fall back to a defensive position at Kennesaw Mountain in late June. Johnston saw the nearby Chattahoochee River as the largest natural boundary between his army and the city of Atlanta. He had already dispatched a hundred men to protect the Western & Atlantic Railroad bridge that crossed the river near the community of Bolton. Johnston feared the loss of thousands of men should Sherman's Army attack the Confederates during a retreat across the river. He also knew this would likely be the location of a final "last stand" in the defense of Atlanta.

On June 18, 1864, roughly a week before the Battle of Kennesaw Mountain, Johnston was approached by his Artillery Commander, Brig. General Francis A. Shoup, about the construction of a defensive line high atop a ridge along the northwest bank of the Chattahoochee River to which the Confederate Army could withdraw should Sherman continue his pattern of flanking maneuvers. Shoup envisioned a line of such strength as to deter any direct assault and such efficiency as to require a mere fraction of Johnston's men to hold while the majority could defend the Chattahoochee against an attempted Federal bridgehead. Johnston approved Shoup's proposal and work began the next day.

Construction of what was first called the Chattahoochee River Line started on June 19 and would take about two weeks requiring a labor force of both convalescing soldiers from nearby hospitals and over one thousand impressed slaves. While some trenches existed near the state railroad bridge that could be expanded and lengthened, most of the line would be built from scratch. Shoup's design consisted of a series of arrowhead-shaped infantry forts—36 in total were built—spaced sixty to 175 yards apart and connected by trenches broken every thirty to 75 yards by artillery redans that would house two artillery pieces. Each fort consisted of an earthen foundation with log walls or parapets extending fourteen to twenty feet high depending on the terrain. Interior earthen walls would stop short of the log exterior walls forming a platform on which infantrymen could fire over top the fort. At the rear or base of the fort and behind the line would be an entrance or sally port. From above, the line would look like a saw blade with the trenches connecting the forts receding at a backward angle to each redan and then at a forward angle to the next fort creating what Shoup called a re-entrant. Along the front of the trenches would be walls or palisades made of stockades. Each fort could hold up to eighty men. Soldiers within the forts could load rifles and hand them up to riflemen on the earthen platforms who would provide interlocking fields of fire channeling an attacking force towards the re-entrant formed by the receding trenches where artillery fire from the redans would sweep the ground. If all the forts were manned at once, the River Line would prove to be a quite formidable opponent.

About a week into the River Line's construction, Johnston, fearing another maneuver by the Union Army around his left flank, ordered a reluctant Shoup to extend the southwestern end of the line to a position covering the Mayson-Turner Ferry across the Chattahoochee. By the time Confederate troops began falling back to a temporary line in Smyrna on July 3 following the Battle of Kennesaw Mountain on June 27, most of what would now be called Johnston's River Line had been completed. When the first Confederate soldiers arrived at the River Line on the evening of July 4, many, including Lt. General John B. Hood, were skeptical of its design and even began modifying it into something more conventional. Maj. General Patrick Cleburne, however, judged the works to be excellent, and Maj. General Gustavus W. Smith remarked that the design would make Shoup famous even naming the forts "Shoupades." As Johnston had predicted, when Sherman first learned of the Confederates' retreat to a line within several miles of the Chattahoochee River, he impressed upon his commanders "the importance of the most intense energy of attack...at any cost of life and material." He was convinced that Johnston took up this position only in hope of delaying Federal pursuit. No general, Sherman told one of his officers, would invite battle with the Chattahoochee behind him. Upon first observing the River Line himself the morning of July 5 from a Vinings hilltop, however, Sherman sent a wire to Washington saying he would have to "study the case a little" before proceeding. Finding the area still occupied with a Confederate Army more than prepared for a repetition of the events a week prior, he deemed it "the best line of field entrenchments [he had] ever seen." His chief engineer, Captain Orlando M. Poe, reported that the line "was by far the strongest [he] had yet encountered" and that "it would cost many lives to carry the position by assault." It wouldn't take Sherman long to revert to his time-tested method of attempting to maneuver rather than attack.

Although Federal troops constructed both trenches and battery positions opposing Johnston's River Line, General Sherman had no intention of a direct assault—especially following his underestimation of Johnston's defensive position at Kennesaw Mountain. While half the Federal forces would eventually be positioned in front of the River Line, nothing more than a few daily artillery duels would take place. In contrast with his pattern of maneuvering around Johnston's left flank, Sherman sent divisions north to find a crossing around the right flank of the River Line. By July 8 and 9, Union troops led by Brig. General Kenner Garrard and Maj. General John M. Schofield had secured crossings near Sope Creek and Roswell. Despite his claim that the position could be held for a month, Johnston had little choice but to abandon the River Line on the evening of July 9. This failure would lead to his dismissal from command by President of the Confederacy Jefferson Davis.

Shoup was devastated by the abandonment of his novel defensive system and lamented, "I took a long look at the works into which my heart had gone to such a degree and felt that the days of the Confederacy were numbered. I made good all I proposed...the line...could have been held by three thousand men for any reasonable time against a hundred thousand."

== The River Line today ==
As late as the 1950s, a person could walk the length of the River Line. Today, very little remains accessible as a result of commercial and residential development.

While 36 Shoupades were originally constructed along the River Line, only nine remain in the form of earthwork foundations mostly covered by overgrowth. Only one exists on publicly owned land—a 100-acre (40 ha) parcel along the Chattahoochee River south of U.S. 78 in Mableton—bought by Cobb County that also includes dozens of yards of infantry trench and a fort, all of which anchored the southwestern end of the River Line. Unfortunately, none of this land is easily accessible to the public. Three Shoupades and an artillery redan, while on private property, have been preserved by developers and can be accessed by the public. Two of the three Shoupades and the redan are partially enclosed by a fence installed by a residential developer who agreed to preserve the site and turn it into what is now called Shoupade Park in Smyrna, complete with interpretive signs. Five Shoupades in total originally existed within a half mile of the park, however two were destroyed by homeowners seeking to reuse the land for other purposes or preserve its value for future sale and development. The only other Shoupade that has been preserved and can be easily accessed is located in Mableton behind River Line Park. While the park is publicly owned, the Shoupade is on privately owned land that is part of a residential development bordering the park. This developer also agreed to preserve the Shoupade and install a fence and interpretive sign. The remaining Shoupades and many yards of infantry trench, both Confederate and Federal, still exist but are on private property buried within neighborhoods or along steep or inaccessible terrain.

Other historic sites related to the River Line include the Howell Mill Dam, Hooper-Turner House, Turner-Sewell Cemetery and the Log Cabin Community Sunday School. The Howell Mill Dam is located in Mableton along Nickajack Creek on land purchased by Cobb County in 2006. Just upstream of the site where the mill once stood, the dam has yet to be made accessible to the public. Located just north of River Line Park, the Hooper-Turner House is an antebellum "hall and parlor" style home built in the 1850s and once owned by two of Cobb County's pioneering families, the Thomas Hooper family and the John R. Turner family—the latter of whom operated the Mayson-Turner Ferry that crossed the Chattahoochee River at today's U.S. 78. The house is presently owned by the city of Smyrna and, although listed on the Cobb County Historic Register, has been slated for demolition. The Turner-Sewell Cemetery is about a mile south of the Hooper-Turner House and is the final resting place of John Turner, his wife Jane and other members of the associated Sewell family. The Log Cabin Community Sunday School was built in the early 1900s in Vinings and was preserved by what is now Log Cabin Community Church.

== See also ==
- National Register of Historic Places listings in Cobb County, Georgia
