= Helena Artillery =

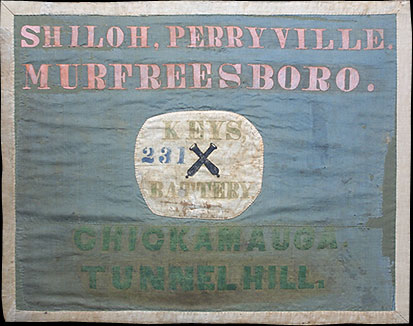
- Key's Battery flag
- Active: 1861–1865
- Country: Confederate States of America
- Allegiance: Confederate States Army
- Branch: Artillery
- Engagements: American Civil War: Battle of Shiloh; Siege of Corinth; Kentucky Campaign; Battle of Perryville; Battle of Murfreesboro; Tullahoma Campaign; Battle of Liberty Gap; Chickamauga Campaign; Battle of Chickamauga; Chattanooga campaign; Atlanta campaign; Battle of Pickett's Mill; Battle of Kennesaw Mountain; Battle of Jonesboro; Siege of Atlanta; Franklin–Nashville Campaign; Battle of Nashville

Commanders
- 1861-1862: Captain A. W. Clarkson
- 1862: Captain John H. Calvert
- 1862-1865: Captain Thomas J. Key

The Helena Artillery (1861–1865) was a Confederate Army artillery battery during the American Civil War. The unit was known by several other designations during the war including Clarkson's Battery, Company A, Shoup's Artillery Battalion, Calvert's Battery, and Key's Battery. The unit was occasionally assigned to artillery battalions from other states, so the Arkansas unit was at various times designated as Company C, 20th Alabama Light Artillery Battalion and later as Company H, 28th Georgia Artillery Battalion.

== Organization ==
The unit was organized on 27 April 1862 at Helena, in Phillips County Arkansas, and enrolled in State service two days later. Governor Henry Rector had called parts of the Arkansas State Militia into state service following the Confederate firing on Fort Sumter, but before the state had formally succeeded from the Union. Governor Rector dispatched a battalion of militia from Little Rock to seize the Federal installation at Fort Smith, and ordered units on the eastern side of the state to rendezvous at Mound City (near present-day West Memphis, Arkansas). There are no records of the unit being organized in the Arkansas State Militia before it was inducted into state service. Many of the enlistments in the battery appear to have been from the Irish immigrants who worked in the dockyard at Helena. Approximately 50 of the names of the battery appear to be of Irish nationality. As the war progressed, the battery was replenished with transfers from other Arkansas units with in Cleburne's command and by conscripts from states east of the Mississippi river, including Alabama, Georgia, Mississippi and Tennessee.

The original battery officers were:

- Captain A. W. Clarkson
- Senior 1st Lieutenant John H. Calvert
- Junior 1st Lieutenant James Hamilton and
- 2nd Lieutenant Robert Fitzpatrick

Many Confederate artillery units seem to have begun the war named for the city or county that sponsored their organization. In the Official Records of the Union and Confederate Armies, artillery units are most often referred to by the name of their battery commander. After Capt Clarkson, the Helena Light Artillery was commanded by Capt John H. Calvert and Capt Thomas J. Key. The battery would retain a close association with Patrick Cleburne throughout the war. 1st Lieutenant Calvert, who would assume command of the battery after the battle of Shiloh, had been a Sergeant in the United States Army prior to the war and had been a drill instructor for Cleburne's militia company before secession.

== Service ==
By 7 May 1862, the battery, along with the companies that would eventually comprise Col Patrick Cleburne's 1st Regiment, Arkansas State Troops (Later re-designated as the 15th Arkansas Infantry Regiment was encamped at "Camp Rector" near Memphis.) The battery spent three months in states service before being inducted into Confederate Service. During this time the battery moved east of the Mississippi River with the rest of Col Cleburne's forces and cooperated in an effort to defend the Mississippi river in an operation that would lead to the construction of Fort Pillow north of Memphis. During this expedition, the battery was inducted into Confederate service on 6 July 1861 at Memphis Tennessee. The battery would re-cross the river and accompany Cleburne's command on its move to Pitman's Ferry, near Pocahontas in Randolph County and was assigned to a brigade commanded by Confederate General William J. Hardee. On July 14, 1861, Brigadier General Hardee arrived in Little Rock to assume unified Confederate command in the state. The following day the state Military Board signed an "Article of Transfer", which provided that all state forces would be transferred on a voluntary basis to the command of the Confederate States of America. The Articles of Transfer included Major Francis A. Shoup's battalion of artillery;.

Company A, Captain Clarkson's Helena Light Artillery,
Company B, Captain John T. Trigg's Arkansas Battery; and
Company C, Captain George T. Hubbard's Jackson Light Artillery.

During the war, efforts were made to organize artillery units into battalions and regiments, but the battalions seldom functioned as a consolidated organization, in fact batteries were often broken out and fought as one or two gun sections. Shoup's battalion would be an exception to this rule.

=== Shiloh ===
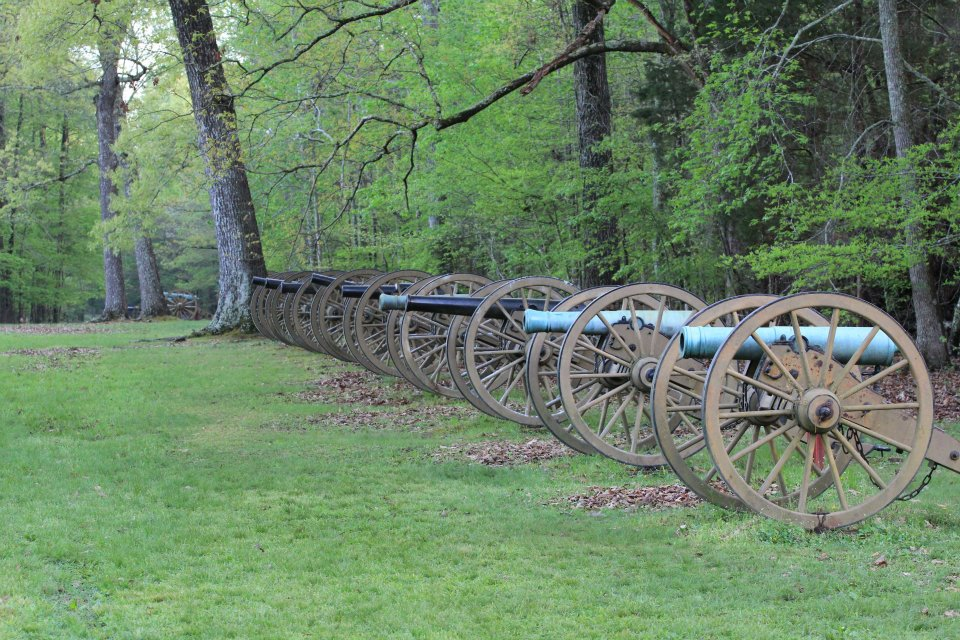
Ruggles' Battery at Shiloh National Military Park

During the Battle of Shiloh, a.k.a. Pittsburg Landing, Tennessee, Sunday, April 6, 1862 – Monday, April 7, 1862, the battery, armed with two 6-pounder smoothbores and two 12-pounder howitzers was assigned with the rest of Shoup's battalion to General Patrick Cleburne's 2nd Brigade of Major General William J. Hardee Corps. Major Shoup was serving as Major General Hardee's Chief of Artillery. By the afternoon of Sunday, April 6, 1862, men of Brig. Gens. Benjamin M. Prentiss's and W. H. L. Wallace's Union divisions had established and held a position nicknamed the Hornet's Nest. The Confederates assaulted the position for several hours rather than simply bypassing it, and they suffered heavy casualties during these assaults. The Confederates, led by Brig. Gen. Daniel Ruggles, assembled a 'grand battery' of over 50 cannons, including Trigg's Arkansas Battery into a position known as "Ruggles' Battery". Some controversy exists as to who exactly gave the order to concentrate artillery at this point. It has gone down in history as "Ruggle's Battery" but Major Shoup also claimed the credit. Other sources indicate that Brig. Genl. James Trudeau began the concentration after orders from Beauregard. National Park Service tablets at the Shiloh National Military Park use the "Ruggle's Battery" designation. This concentration originated about 3:00 pm when General Beauregard was informed of the death of General Albert S. Johnston thereby making Beauregard the army commander. He immediately moved to push the stalled rebel attack by assigning General Braxton Bragg to command in the eastern sector of the battlefield and General Ruggles to command in the center of the battlefield, the Duncan field sector. Ruggles issued orders to gather the artillery into a group which historians now believe totaled 55 guns. Major Francis Shoup also claims a portion of the credit for this grouping. There were actually two groups of guns in Ruggle's Grand Battery, a northern group and a southern group. The northern group contained the batteries located by aides of General Ruggles and brought to the field and this group was the group formed by Ruggles. The northern group, commanded by Captain Bankhead included a section of Ketchum's Alabama battery 2 guns, Hodgson's Louisiana battery 6 guns, Bankhead's Tennessee battery 6 guns, Stanford's Mississippi battery 6 guns, Robertson's Alabama battery, 4 guns for a total of 30 guns. The southern group was commanded by Major Shoup and contained a group of batteries which had been under Shoup"s supervision and had been resting following the morning fight near the main Corinth Road. The southern group of guns, commanded by Major Shoup included Roberts Arkansas battery 4 guns, Triggs Arkansas battery 4 guns, Sweet's Mississippi battery 6 guns, a section of Hubbard's Arkansas battery (Lt Thrall commanding) 2 guns, Brynes Kentucky battery, 7 guns and a section of Cobb's Kentucky Battery, 2 guns, for a total of 25 guns. The guns of these two groups came from different areas of the battlefield. It appears that Shoup was not initially aware of the presence of the northern group of guns or Ruggles' orders to gather the guns. The resulting artillery concentration of 55 guns was, up to that time, the largest concentration of artillery ever on the North American continent and was itself a historical event. This status did not last long as it was quickly surpassed by even larger artillery concentrations in the Eastern Theater of the war. The grand battery enabled Confederates to surround the position, and the Hornet's Nest fell after holding out for seven hours.

In early May 1862, Confederate forces underwent an army-wide reorganization due to the passage of the Conscription Act by the Confederate Congress in April 1862. All twelve-month units had to re-muster and enlist for two additional years or the duration of the war; a new election of officers was ordered; and men who were exempted from service by age or other reasons under the Conscription Act were allowed to take a discharge and go home. Officers who did not choose to stand for re-election were also offered a discharge. The reorganization was accomplished among all the Arkansas units in and around Corinth, Mississippi, following the Battle of Shiloh.

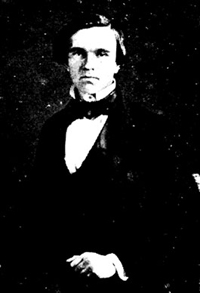
Captain Thomas, J. Key, Commander Helena Artillery

=== Siege of Corinth ===
The Siege of Corinth (also known as the First Battle of Corinth) was fought from April 29 to May 30, 1862, in Corinth, Mississippi. The town was a strategic point at the junction of two vital railroad lines, the Mobile and Ohio Railroad and the Memphis and Charleston Railroad. Following the Union Army victory at the Battle of Shiloh, Maj. Gen. Henry Halleck amassed three Union armies—the Army of the Tennessee, the Army of the Ohio, and the Army of the Mississippi—for an advance on the vital rail center of Corinth, Mississippi. Made cautious by the staggering losses at Shiloh, Halleck embarked on a tedious campaign of offensive entrenchment, fortifying after each advance. By May 25, 1862, after moving five miles in three weeks, Halleck was in position to lay siege to the town. Confederate morale was low and Beauregard, heavily outnumbered, and with a Typhoid epidemic raging in his ranks, held a council of war. After conferring with his officers, Beauregard concluded that he could not hold the railroad crossover. The siege ended as the Confederates withdrew.

When Lieutenant General Braxton Bragg issued his organization of the Confederate Army of the Mississippi, on June 30, 1862, Calvert's Battery was assigned to Brigadier General Patrick R. Cleburne 2nd Brigade of Major General William E. Hardee's 3rd Army Corps.

=== Kentucky Campaign ===
During the Kentucky Campaign in the summer of 1862, Calvert's Arkansas Battery was assigned to Major General William E. Hardee's Left Wing (Corps) of the Army of Mississippi. During the October 8, 1862, Battle of Perryville, the battery was split, with one section of two 6-pound Smooth Boore cannon under Second Lieutenant Thomas J. Key assigned to support Brigadier General Patrick Ronayne Cleburne's 2nd Brigade of Major General Simon Bolivar Buckner's Third Division and one section of two 12-pounder Howitzers under Second Lieutenant Sylvanus G. Hanley assigned to support Colonel Joseph Wheeler's Cavalry Brigade. Following Bragg's decision to retreat from Kentucky, the Confederate Army of the Mississippi was renamed on November 20, 1862, as the Army of Tennessee and was divided into two corps commanded by Generals Polk and William J. Hardee. A third corps was formed from troops from the Department of East Tennessee and commanded by Edmund Kirby Smith.

=== Stones River Campaign ===
The Battle of Stones River or the Battle of Murfreesboro as it was known in the South was fought from December 31, 1862, to January 2, 1863, in Middle Tennessee, as the culmination of the Stones River Campaign. During the battle of Stones River, the Helena Arkansas Artillery, now under the command of Lieutenant Thomas J. Key, was assigned to Brigadier General Lucius E. Polk's 1st Brigade of Major General Patrick R. Cleburne's Division of Lieutenant General William J. Hardee's Corps of the Confederate Army of Tennessee. Lieutenant Key, commanding Calvert's battery, filed his report of the report of the roll of his battery in the battle from the Artillery Camp at Tullahoma, Tenn., January 23, 1863:

On the morning of December 31, 1862, Captain [J. H.] Calvert's battery moved forward on the left wing of the Confederate Army, supporting General Polk's brigade. ... a brigade which was concealed in a dark cedar grove and behind large rocks, and to dislodge them Colonel Hill sent to my battery for one piece of artillery, which was immediately dispatched, under charge of Lieutenant Fitzpatrick. After the right wing of the enemy had been driven a mile, one of their batteries was discovered firing upon General Polk's lines, and immediately my battery rushed in advance of the brigade in open field and engaged the enemy. So soon as we opened upon the enemy's artillery it returned the fire with deadly aim, wounding 1 man and killing 3 horses. My artillery killed the Abolition captain, 1 sergeant, and 2 or 3 cannoneers, and cut down 1 of his caissons and a number of horses. The battery was silenced and made a hasty retreat. ...

The next point of attack was near the Nashville and Franklin pike, where the Abolition infantry had ensconced themselves in a dense forest of timber, and were awaiting the advance of our forces to mow them down as they pursued over an open field. This battery began shelling the woods, and routed the Abolitionists in front, but they rallied and renewed the attack on our left, and promptly we turned our guns upon them, and they were hurled back in confusion. ...

The fourth place of action was, after we had pursued the enemy's batteries into the clustering cedars, near the railroad, where they were masked. ... The contest was unequal and desperate. Their rifle guns could throw canister as far as ours could spherical case, and in order to prevent annihilation we were forced to withdraw.

The fifth position was in the field west of the enemy's concentrated artillery, where we fought them until we had exhausted our ammunition, losing in this engagement one of our bravest and most expert No. 1 cannoneers. The enemy turned a triple number of pieces upon us. ...

The sixth and last action was near that same intertwined and matted grove of cedars. Here also the contest was unequal. It was in this engagement that Lieutenaut Fitzpatrick lost his left hand by a canister, and a cannoneer's head was shot off, and a number of horses were killed, and one howitzer slightly damaged. Finding that we could not move the enemy from his strong position, and that smooth-bore guns could not cope with Parrott and rifled guns, we withdrew from the contest.

The battery lost 3 men killed, 1 officer and 4 men wounded, 10 horses killed and wounded, and 4 sets of harness. ...

Capt Calvert was accused of drunkenness during the battle. This was no doubt a difficult situation for General Cleburne, now commanding the division, since Calvert had served as the drill instructor for Cleburne's old militia company prior to the war. This relationship had apparently given Cleburne reason to save Calvert's career following a previous bout of drunkenness in Nashville earlier in the war. That time Calvert had vowed to remain sober and retained command. This time Calvert was forced to resign on 6 February 1863. Lieutenant Thomas J. Key, a former newspaper editor from Helena Arkansas became the battery commander following Calvert's resignation. The battery would continued to be known as Calvert's Arkansas Artillery in official reports, until the Atlanta Campaign in 1864.

After the defeat at the Battle of Murfreesboro, General Braxton Bragg had his army occupy strong defensive positions around Tullahoma, Tennessee. Union General Rosecrans spent five and a half months reinforcing Murfreesboro and building earthworks. The next major operation, the Tullahoma Campaign, did not come until June 1863, when Rosecrans finally moved his army against Bragg.

=== Tullahoma Campaign ===
The Tullahoma Campaign was fought between June 24 and July 3, 1863, during the American Civil War. The Union Army of the Cumberland, commanded by Maj. Gen. William Rosecrans, outmaneuvered the Confederate Army of Tennessee, commanded by General Braxton Bragg, from a strong defensive position, driving the Confederates from Middle Tennessee and threatening Chattanooga. The battery was not directly engaged in either of the major engagements at Liberty Gap or Hoover's Gap.

=== Chickamauga Campaign ===
In General Braxton Bragg's report on the Organization of troops in Department No 2, on July 31, 1863, Calvert's Arkansas Battery, under the command of Lieutenant Key, was listed as assigned to Brigadier General L.E. Polk's Brigade of Major General Patrick R. Cleburne's Division or Lieutenant General D.H. Hill's Army Corps. The battery was still assigned to Polk's brigade in the August 10, 1863 report on the organization of troops in the Department of Tennessee. During the Battle of Chickamauga, Calvert's Arkansas Battery, under the Command of Lieutenant Key was assigned to an artillery battalion consisting of Douglas Texas Battery and Semple's Alabama Battery, under the command of Major T.R. Hotchkiss. The battalion supported Major General Cleburne's Division of Lieutenant General D.H. Hill's Corps of the Army of Tennessee. On October 6, 1863, Lieutenant Key provided a report on the battery's roll in the battle:

Sunday morning I again engaged the enemy, and in the midst of the battle-storm had one howitzer disabled, when the battery was withdrawn, securing the disabled piece. About 5 o'clock the same day General Polk's brigade assailed the enemy in his breastworks. ... I caused my guns to be run by hand upon a small elevation to within 170 yards of the enemy's fortifications, and I poured double charges of canister into them so hotly and briskly that a brief space had elapsed before their battery was silenced and their infantry so demoralized that they fled in haste from their covering to the rear.

To form a correct estimate of execution done by this battery I will mention that a lieutenant (a prisoner) of the Sixteenth U. S. Regulars states that two shots of canister from my guns killed and wounded 38 of his company, killing his captain. ... .

During the several engagements I had 1 mortally and 5 men slightly wounded, 3 of whom have returned to duty. Three horses in the battery were killed, but the harness was secured.

On Sunday, jointly with the brigade, I captured and carried off 2 rifled pieces of artillery and 1 caisson full of ammunition.

=== Chattanooga Campaign ===
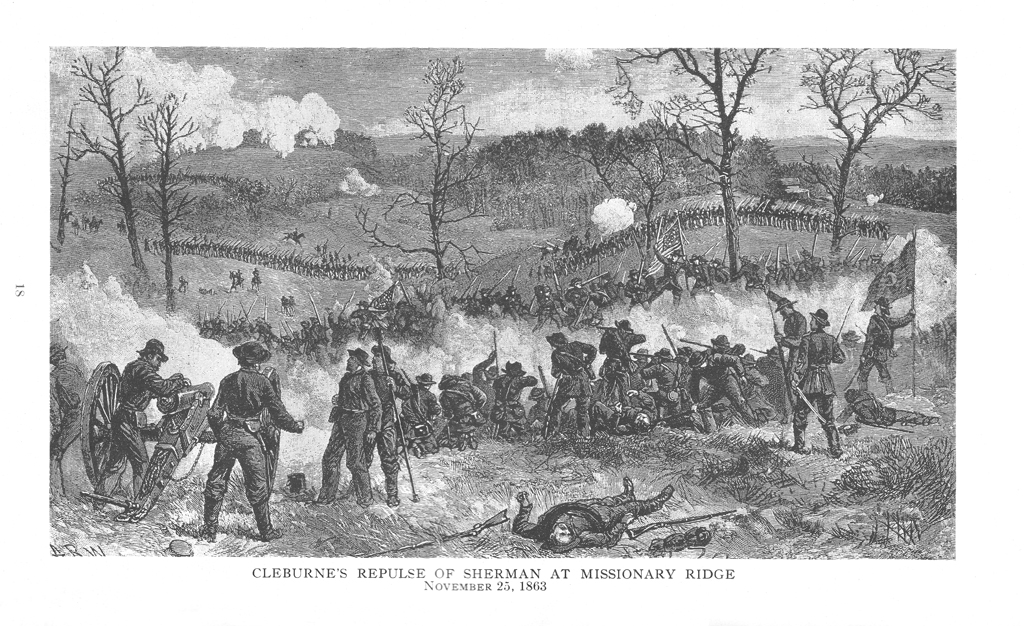
Repulse of Sherman's Attack on Missionary Ridge by Cleburne's Division with Calvert's Battery

The Chattanooga campaign was a series of maneuvers and battles in October and November 1863, during the American Civil War. Following the defeat of Maj. Gen. William S. Rosecrans' Union Army of the Cumberland at the Battle of Chickamauga in September, the Confederate Army of Tennessee under Gen. Braxton Bragg besieged Rosecrans and his men by occupying key high terrain around Chattanooga, Tennessee. Maj. Gen. Ulysses S. Grant was given command of Union forces in the West and significant reinforcements began to arrive with him in Chattanooga from Mississippi and the Eastern Theater.

The Union Army of the Tennessee under Maj. Gen. William T. Sherman maneuvered to launch a surprise attack against Bragg's right flank on Missionary Ridge. On November 25, Sherman's attack on Bragg's right flank at Tunnel Hill on the east end of Missionary Ridge, which was defended by Cleburne's Division, with Calvert's Arkansas Battery. Lieutenant Key and the battery were praised in Cleburne's report of the battle.

Calvert's battery, commanded by Lieut. Thomas J. Key, I placed directly over the tunnel, and between the tunnel and left of Smith's brigade were placed three regiments of Brown's brigade, of Stevenson's division.

I ordered Key's battery of four light field pieces to move up and replace the guns sent off, and put Lieutenant Key in command of all the artillery on Tunnel Hill. ...

Key fired rapidly into the charging line as it crossed the open ground at the west foot of the ridge, but it was soon under shelter. At the steep the enemy's line now seemed to form into a heavy column on the march and rushed up the hill in the direction of the batteries. ...

This desperate attack had now lasted more than half an hour. Key was depressing his guns to the utmost and firing shell and canister down the hill in the face of the enemy's fire...

It is but justice for me to state that the brunt of this long day's fight was borne by Smith's (Texas) brigade and the Second, Fifteenth, and Twenty-fourth Arkansas (consolidated), of Govan's brigade, together with Swett's and Key's batteries.

Swett's battery, under command of Lieut. H. Shannon, and Calvert's battery, commanded by Lieut. Thomas J. Key, were bravely fought and did great execution ...

Hoping to distract Bragg's attention, Grant authorized Thomas's army to advance in the center of his line to the base of Missionary Ridge. A combination of misunderstood orders and the pressure of the tactical situation caused Thomas's men to surge to the top of Missionary Ridge, routing the Army of Tennessee, which retreated to Dalton, Georgia, fighting off the Union pursuit successfully at the Battle of Ringgold Gap. Bragg's defeat eliminated the last Confederate control of Tennessee and opened the door to an invasion of the Deep South, leading to Sherman's Atlanta campaign of 1864.

=== Atlanta Campaign ===
During the Atlanta campaign, Key's Battery was assigned to Hochkiss's Battalion, usually part of Major General Patrick Cleburne's Division. The battalion also included Goldthwaite's Alabama Battery and Sweet's Mississippi Battery. On December 14, 1863, the battery was reported 93 assigned, with 71 present for duty, 60 of which were listed as effective. The remaining 22 were listed as absent. The battery's armament at the time was listed as two 12 pound Howitzers and two 6-pounder guns.

According to the report of Major T.R. Hotchkiss, Key's battery was the first battery to fire on a Union Brigade involved in the demonstration against Dalton, Georgia on February 25, 1864. The battery engaged at a range of approximately 700 yards and fired approximately nine rounds per gun. A report on the light artillery assigned to the Army of Tennessee on April 1, 1864, lists Keys battery as composed of four 12-pounder howitzers, with a strength of 61 present of 81 assigned. Key had command of the battalion through much of the campaign.

During the Battle of Pickett's Mill on May 27, 1864, Key's Arkansas Battery occupied a position with Major General Cleburne's Division. As Brigadier General William B. Hazen's brigade attacked Cleburne's line, Key and some of his men rolled two of his guns from their original position on a ridgeline, to the far right of the line. Hazen's men suffered appalling casualties at the hands of Key's gunners. Another Brigade under Colonel William H. Gibson took its place and receive equally rough treatment. Finally, Colonel Frederick Knefler attempted to help extract Gibson's brigade and were also driven away by Key's guns. Key's two guns fired a total of 187 rounds of canister and spherical case shot during the Union assault.

The Battle of Peachtree Creek on July 20, 1864, was the first major engagement after John Bell Hood replaced Joe Johnston as commander of the Army of Tennessee. Key's Arkansas Battery supported the attack of Brigadier General Daniel C. Govan's brigade of Cleuburne's Division. By July 23, 1864, Captain Key was in command of Hotshkiss's Battalion of Artillery and Lieutenant James G. Marshall was leading the Helena Artillery.

On September 1, 1864, at the Battle of Jonesboro, Georgia, the battery, along with the rest of Govan's Brigade of Cleburne's Division was overrun and captured. The Battery's flag was captured by Company E, 3rd Ohio Volunteers. Only 12 men escaped capture with the battery. Due to a special cartel between Union General Sherman and Confederate General John B. Hood, the unit was quickly paroled and exchanged for Union prisoners held at Andersonville Prison. The battery re-entered service approximately a month later. The battery and Govan's Brigade were released and exchanged just in time to participate in General John B. Hood's disastrous Franklin-Nashville Campaign.

=== Franklin-Nashville Campaign ===
After the fall of Atlanta, Key's Battery moved north with General John B. Hood into Tennessee and participated in the Battle of Nashville. The battery was not present for the fatal Battle of Franklin, in which General Cleburne and so much of his division were killed. The battery had been detailed along with James A. Smith's Brigade of Cleburne's Division to guard the wagontrain. The battery joined the remainder of Hood's army in front of Nashville on December 6, 1864. When an ice storm struck during the siege of Nashville, Captain Key recorded in his diary, "The Soldier's stand around their fires warming one side while the other side grows cold, and shed tears from the strong smoke which puffs in their eyes. ... Our artillery carrages are frozen in the ground and an inch of ice coats my brass guns." After the defeat at the Battle of Nashville and the retreat from Tennessee, the battery was without serviceable horses to pull its guns and along with server other batteries in similar condition, was assigned to the defense of Macon, GA to refit and to recruit more soldiers.

=== Battles ===
The Helena Artillery was involved in the following battles:

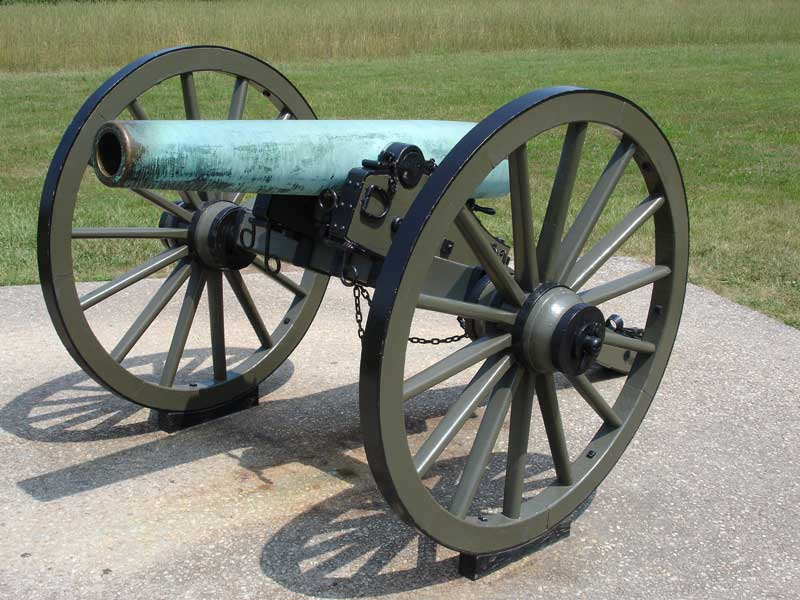
Confederate 12-Pound "Napoleon"

- Battle of Shiloh, Tennessee, April 6–7, 1862.
- Siege of Corinth, April to June 1862.
- Kentucky Campaign
  - Battle of Perryville, Kentucky, October 8, 1862.
- Stones River Campaign
  - Battle of Murfreesboro, Tennessee, December 31, 1862, to January 3, 1863.
- Tullahoma Campaign, June 24 - July 3, 1863.
  - Battle of Liberty Gap, Tennessee, June 24–26, 1863.
- Chickamauga Campaign
  - Battle of Chickamauga, Georgia, September 19–20, 1863.
- Siege of Chattanooga
  - Battle of Missionary Ridge, November 25, 1863.
- Atlanta campaign, May to September 1864.
  - Battle of Pickett's Mill, Georgia, May 27, 1864.
  - Battle of Kennesaw Mountain, Georgia, June 27, 1864.
  - Siege of Atlanta, Georgia, July 22, 1864.
  - Battle of Jonesboro, Georgia, August 31 and September 1, 1864.
- Franklin-Nashville Campaign
  - Battle of Nashville, Tennessee, December 15–16, 1864.

== Surrender ==
Key and the remnants of his battery spent the winter 1865 in Macon, Georgia. The unit had been left behind to recruit and look for horses when the defeated remnants of the Army of the Tennessee were making their way back from the disastrous Nashville Campaign, and then moved to its ultimate surrender in North Carolina. Key and his men participated in efforts to defend Macon from a raid by Major General James Harrison Wilson in the closing days of the war and were still engaged in this effort when they learned of the armistice between Confederate General Joseph E. Johnson and Union General William T. Sherman. Key and a portion of the battery surrendered to General Wilson's troops on April 20, 1865, at Macon, Georgia. Another set of paroles were signed by First Sergeant D. G. Johnson and a group of Key's men two weeks later on 4 May 1865, at Selma, Alabama.

== Battle flag ==
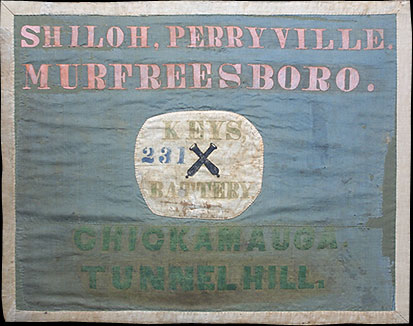

One battle flag from Key's Arkansas Battery has survived. Like the other units in Cleburne's Arkansas Division the unit was issued a Hardee pattern flag. The flag is cotton with dark green, black and red paint. It measures 30 × 36 inches and has the War Department Capture Number 231 painted on the flag. Key's Battery was captured with most of the rest of Daniel Govan's Arkansas brigade in the fighting at Jonesboro, Georgia, on 1 September 1864. The flag is consistent with the last two flags of the 1864 issue, and as a group they reinforce the observation that decorating was done at the brigade level at this point in the war. The crossed cannon are unusual on an artillery flag, as they generally honor capture of enemy guns by infantry. The honor may have been extended for silencing enemy guns in an exchange, but is unknown before 1864. The flag is currently in the collection of the Old State House Museum, Little Rock, Arkansas.

== See also ==
- List of Confederate units from Arkansas

== Bibliography ==
- Arkansas. (1860). Militia law of the state of Arkansas. Little Rock: Johnson & Yerkes, State Printers.
- Bearss, Edwin C. "Joseph Wheeler." In The Confederate General, vol. 6, edited by William C. Davis and Julie Hoffman. Harrisburg, PA: National Historical Society, 1991. ISBN 0-918678-68-4.
- Catton, Bruce, A Stillness at Appomattox, Doubleday 1953, Library of Congress # 53–9982, ISBN 0-385-04451-8
- Connelly, Thomas L. Autumn of Glory: The Army of Tennessee 1862–1865. Baton Rouge: Louisiana State University Press, 1971. ISBN 0-8071-2738-8.
- Cunningham, E., Joiner, G. D., Smith, T. B., & ebrary, Inc. (2009). Shiloh and the Western Campaign of 1862. New York: Savas Beatie.
- Daniels, Larry (2005). Cannoneers in Gray: The Field Artillery of the Army of Tennessee, 1861–1865. Tuscaloosa, AL: Fire Ant Books.
- Dedmondt, Glenn "The Flags Of Civil War Arkansas", (Pelican Publishing Co., 2009). ISBN 978-1-58980-190-5
- Dupuy, Trevor N., Curt Johnson, and David L. Bongard. The Harper Encyclopedia of Military Biography. New York: HarperCollins, 1992. ISBN 978-0-06-270015-5.
- Eicher, John H., and David J. Eicher. Civil War High Commands. Stanford, CA: Stanford University Press, 2001. ISBN 0-8047-3641-3.
- Esposito, Vincent J. (1959). West Point Atlas of American Wars. Vol. 1: 1689–1900 (1st ed.). New York: Frederick A. Praeger Publishers. OCLC 5890637.
- Evans, C. A. (1962). Confederate military history: A library of Confederate States history, in twelve volumes. New York: Thomas Yoseloff.
- Hale, D. (1993). The Third Texas Cavalry in the Civil War. Norman: University of Oklahoma Press.
- Iobst, Richard W. Civil War Macon: The History of a Confederate City. Macon, Ga: Mercer University Press, 1999.
- In Cate, W. A., Key, T. J., & Campbell, R. J. (1938). Two soldiers: The campaign diaries of Thomas J. Key, C.S.A., December 7, 1863 – May 17, 1865, and Robert J. Campbell, U.S.A., January 1, 1864 – July 21, 1864. Chapel Hill: The University of North Carolina Press.
- McKay, John. Brave Men in Desperate Times: The Lives of Civil War Soldiers. Guilford, Conn: TwoDot, 2007.
- Nevin, D., & Time-Life Books. (1983). The road to Shiloh: Early battles in the West. Alexandria, Va: Time-Life Books.
- Sifakis, Stewart (1988). Who Was Who in the Civil War. New York: Facts on File. ISBN 978-0-8160-1055-4.
- Upton, E., Sanger, J. P., Beach, W. D., & Rhodes, C. D. (1916). The military policy of the United States. Washington: Govt. Print. Off.
- United States. (1961). Compiled service records of Confederate soldiers who served in organizations from the State of Arkansas. Washington D.C.: National Archives, National Archives and Records Service, General Services Administration.
- U.S. War Department, The War of the Rebellion: a Compilation of the Official Records of the Union and Confederate Armies, U.S. Government Printing Office, 1880–1901.
