= 9th Arkansas Field Battery =

9th Arkansas Field Battery (Confederate)
- Active: 1863–1865
- Disbanded: 1865
- Country: Confederate States of America
- Allegiance: CSA
- Branch: Artillery
- Size: Battery
- Engagements: American Civil War

Commanders
- Commander: Captain John T. Trigg
- Acting Commander: 1st Lieutenant Anderson Mills

The 9th Arkansas Field Battery (1863–1865) was a Confederate Army artillery battery during the American Civil War. Also known as: Trigg's Arkansas Artillery Battery. This battery is distinguished from an earlier battery commanded by the same Captain John T. Trigg, which was also known as Trigg's Arkansas Battery, or Austin's Battery or the Austin Artillery and participated in the Battle of Shiloh. Trigg's earlier battery was disbanded in July 1862.

== Confusion regarding naming ==
John T. Trigg commanded a battery in Hardee's Third Corps of the Army of Mississippi during the Battle of Shiloh. That battery was subsequently disbanded in July 1862. Captain Trigg drops from sight until his name reappears in Special Orders No. 161, District of Arkansas, dated from Arkadelphia on September 20, 1863, which ordered Captain Trigg, with his company to report to the commanding officer of Price's Division. Exactly where and when this new company was formed is unclear from the records. A few days later, on October 11, 1863, Trigg requested and apparently was granted a furlough of four days.

Arkansas' capital city, Little Rock, had fallen to Union forces on September 10, 1862. During the operations leading up to the fall of the capital, W. E. Woodruff, formerly of the Pulaski Light Artillery, had formed a temporary battery for the defence of Little Rock. The battery was under the command of Woodruff and 1st Lieutenant Anderson Mills "of Trigg's battery, on leave". Woodruff goes on to state "Mills was first lieutenant of Trigg's battery, so assigned from Marshall's Battery. He was acting captain for the new battery from its inception until the surrender". It is assumed that the "new battery" refers to Trigg's Battery. The Compiled Service Record for R. A. Mills (Arkansas Miscellaneous) has the note "1st Lieut Comdg 9th Ark Batty. Trigg's Battery." It may be that the 9th Arkansas Field Battery was Trigg's in name only.

== Service ==
On September 11, 1864, Brigadier General Churchill issued Special Order Number 72 from Camp Yell which mentioned Trigg's Battery:

(Paragraph) III. Major Blocher will move to-morrow morning with Captains Marshall's and Etter's batteries, leaving Captain Trigg's battery in its present encampment until further orders.

In General E. Kirby Smith's September 30, 1864, report on the Organization of the Army of the Trans-Mississippi Department, Trigg's Battery is listed as belonging to the 8th Mounted Artillery Battalion, along with Etter's 6th Arkansas Field Battery and Edgar's (Texas) battery. On November 19, 1864, General Smith's issued Special Orders Number 290 from Shreveport, La., which reorganized the Artillery of the Army of the Department of the Trans-Mississippi:

XIX. The following will in future be the organization of the artillery in the Trans-Mississippi Department: ... Battalion of Reserve: First Mississippi Field Battery, Captain W. Hart, 4 guns (mounted); Fourth Louisiana Field Battery, Captain A. J. Cameron, 4 guns (mounted); Fifth Arkansas Field Battery, Captain C. C. Scott, 4 guns (mounted); Sixth Arkansas Field Battery, Captain C. B. Etter, 4 guns (mounted); Ninth Arkansas Field Battery, Captain John T. Trigg, 4 guns (mounted); total, 24.

== Surrender ==
The Army of the Trans-Mississippi was surrendered by General Kirby Smith on May 26, 1865. The date of the military convention between Confederate General Edmund Kirby Smith and Union General Edward Canby for the surrender of the troops and public property in the Trans-Mississippi Department was May 26, 1865, however, it took a while for parole commissioners to be appointed and for public property to be accounted for. As a result, a final report of field artillery which was part of the accounting process, was not completed until June 1, 1865. Unlike the other Arkansas batteries, Trigg's 9th Arkansas Field Battery is not listed in the final accounting of government property.

== See also ==
- List of Confederate units from Arkansas
- Confederate Units by State
