= 3rd Arkansas Light Artillery =

- Active: 1861–1865
- Country: Confederate States of America
- Allegiance: CSA
- Branch: Artillery
- Size: Battery
- Nickname: Jackson Light Artillery
- Engagements: American Civil War: Battle of Shiloh; Siege of Corinth; Vicksburg Campaign; Siege of Jackson; Meridian Expedition; Battle of Okolona; Forrest's Defense of Mississippi; Battle of Brice's Crossroads; Battle of Tupelo; Franklin–Nashville Campaign; Battle of Johnsonville; Mobile Campaign; Battle of Spanish Fort
- Website: Jackson Light Artillery (Thrall’s Battery)

Commanders
- 1861: Captain George W. McCown
- 1861–1862: Captain George T. Hubbard
- 1862–1865: Captain James C. Thrall

The 3rd Arkansas Light Artillery, also known as the Jackson Light Artillery (1861–1865), was a Confederate Army artillery battery during the American Civil War. The battery spent the majority of the war serving in Confederate forces east of the Mississippi River. The battery is also known as McCown's Battery, Hubbard's Battery, and Thrall's Battery in official reports.

== Organization ==
The Jackson Light Artillery was organized at Jacksonport, Jackson County, Arkansas, on June 15, 1861. Most of the original members of the battery were from Jackson County, but there were men from neighboring Craighead, Independence, Lawrence, White and present-day Woodruff counties who also joined the battery at Jacksonport. Although officially named the Jackson Light Artillery, it was the practice in the Confederate Army to refer to a battery by the name of its current commander; thus, it is variously identified in most contemporary records as McCown's Battery, Hubbard's Battery, and Thrall's Battery. In the "Compiled Service Records of Confederate Soldiers Who Served in Organizations From the State of Arkansas," the service records of these men are carried under the heading "Thrall's Battery" on Roll 42.

At the battery's organization, George W. McCown was elected captain, James C. Thrall was elected first lieutenant, George T. Hubbard was elected second lieutenant, and Robert S. Anderson was elected third lieutenant. The battery marched to Pitman's Ferry, near Pocahontas in Randolph County, where it enlisted in the Confederate service on July 25, 1861. A week earlier, on July 17, Captain McCown had resigned and returned to Jacksonport. Lieutenant Hubbard was elected captain in his place.

A total of 165 men served in this unit from June 15, 1861, to May 11, 1865. A remarkable number of original members served with the battery through the entire conflict. The battery had one of the lowest desertion rates in the Confederate Army. Even among the large number of conscripts who joined the battery in 1863 there were relatively few deserters. From all contemporary accounts, it seems that the Jackson Light Artillery enjoyed competent leadership and high morale throughout the war.

On July 14, 1861, Confederate Brigadier General William J. Hardee arrived in Little Rock to assume unified Confederate command in the state. The following day the state Military Board signed an "Article of Transfer", which provided that all state forces would be transferred on a voluntary basis to the command of the Confederate States of America. The Articles of Transfer included Major Francis A. Shoup's battalion of artillery;

Company A, Captain A. W. Clarkson's Helena Light Artillery,
Company B, Captain John T. Trigg's Arkansas Battery; and
Company C, Captain George T. Hubbard's Jackson Light Artillery.

Many Confederate artillery units seem to have begun the war named for the city or county that sponsored their organization. In the Official Records of the Union and Confederate Armies, artillery units are most often referred to by the name of their battery commander. During the war, efforts were made to organize artillery units into battalions and regiments, but the battalions seldom functioned as a consolidated organization, in fact batteries were often broken out and fought as one or two gun sections. Shoup's battalion would be an exception to this rule.

== Service ==
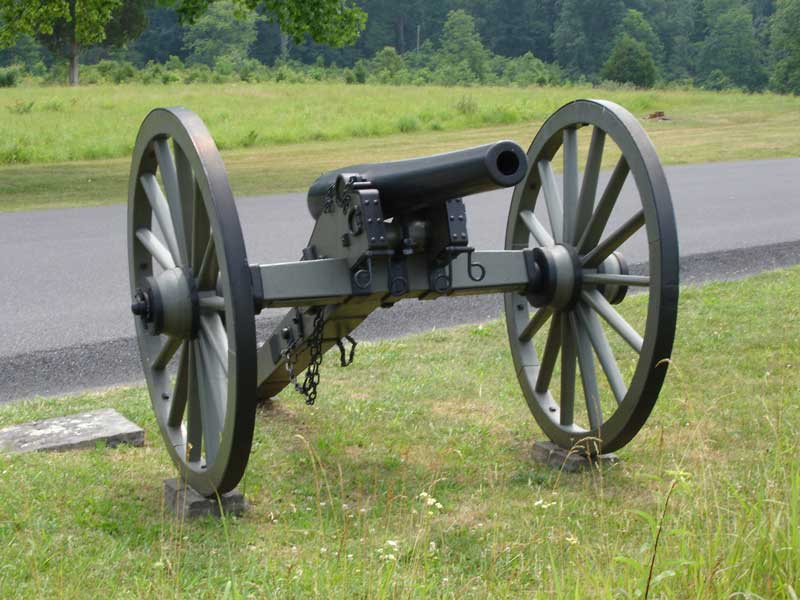
A 3 Inch Rifled Gun

The battery, as part of Shoup's Battalion moved to central Kentucky with Hardee's forces. Major Shoup's battalion was associated with Brigadier General Patrick Cleburne's brigade when it moved into Kentucky and remained so until after the battle of Shiloh. The Battalion was in the retreat from Bowling Green to Corinth, Mississippi, following the fall of Forts Donelson and Henry.;

During the Battle of Shiloh, a.k.a. Pittsburg Landing, Tennessee, Sunday, April 6, 1862 – Monday, April 7, 1862, the battery, armed with two 6-pounder smoothbores and two rifled 3-inch guns became involved in what was at that time, the largest massed artillery attack in North America. The unit was attached to General Patrick Cleburne's 2nd Brigade of Major General William J. Hardee Third Army Corps. By the afternoon of Sunday, April 6, 1862, men of Prentiss's and W. H. L. Wallace's divisions had established and held a position nicknamed the Hornet's Nest. The Confederates assaulted the position for several hours rather than simply bypassing it, and they suffered heavy casualties during these assaults. It was not until the Confederates, led by Brig. Gen. Daniel Ruggles, assembled over 50 cannons, including on section of Hubbard's Battery, commanded by Lieutenant Thrall, into a position known as "Ruggles's Battery" to blast the line at close range that they were able to surround the position, and the Hornet's Nest fell after holding out for seven hours.

In response to a request from Brig. Gen. Ruggles, Captain Thrall filed a report on April 1, 1863, of his and other Arkansas artillery unit's roll in the Battle of Shiloh and the formation of Ruggles' Battery:

At that time I was first lieutenant, commanding the right section of an Arkansas battery, commanded by Capt. George T. Hubbard, in Brigadier-General Cleburne's brigade, Maj. Gen. W. J. Hardee's corps. About I p.m. I was moving on the right of General Hardee's lines with ray section, when I came to a ravine, and was about to have some trouble crossing, when I was met by one of Major-General Polk's staff officers, who directed me to move to my right to a road, in order that I might move forward without any difficulty, which I did as rapidly as possible, and came into action on the left of Captain Bankhead's battery. My position being a bad one, in a dense thicket, I was compelled to fall back, followed by Captain Bankhead. I soon moved forward with my section, by order of Major General Polk, when I was met and placed into position by yourself, with directions to throw some shot through a log house and some spherical case at some bales of cotton that were in the edge of a field, where there was quite a number of the enemy concealed.

At this time there was no other battery engaged at this point. Brigadier-General Ruggles then directed me to move to my right and throw some shells into a thicket across a field. I had fired but three or four rounds when a rifle battery replied to me most handsomely, and it being a little more than I felt disposed to contend with, General Ruggles ordered me to move my section up to my right, where I was joined by Captain Byrne's (Mississippi) battery. Here I heard General Ruggles say that it was his intention to concentrate as much artillery as possible at this point, to prevent General Prentiss from being re-enforced from the river.

As soon as I had replenished the limber chests of my guns from my caissons General Ruggles ordered me back to my former position. Captain Byrne's (Mississippi) battery formed on my right, Captain Swett's (Mississippi) battery, and Captains Trigg's and Roberts' (Arkansas) batteries formed on my left. There were other batteries farther to my left, but I am unable to state by whom they were commanded.

The concentration of artillery at this point proved very effective The re-enforcements that were going to the relief of General Prentiss, not being able to withstand the shower of shot, shell, and shrapnel that was poured upon them, fell back in confusion toward the river, which resulted in the surrender of General Prentiss, with his division ...

I have the honor to remain, captain, your obedient servant,

JAMES C. THRALL,

Captain of Artillery

James C. Thrall succeeded Captain Hubbard as battery commander on May 12, 1862, and remained in command until the end of the war.

=== Heavy Artillery ===
After fighting at Shiloh the unit was assigned to the Department of Mississippi and East Louisiana and was active in the Siege of Jackson during the Vicksburg Campaign in the summer of 1863.

The battery is listed in an August 29, 1862, report of Heavy Artillery at Columbus, Mississippi and again on September 14, 1862.

The battery is listed as Thrall's Heavy Battery and is listed as being stationed at Columbus Mississippi, according to a report of Lieutenant General John C. Pemberton in December, 1862. On January 1, 1863, Colonel Adams reported:

Captain Thrall's company of heavy artillery is stationed 1 ½ miles north of Columbus, on the Aberdeen road. They have one 32-pounder siege gun, on 3-inch rifle gun, and one 6-pounder smooth-bore gun, with equipments; 103 rounds 12 pounder blank cartridges, 30 rounds 12 pounder Read shot, 40 rounds 12-pounder canister, 51 percussion muskets and accouterments, 4,000 musket-cartridges, and 4,000 percussion caps; all in good condition. This company is also to serve guns on the fortifications.

The battery is mentioned again by Lieutenant General John C. Pemberton on January 31, 1863, the battery was assigned to the Department of Mississippi and Eastern Louisiana, Brigadier General Daniel Ruggles' First Military District.

On March 6, 1863, Brigadier General Ruggles ordered that Thrall's battery be supplied with sufficient horses to be assigned to support cavalry in the field. In June 1863, General Ruggles described his efforts to equip Thrall's battery as a six gun light battery for field service.

According to another report from Lieutenant General John C. Pemberton in April 1863, the battery was assigned to the Department of Mississippi and Eastern Louisiana, Brigadier General Daniel Ruggles' First Military District. On July 1, 1863, during the Siege of Vicksburg, the battery was reported to be stationed a Columbus Mississippi, still assigned to Brigadier General Daniel Ruggles' First Military District.

After the fall of Vicksburg, the battery was included in a January 5, 1864, list of light batteries in the Army of the West, commanded by Lieutenant General Leonidas Polk. The battery is described as consisting of four-6 lb bronze smoothbore- Two-6 lb 3.80 inch bronze rifled guns. General Polk list the battery again in his report on the composition of his army on January 20, 1864, as being assigned to Brigadier General Daniel Ruggles command of Brigadier General James R. Chalmers Division of Major General Stephen D. Lee's Cavalry Corps.

=== Horse Artillery ===
During the early stages of the Chattanooga campaign, Confederate General Bragg ordered Major General Forrest to transfer the majority of his Cavalry Corps to Joseph Wheeler's cavalry corps. In response, an angry Forrest threatened to kill Bragg if he attempted to give him any further orders. This dispute compelled Confederate President Jefferson Davis to transfer Forrest to Mississippi to raise a new corps from western Tennessee; this transfer placed him under the command of Stephen D. Lee's Department of Mississippi and Eastern Louisiana. In December 1863 Forrest led a raid/recruiting mission into Western Tennessee and eventually organized his recruits into two divisions commanded by James R. Chalmers and Abraham Buford number over 3000 men.

Forrest moved his newly recruited force to Commo, Mississippi, which is probably where Thrall's battery joined the new command. By January 25, 1864, Thrall's Battery was assigned to Forrest's command. In February 1864. Union Maj. Gen. William Tecumseh Sherman launched a two pronged attack eastward toward Meridian, Mississippi. Meridian was an important railroad center and was home to a Confederate arsenal, military hospital, and prisoner-of-war stockade, as well as the headquarters for a number of state offices. Sherman planned to take Meridian and, if the situation was favorable, push on to Selma, Alabama, and possibly even threaten Mobile, Alabama. While Sherman set out on February 3, 1864, with the main force of 20,000 men from Vicksburg, he ordered Brig. Gen. William Sooy Smith to lead a cavalry force of 7,000 men from Memphis, Tennessee, south through Okolona, Mississippi, along the Mobile and Ohio Railroad to meet the rest of the Union force at Meridian.

As the campaigned opened, Thrall's battery was mentioned is several dispatches. On January 19, 1864, Lieutenant General Lineous Polk wrote to Major General Forrest and inquired, "Have you ordered Thrall's battery at Columbus over to General Chalmers? If not had you not better order it?" Major General Forrest wrote from Oxford Mississippi to Brigaider General Chalmers at Panola Mississippi February 8, 1864, to report, " ... Have ordered Thrall's battery to Oakland: if you find the enemy advancing, send for it." Major General Forrest wrote from Oxford Mississippi to Brigaider General Chalmers at Panola Mississippi at 5:40 p.m. on February 9, 1864, directing:

... Get Thrall's Battery up and keep sharp look out. I am of the opinion the real move is in the direction of Okolona and Meridian, keep your force well in had, so as to move at once if necessary. Watch at Belmont with your battery ...

in response, Brigaider Chalmers wrote to Colonel J.E. Forrest, (brother of General Forrest) on February 10, 1864, and directed, "Find Thrall's battery and order it here immediately. It should be near Oalkand"

Smith never reached Meridian; he and his troops encountered resistance from Major General Nathan Bedford Forrest at West Point, Mississippi. Forrest and his army forced Smith to begin to retreat to Tennessee. When Forrest saw Smith's army retreating, he ordered his troops to chase the army down. Forrest, with Thrall's battery, caught up with Smith and defeated them in the Battle of Okolona on February 22, 1864, which ultimately resulted in General Sherman's entire left flank being eliminated during the campaign. The battery participated in the Battle of Okolona, Mississippi, on February 22, 1864.

Next the battery, or at least the rifled section of the battery, was involved in the Affair at Yazoo City. Brigadier General R. V. Richardson filed a report on March 7, 1864, that described the battery's part in this action:

On February 23 [1864] I reached Elliott's Station on the evening of the 25th, and preparing three days' rations-leaving my train except my ambulances, taking only my effective men and horses, then numbering 600, and the rifle section of Thrall's battery- ...

... At 10 a. m. [on March 5, 1864] we commenced the attack. Colonel Mabry was ordered to attack on the plank road, Colonel Jones to carry the left central redoubt, Colonel Hawkins to carry the extreme right redoubt. These officers belonged to General Ross' brigade, and these dispositions were made by him. Acting under General Ross' advice, I placed Captain Thrall's section of artillery on a point about 1,000 yards from the right central redoubt and opened upon it. Captain Thrall soon obtained the range, and his shells seemed to burst right over the work. General Ross now moved on the plank road to the left, commanding the left wing. Colonel Hawkins, commanding the First Texas Legion, very soon drove the enemy from the extreme right redoubt, and this gave me a much better position for Thrall's section; also opened one of the main roads into the city, exposed the camp of the Eleventh Illinois Regiment and the north side of the main redoubt, which it now appeared the enemy intended to hold if possible. General Ross had now captured the two redoubts on the left of the main . or right central, and had placed his section of artillery (Lieutenant Johnston commanding) in a good position at easy range, and was playing it upon the main central with good effect. This work was the largest and strongest of all the works; had in it one piece of artillery, was flaunting the U. S. flag, and now became the special object of our attention. We now had four pieces throwing shells at this work. One of my pieces, however, soon disabled itself by its recoil.

I received a message from General Ross saying that he had thrown the forces of his wing, to wit, Colonel Mabry's, Colonel Jones', and the Twelfth Tennessee Cavalry (Colonel Neely commanding) around the east and south sides of the fort, and the shells which went over the works fell among our own men.

... Two gun-boats now opened their batteries upon us in the city and rained down showers of balls from exploding shrapnels. Captain Thrall now placed in position on one of the streets, m 50 yards of a brick house occupied by the enemy, his piece and opened upon it with terrible effect. I held the city for three hours, destroying quartermaster's stores and cotton, not without, however, a continuous struggle with the enemy's sharpshooters, posted in houses, and his gun-boats, until the latter were silenced. Colonel Logwood, having driven the enemy from the upper part of the city by gallant and impetuous charges, had wheeled his regiment upon its left and closed the circle of investment and commanded the sally-port of the main central redoubt.

... I desire also to commend Captain Thrall and his men and officers for their bravery and good firing on this occasion. The captain was wounded in the city after its capture, standing by his piece, by a sharpshooter of the enemy.

The battery is included in a May 10, 1864, report of the organization of Forrest's Cavalry, as being assigned to Brigadier General Abraham Buford's Division. Special Orders No. 55, dated May 14, 1864, issued from the Headquarters, Forrest Cavalry, assigned Thrall's battery, along with the batteries of Morton, Rice and Hudson, to a battalion of artillery to be commanded by Captain John W. Morton, as acting chief of artillery.

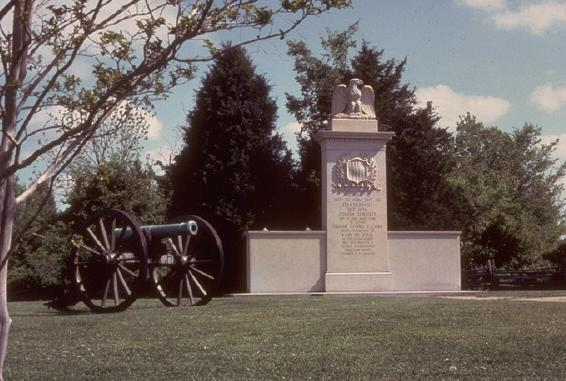
Brice's Crossroads Battlefield

Major General Stephen D. Lee, in his June 10, 1864, report on the organization of troops in the Department of Alabama, Mississippi, and East Louisiana, listed the battery as belonging to Buford's Cavalry Division, of Forrest Cavalry Corps. the battery assisted in Forrest's defense of Mississippi during the summer of 1864. In June Union General Samuel D. Sturgis led an expedition into northern Mississippi to keep Forrest from raiding Union supply lines during the Atlanta Campaign. On June 10, Forrest, with Thrall's battery, attacked Sturgis in the Battle of Brice's Crossroads and routed the Union force. Despite losing nearly 500 men, he inflicted over 2,200 casualties and captured 16 cannons, 176 wagons, and 1,500 small arms. During the Battle of Brice's Crossroads, the gunners of Thrall's battery unlimbered their guns and pushed them by hand behind the advancing lines of infantry.

In late June, Union Major General Andrew J. Smith launched another expedition into Mississippi to tie down the Confederate forces in the region. Forrest united with an infantry force commanded by Stephen Lee and attacked the Union forces near Harrisburg, Mississippi, on July 14; uncoordinated Confederate attacks on the Union right wing resulted in a Union victory. Only 3,500 of Forrest's and Lee's 7,000 men joined in the attack and 1,300 became casualties; Smith lost only 674 men. Despite his victory, Smith retreated from the field towards Tupolu, where Forrest attacked again the next day and was again defeated. During the battle, Forrest was wounded in the right thigh and was forced to turn command over to Chalmers. During the Battle of Tupelo, Captain Thrall's Battery was ordered by Captain Morton to support Captain Rice's battery, and did effective service in saving Rice's Battery and protecting the withdrawal from the field of the shattered Kentucky Brigade.

In mid-September, Forrest launched a raid into northern Alabama and central Tennessee to disrupt Sherman's supply lines, returning to northern Mississippi in early October. Although he was able to capture nearly 2,400 Union soldiers and many supplies, Sherman captured Atlanta in early September, before Forrest had started his raid. In Lieutenant General Richard Taylor's September 30, 1864, report of the troops in the Department of Alabama, Mississippi, and East Louisiana, the battery is still listed as belonging to Buford's Division of Major General Nathan B. Forrest's Cavalry Corps.

During the Franklin–Nashville Campaign, Thrall's Battery accompanied Major General Nathan Bedford Forrest on a 23-day raid through western Tennessee which culminated in an attack on the Union supply base at Johnsonville. On the evening of November 3, 1864, Forrest positioned his guns across the river from the Federal supply base at Johnsonville. On the morning of November 4, the Confederate batteries were attacked by three Union gunboats from Johnsonville and by six Paducah gunboats. The Confederate artillery was completely effective in neutralizing the threat of the Federal fleets. One of the vessels was hit 19 times, and returned to Johnsonville. Thrall's battery assisted in bombarding the Union supply depot and the 28 steamboats and barges positioned at the wharf. All three of the Union gunboats—Key West, Tawah, and Elfin—were disabled or destroyed. The Union garrison commander ordered that the supply vessels be burned to prevent their capture by the Confederates. Forrest observed, "By night the wharf for nearly one mile up and down the river presented one solid sheet of flame. ... Having completed the work designed for the expedition, I moved my command six miles during the night by the light of the enemy's burning property"

While assigned to General Forrest's command the battery had been given the nickname, the "Arkansas Rats". Following the success at Johnsonville, General Forrest announced that he was re-baptizing the unit as the "Arkansas Braves". One sergeant listening to the General's complements allegedly responded " General, talking may be very good, but something to eat would be a heap better: we have been living on wind for two days." General Forrest responded by providing the battery with a feast of ham and hard tack from the stores of his own headquarters.

The battery is included in a November 20, 1864, abstract of Confederate forces in the Department of Alabama, Mississippi and East Louisiana as being assigned to Chalmer's Division. At this time, Forrest was ordered to move into northern Alabama to unite with the Army of Tennessee, now commanded by John B. Hood. Hood was launching an invasion of central Tennessee and wanted Forrest's corps to replace the cavalry corps of Joseph Wheeler, who was on detached duty in Georgia. Thrall's Battery did not accompany Forrest to join Hood's army, but was assigned as part of the garrison of Corinth Mississippi. On November 27, 1864, Major J.W. Eldridge reported from Corinth, Mississippi, that the only battery currently present at Corinth was Thrall's Battery of four bass pieces. Eldridge indicated that at least 16 guns were needed to defend the fortifications around Corinth

=== Defense of Mobile ===
Major General Dabney H. Maury included the battery in his organization of the Army of Department of Alabama, Mississippi, and East Louisiana, dated December 1, 1864, as being assigned to Brigadier General George B. Hodge's District of Southwest Mississippi and East Louisiana. The battery is included in Major General Dabney H. Maury's March 10, 1865, report on the Organization of troops in the District of the Gulf, as being assigned to the Left Wing, Defenses of Mobile, with other batteries belonging to Lieutenant Colonel L. Hoxton.

The unit participated in the Battle of Spanish Fort, part of the Mobile Campaign, in April 1865. Union forces embarked on a land campaign in early 1865 to take Mobile from the east. Maj. Gen. E.R.S. Canby's XIII and XVI corps moved along the eastern shore of Mobile Bay forcing the Confederates back into their defenses. Union forces concentrated first on Spanish Fort, five miles to the north. On March 27, 1865, Canby's forces undertook a siege of Spanish Fort, which consisted of a semi-circular line of five redoubts stretching almost two miles long. The Union had enveloped the fort by April 1, and on April 8 captured it. Most of the Confederate forces, including the remnants of Thrall's Arkansas Battery escaped and fled to Mobile.

The fall of Fort Blakeley on April 9, 1865, signaled to Confederate General Dabney H. Maury in Mobile that it was time to begin evacuation of the remaining Confederate troops in the city. On April 12, 1865, Mobile was declared an open city and the remaining Confederate garrison retreated with the intention of joining the remains of the Army of Tennessee, then in North Carolina. The surrender of the Army of Tennessee to General Sherman on April 26, 1865, prevented that option and surrender of the Mobile garrison soon followed. This small force out of Mobile, including the remnants of the Monticello Artillery, was the last Confederate army to surrender east of the Mississippi River.

The Jackson Light Artillery was involved in the following battles:

- Battle of Shiloh, Tennessee, April 6–7, 1862.
- Siege of Corinth, Mississippi, April to June 1862.
- Vicksburg Campaign
  - Siege of Jackson, Mississippi, July 10 to July 16, 1863.
- Meridian Campaign, Mississippi, February–March 1864.
  - Battle of Okolona, Mississippi, February 22, 1864.
- Forrest's Defense of Mississippi
  - Battle of Brice's Crossroads, Mississippi, June 10, 1864.
  - Battle of Tupelo, Mississippi, July 14, 1864.
- Forrest's West Tennessee Raid, October 16 – November 10, 1864.
  - Battle of Johnsonville, Tennessee, November 4, 1864.
- Mobile Campaign, March 17 – April 12, 1865.
  - Battle of Spanish Fort, Alabama, March 27 to April 8, 1865.

== Surrender ==
The Jackson Light Artillery was among the last of the Confederate troops east of the Mississippi to surrender. The Jackson Light Artillery aided in the defense of Mobile and surrendered with the Department of Alabama, Mississippi, and East Louisiana. The battery spiked their guns and surrendered at Meridian, Mississippi, May 11, 1865.

== See also ==
- List of Confederate units from Arkansas
- Confederate Units by State
