= Francis A. Shoup =

United States and Confederate States Army officer

Francis Asbury Shoup
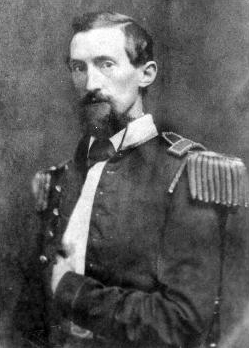
- Francis Asbury Shoup
- Born: March 22, 1834; Franklin County, Indiana, U.S.
- Died: September 4, 1896 (aged 62); Columbia, Tennessee, U.S.
- Burial place: University of the South cemetery
- Military career
- Allegiance: United States of America; Confederate States of America
- Service years: 1855–1860 (USA); 1861–1865 (CSA)
- Rank: Second Lieutenant (USA); Brigadier General (CSA)
- Conflicts: Third Seminole War; American Civil War; Battle of Shiloh; Battle of Prairie Grove; Battle of Vicksburg; Battle of Atlanta
- Other work: professor

Francis Asbury Shoup (March 22, 1834 – September 4, 1896), a lawyer from Indianapolis, Indiana, became a brigadier general for the Confederate States Army during the American Civil War.

== Pre-war ==
Shoup was born near Laurel, Indiana, the first of nine children. He attended Indiana Asbury University in Greencastle, Indiana, and then went to the United States Military Academy, graduating in 1855 fifteenth out of a class of thirty-four. After leaving West Point, he served in the United States Army as a member of the First United States Artillery and fought against the Seminoles in Florida. He decided to retire on January 10, 1860, to become a lawyer in Indianapolis.

Shoup was serving as a leader of an Indianapolis Zouave militia, but once the Civil War started, he moved to Florida to fight for the Confederacy, proclaiming he had "aristocratic inclinations and admiration for the South." This shocked those in the Indianapolis militia, who had loved him as friend, and even gave him a special set of revolvers with holsters and trappings, believing he would serve in the Union army, and that officers would always ride horses and thus would need such a set. All Indianapolis reported of the incident was that Shoup had resigned from the militia.

In 1860, he moved to St. Augustine, Florida, where the Governor commissioned him a Lieutenant. He was actually admitted to the bar in Florida, although whether he actually practiced law is obscure.

== War life ==
At the Battle of Shiloh, he served as chief of artillery under William J. Hardee. In the summer of 1862 he started serving in Arkansas as Inspector General under Major General Thomas C. Hindman. On September 12, 1862, the First Confederate Congress made him a brigadier general, after which he commanded Hindman's Second Division. After the Battle of Prairie Grove, he went back across the Mississippi River.

After he was captured in the Battle of Vicksburg, he met some compatriots from his Indianapolis militia days, but they rejected him for fighting for the Confederacy. After he was paroled, he went to Georgia and fought in the Battle of Atlanta. He designed a defensive line and, following its approval by General Johnston, oversaw the construction in late June 1864 of what would become known as Johnston's River Line. Shoup's design consisted of what would eventually total 36 unique forts later called "Shoupades." While the River Line was deemed an engineering success, its potential force was negated when General Sherman's army crossed the Chattahoochee north of the line. Johnston's River Line is listed on the National Register of Historic Places. During the war, he wrote texts on infantry and artillery drill and advocated for blacks to serve in the Confederate Army. He also served as Chief of Staff for the commander of the Army of Tennessee, John Bell Hood.

== Post-war ==
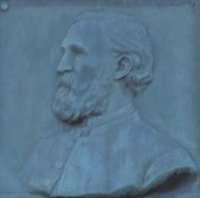
A relief of Brig. Gen. Francis A. Shoup by T.A.R. Kitson at Vicksburg National Military Park, 1910

After the war, Shoup became a professor at the University of Mississippi, and later, at the University of the South in Sewanee, Tennessee. Shoup was also an Episcopal rector and wrote books about mathematics and metaphysics. While he was a professor, Shoup wrote "Uncle Tom's Cabin, Forty Years After" (1893), an essay for the Sewanee Review that considered the impact of Harriet Beecher Stowe's antislavery novel. Shoup initially praises Stowe's book for its broad circulation, but then he laments the loss of a patriarchal system for controlling black people while also expressing relief that white southerners are free of the burden of their slaves.

Upon his death on September 4, 1896, in Columbia, Tennessee, he was buried in the cemetery of University of the South.

In 2006 the Indiana Historical Bureau, Franklin County Historical Society, and the Indiana Division of the Sons of Confederate Veterans placed a historical marker honoring Shoup at Conwell Cemetery in Laurel, Indiana. Shoup Park and historical marker is also located on the campus of the University of the South (Sewanee, Tennessee).

== See also ==
- Indianapolis in the American Civil War
- List of American Civil War generals (Confederate)
