= Gibson =

Gibson, Gibson's or Gibsons may refer to:

== Business ==
- Gibson Appliance, a former American refrigerator manufacturer
- Gibson (guitar company), an American manufacturer of guitars, other musical instruments, and audio equipment
- Gibsons Games, a family-owned UK jigsaw puzzle company
- Gibson Greetings, an American greeting cards brand
- Gibson Manufacturing Corporation, a former American tractor and railroad speeder manufacturer
- Gibson Technology, and English automotive and motorsport company based
- Gibson's Discount Center, a former American discount store chain
- Gibson's Finest, a brand of Canadian whiskey

== People ==
- Gibson (surname)
- Gibson baronets
- Gibson Kamau Kuria (born 1947), Kenyan lawyer
- Gibson Kanai, Palauan politician
- Gibson Kyle (1820–1903), English architect

== Places ==
=== Australia ===
- Gibson, Western Australia, a village
- Gibson Desert, Western Australia

=== Canada ===
- Gibson, Ontario
- Gibsons, a town in British Columbia

=== United States ===
- Gibson, Arkansas
- Gibson, Georgia
- Gibson, Iowa
- Gibson, Louisiana
- Gibson, Mississippi
- Gibson, Dunklin County, Missouri
- Gibson, Pemiscot County, Missouri
- Gibson, New York
- Gibson, North Carolina
- Gibson, Oklahoma
- Gibson, Pennsylvania
- Gibson, Tennessee
- Gibson, Wisconsin

== Other uses ==
- Gibson (cocktail)
- Gibson (dog)
- Gibson (SRMTHFG), a character in Super Robot Monkey Team Hyperforce Go!
- Gibson Amphitheatre, a former indoor amphitheatre in Los Angeles, California, U.S.
- Gibson station, a Long Island Rail Road train station
- Gibsons Italia, a restaurant in Chicago, U.S.
- Gibsons, York, a listed pub in North Yorkshire, England
- Gibson, a style of English clog

== See also ==
- Gibson City, Illinois
- Gibson County (disambiguation)
- Gibson Hall (disambiguation)
- Gibson House (disambiguation)
- Gibson Island (disambiguation)
- Gibson Lake (disambiguation)
- Gibson Theatre (disambiguation)
- Gibson Township (disambiguation)
- Gibson's paradox, an economics observation regarding interest rates and price levels
- Gibsonia (disambiguation)
- Port Gibson (disambiguation)
