= Gibby =

Gibby or Gibbie may refer to:

== People ==
- Mary Gibby (1949–2024), British botanist and professor

=== Nickname ===
- Gibbie Abercrombie (1928–1992), Scottish rugby union player
- Gibby Brack (1908–1960), Major League Baseball outfielder
- Gilbert Elliot-Murray-Kynynmound, 6th Earl of Minto (1928–2005), Scottish peer nicknamed "Gibbie"
- Abigail Folger (1943–1969), nicknamed "Gibbie", American coffee heiress murdered by the Manson Family
- Bob Gibson (1935–2020), nicknamed "Gibby", American baseball pitcher, member of the Baseball Hall of Fame
- Gibby Gilbert (born 1941), American golfer
- Gibby Haynes (born 1957), American musician and lead singer of the group Butthole Surfers
- Gibby Welch (1904–1984), American college football player

== Fictional characters ==
- Gibbie, the title character of Sir Gibbie, an 1879 novel by George MacDonald
- Goose Gibbie, in Old Mortality, an 1816 novel by Sir Walter Scott
- Makoa "Gibby" Gibraltar, a playable character in the 2019 video game Apex Legends
- Gibby Gibson, in the Nickelodeon series iCarly
- Gibby Gibson, protagonist of the 1932 film The Lost Squadron
- "Gibbie" Girder, in some editions of The Bride of Lammermoor, an 1819 novel by Sir Walter Scott
- Gibby Norton, a recurring character in What's New Scooby-Doo?

== Places ==
- Colloquial name for Gibbonsdown, a housing estate in Barry, Wales
- Gibshill, also known as The Gibby, a housing estate in Greenock, Scotland
- "The Gibbie", a nickname of Gilbertson Park, the home of the Shetland football team
- Gibby Creek, a tributary of the Wickham River, Northern Territory, Australia

== Other uses ==
- Gibby (show), an iCarly spinoff series that never aired
- GIBBY Awards, a nickname for the "This Year in Baseball Awards", which are presented annually by Major League Baseball
- A guitar made by the Gibson Guitar Corporation

== See also ==
- Greater Baltimore Bus Initiative, GBBI pronounced "gibby"
- Gib (disambiguation)
- Gibb (disambiguation)
- Gibbs (disambiguation)
- Gibson (disambiguation), sometimes nicknamed "Gibby" or "Gibbie"
- Gilbert (disambiguation), sometimes nicknamed "Gibbie" or "Gibby"
