= Zeus (dog, born 2019) =

Dog (2019–2023)

- Species: Canis lupus familiaris
- Breed: Great Dane
- Sex: Male
- Born: November 2019
- Died: September 12, 2023
- Title: World's Tallest Living Dog
- Predecessor: Freddy
- Successor: Kevin
- Owner: Brittany Davis
- Height: 3 ft 5.18 in (1.0460 m)

Zeus (November 2019 – September 12, 2023) was a Great Dane from Bedford, Texas, in the United States. Until his death, he held the Guinness Book of World Records title of the tallest dog living in the world, standing at 1.046 meters (3 feet, 5.18 inches).

Zeus was owned by Brittany Davis. He was the largest pup in his litter of five, and was exceptionally large even as a younger dog. His diet consisted of 12 cups of Gentle Giants Dog Food daily.

In August 2023, Zeus was diagnosed with bone cancer.

Zeus died on September 12, 2023, at the age of 3. He had developed aspiration pneumonia following an amputation on his right leg on September 7.

The tallest dog ever recorded, also a Great Dane, shared Zeus's name. He died in 2014, at the age of 5.

Records
Preceded by Freddy (dog)	World's tallest dog May 4, 2022 – September 12, 2023	Succeeded by –
