= Gipson =

Gipson is a surname. Notable people with the surname include:

- Alvin Gipson (1914–1987), American baseball player
- Andy Gipson (born 1976), American politician
- Charles Gipson (born 1972), American baseball player
- Fred Gipson (1908–1973), American writer
- Graham Gipson (1932–2023), Australian sprinter
- Helen Gipson (born 1961), British Scrabble player
- Joella Gipson (1929–2012), American musician and mathematician
- Ken Gipson (born 1996), German footballer
- Lawrence H. Gipson (1880–1971), American historian
- Mack Gipson (1931-1995), American Petroleum Geologist and University Professor
- Marlies Gipson (born 1987), American women's basketball player
- Séverine Gipson (born 1970), French politician
- Simon Gipson, Australian schoolteacher
- Tashaun Gipson (born 1990), American football player
- Teddy Gipson (born 1980), American basketball player
- Terry Gipson (born 1963), American politician
- Trevis Gipson (born 1997), American football player
- Xavier Gipson (born 2001), American football player

== See also ==
- Gibson (disambiguation)
