= High Four =

2005 sculpture by Louise Peterson

- Artist: Louise Peterson (sculptor)
- Year: 2005
- Type: Cast bronze sculpture
- Dimensions: 1.4 m (4.6 ft)
- Location: Benson Sculpture Park, Loveland, Colorado; 40°25′26″N 105°5′35″W

High Four is a bronze public sculpture by artist Louise Peterson. It depicts a Great Dane dog, raising one paw as if to shake hands or give a high five.

== Information ==
=== Location history ===
There are ten editions of the sculpture, which are in several public collections, including Benson Sculpture Park in Loveland Colorado. One copy was installed at Canine Corner, a dog park in Cleveland, Colorado, in 2007. It was later relocated to Conestee Dog Park. Other copies are in Northglenn, Colorado, Greenville, South Carolina, and Chattanooga, Tennessee (2008.

== Artist ==
Peterson was born in England in 1962. She moved to the United States in 1984 and studied sculpture at Santa Monica College in Santa Monica, California. She currently lives on a ranch near Guffey, Colorado. She specializes in animal sculpture, especially Great Danes.

== See also ==
- Public Art
- Sculpture
