= Freddy (dog) =

One-time tallest living dog

- Species: Canis Familiaris
- Breed: Great Dane
- Sex: Male
- Born: 17 May 2012; Leigh-on-Sea, Essex, England
- Died: 27 January 2021 (aged 8)
- Title: World’s Tallest Living Dog
- Predecessor: Zeus
- Successor: Zeus
- Owner: Claire Stoneman
- Weight: 88.9 kg (196 lb)
- Height: 3 ft 4.75 in (1.0351 m)

Freddy (17 May 2012 – 27 January 2021) was a Great Dane from Leigh-on-Sea, Essex, England, known for being crowned as the world's tallest living dog by the Guinness Book of World Records, having taken the title from the previous record holder, Zeus, who was the tallest dog ever.

== Biography ==
Freddy was born in May 2012 and lived with his owner, Claire Stoneman, at her home in Leigh-on-Sea, Essex, alongside his sister, Fleur.

As a puppy, Freddy was, ironically, the runt of the litter, and Stoneman had to take him home sooner than planned, as he was not feeding from his mother. When he was young, Freddy also enjoyed chewing up sofas, destroying 26 of them.

Stoneman spent nearly £100 per week to feed him.

Freddy was measured by the Guinness World Records on 13 September 2016, standing at 3 ft 4.75 in (103.5 cm) to the withers, or 7 ft 5.5 in (227.3 cm) when standing on his hind legs. This took longer than expected, as Freddy was initially afraid of the tape measure. He assumed the title from Zeus, a Great Dane from Michigan.

Freddy died on 27 January 2021, aged 8 1/2, after suffering with health issues in his hind legs, causing him to slip easily.

Records
Preceded by Zeus	World's tallest dog 13 September 2016 – 27 January 2021	Succeeded by Zeus
