= Gibson Island =

Gibson Island may refer to:

== Australia ==
- Gibson Island (Houtman Abrolhos, in the Indian Ocean), Western Australia
- Gibson Island, Queensland, an island in the Brisbane River in Brisbane

== Canada ==
- Gibson Island (Nunavut)

== United States ==
- Gibson Island (Maryland)
- Gibson Islands (Alaska)
