= Gibson House (disambiguation) =

Gibson House is a historical museum in Toronto, Ontario, Canada.

Gibson House may also refer to:

- Gibson House (Woodland, California)
- Gibson House (Cincinnati), Ohio
- Gibson House (Jamestown, Pennsylvania)
- Gibson House Museum, in Boston, Massachusetts
