= Giant George =

Record setting Great Dane dog

- Breed: Great Dane
- Sex: Male
- Born: November 17, 2005
- Died: October 17, 2013 (aged 7)
- Title: World's tallest dog
- Term: February 22, 2010 – September 13, 2012
- Predecessor: Titan
- Successor: Zeus
- Owner: David Nasser
- Weight: 245 lb (111 kg)
- Height: 43 in (109.2 cm)

Giant George was a blue Great Dane previously recognised as the world's tallest living dog, and the tallest dog ever by Guinness World Records. There were originally conflicting media reports regarding his height, but the official measurement showed that he was three-quarters of an inch taller than the previous record holder, Titan (at 42.25 inches (107.3 cm) at the withers) and an inch shorter than the subsequent record holder, Zeus. His records were announced as he appeared on The Oprah Winfrey Show in February 2010.

== Biography ==
George was born on November 17, 2005, and was owned by David Nasser since Gorge was 7 weeks old. While measured 42 5/8 inches (108.3 cm) high at the midpoint of the neck and wrongly advertised by Guinness as 43 inches (109.2 cm) at the withers, his legitimate height was 39 1/8 inches (99.4 cm) at the withers according to GPCA Illustrated Standard and he weighed 245 pounds (111 kg), which is about 100 pounds (45 kg) more than an average Great Dane. At the time of his death, Giant George resided in Tucson, Arizona.

At home he slept in a queen-sized bed, and one of his hobbies was to ride around his family's neighborhood in a golf cart. While traveling to Chicago for his 2010 appearance on The Oprah Winfrey Show, George was given a row of three airline seats to himself. He caused a commotion with fellow passengers visiting him to take photographs. "There were so many people coming to the front of the plane, the pilot ended up illuminating the 'fasten seat belt' sign to get everyone to sit down," explained his owner, David. During the flight, George along with David and wife Christine had to sit in the bulkhead, the partition that divides first class from the rest of the passengers. They were to fly first class on American Airlines, but they found that there wasn't enough room for George and instead flew the following day.

George died on October 17, 2013.

== Nomination ==
Conflicting reports were made of George's height, so a Guinness judge was sent to verify it. Craig Glenday, Editor-in-Chief of Guinness World Records explained, "This is a hotly contested record and after some controversy and conflicting media reports we decided to send our own official adjudicator to put the final stamp on this record holder." The measurement by veterinarian Jim Boulay and witnessed by Guinness representative Jamie Panas showed that George was three-quarters of an inch larger than the previous record hold, another Great Dane, Titan.

The records were announced by Oprah Winfrey on February 22, 2010, when George appeared on The Oprah Winfrey Show. George had been awarded the titles secretly on February 15, 2010, with Oprah's producers asking all parties and media to keep the announcement quiet until after his appearance on the show. Inquiries had been made by the show for George to appear prior to him gaining the titles; however, his owner requested that they hold off their appearance until Guinness had reviewed his application.

The announcement of the new record was used by Guinness World Records to publicize a variety of other pet-related record searches, including longest ears on a dog, smallest dog (length), oldest dog, smallest cat and oldest cat.

== See also ==
- List of individual dogs

Records
Preceded by Titan (Great Dane)	World's tallest dog February 22, 2010 – September 13, 2012	Succeeded by Zeus (Great Dane)
