= Titan (dog) =

World record holder for tallest dog

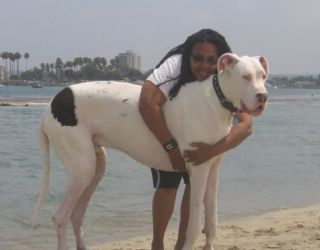
- Species: Canis familiaris
- Breed: Great Dane
- Sex: Male
- Born: 2005
- Died: March 31, 2010 (aged 4–5)
- Title: World's Tallest Dog
- Term: 2009–2010
- Predecessor: Gibson
- Successor: Giant George
- Owner: Diana Taylor
- Weight: 190 lb (86 kg)
- Height: 42.25 in (107.3 cm)

Titan (2005 – 31 March 2010) was an American male white Great Dane who was a holder of the Guinness World Record as the world's tallest dog. His official height was 107.3 centimetres (42.2 in) from the floor to his shoulder. The previous holder was another Great Dane, Gibson, who measured 107.2 centimetres (42.2 in), and died in August 2009. During the nomination process, Titan, who suffered from several health conditions, fought off competition from a Newfoundland from North Dakota and another Great Dane, from Arizona. On February 22, 2010, Titan was dethroned as world's tallest dog by Giant George, a Great Dane from Arizona.

== Biography ==
Diana Taylor, his owner, was living in Atlanta when she adopted Titan in 2005 from the Middle Tennessee Great Dane Rescue. At the time he was three months old, and was already 55 lbs. His owner has a second rescue Great Dane, a female named Ari, who is deaf and is 38 inches (97 cm) tall. She also owns a third dog, a nine-year-old German Shepherd named Diego.

Titan had a number of health problems, including being epileptic, deaf and partially blind. He was trained to respond to commands through touch, although previously when he could see out of one eye, his owner had taught him sign language and he required acupuncture and chiropractic sessions every three weeks to ease his problems. Because of his size, he was often mistaken by children for a horse or cow.

Titan's official measurements were 190 pounds (86 kg) and 42.25 inches (107.3 cm) high at the shoulder. His owner hopes to use Titan's fame to educate the public about the breed, specifically issues with white Great Danes. Great Danes that are predominantly white are usually deaf and can have a variety of eye problems due to a genetic defect called the "merle gene".

After being named the world's tallest dog on November 13, 2009, he appeared on The Tonight Show with Conan O'Brien.

Titan died March 31, 2010, due to complications resulting from a ruptured intestine.

== Nomination ==
Following the former record holder's death, Gibson, there was a period of nomination to the Guinness World Records. Contenders included Boomer, a Landseer Newfoundland from North Dakota who registered in the race at 180 lbs, 7 feet long and 36 inches tall at the shoulder. Another contender was George, a male Great Dane from Arizona, weighing in at 245 pounds and a height at the shoulder of some 42 inches. However, George's height has been in question since his entry into the competition. Previous pictures showing an accurate measurement of 39 1/8 inches at the shoulder and 43 inches when incorrectly measured at the head have since been removed from his website. George has just been named the tallest dog in the world by Guinness World Records after a judge was sent to verify it, beating out Titan by only a quarter of an inch. However, the 2010 edition of the Guinness Book of Records was published on 17 September 2009 listing the former record holder, Gibson, still as the world's tallest dog.

Titan's record was announced on 12 November 2009, which was Guinness World Record Day, when more than 30 records were announced or set. While the charitable work planned by his owner has been slowed due to controversy over the titleholder, his owner has managed to make some headway in the development of temporary shelters that will house people and their pets after natural disasters. His owner hopes to use Titan's notoriety to complete the project and then donate no less than five mobile shelters to rescue organizations for deployment when needed.

== See also ==
- List of individual dogs

Records
Preceded by Gibson (Great Dane)	World's tallest dog 12 November 2009 – 22 February 2010	Succeeded by Giant George (Great Dane)
