= Jamestown, Pennsylvania =

Borough in Pennsylvania, US

- Borough
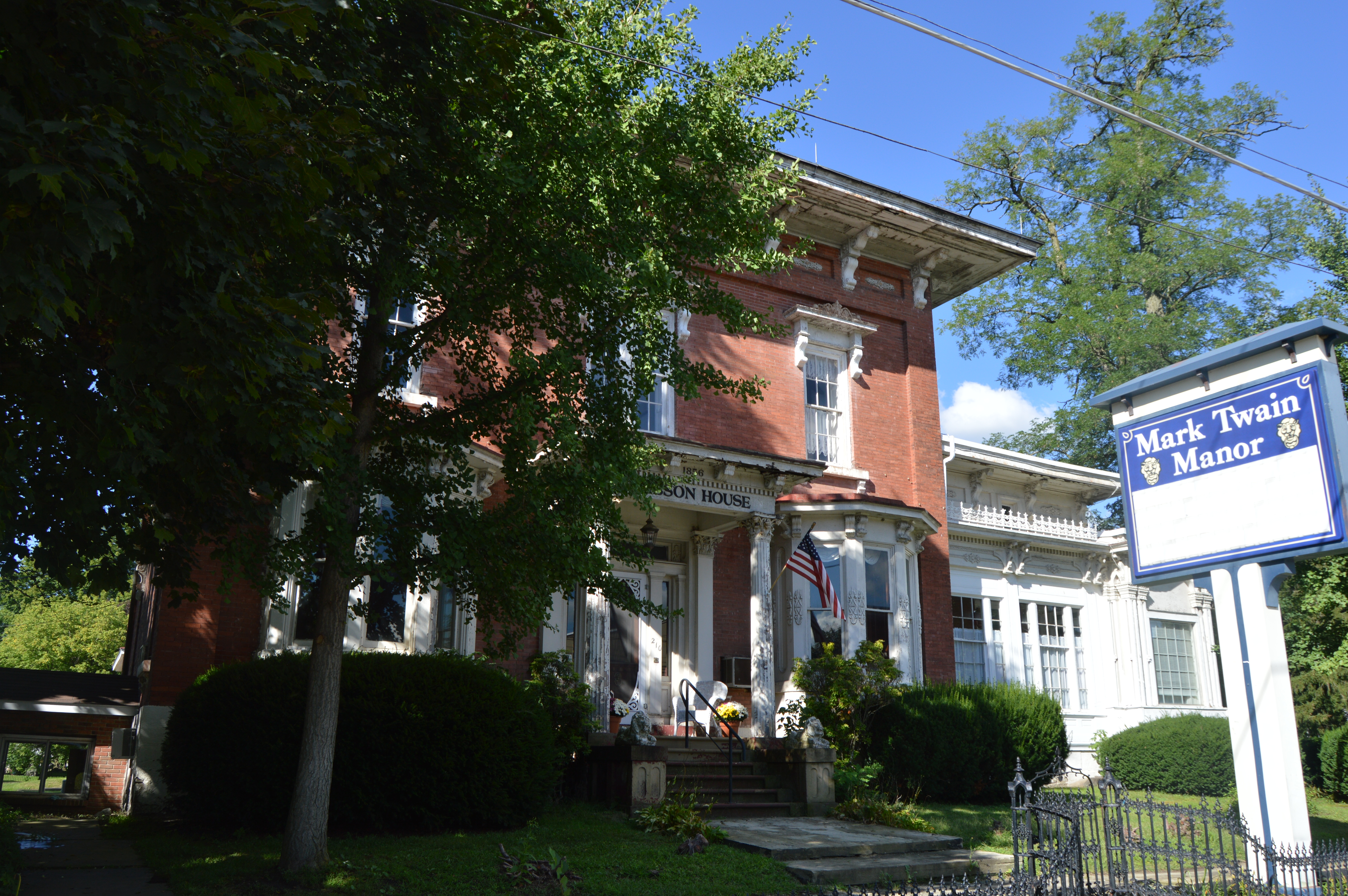
- The Gibson House, a historic site in the borough
- Nickname: Gateway to Pymatuning
- Location of Jamestown in Mercer County, Pennsylvania.

- Location of Jamestown within Pennsylvania
- Coordinates: 41°29′11″N 80°26′18″W
- Country: United States
- State: Pennsylvania
- County: Mercer
- Founded: 1798

Government
  - Mayor: Justin Pipp

Area
  - Total: 0.84 sq mi (2.17 km^{2})
  - Land: 0.83 sq mi (2.16 km^{2})
  - Water: 0.0039 sq mi (0.01 km^{2})

Population (2020)
  - Total: 582
  - Density: 699/sq mi (269.7/km^{2})
- Time zone: UTC-4 (EST)
  - Summer (DST): UTC-5 (EDT)
- Zip code: 16134
- Area code: 724
- School district: Jamestown School District
- FIPS code: 42-37696
- Website: jamestownpa.org

Jamestown is a borough in northwestern Mercer County, Pennsylvania, United States, along the Shenango River. The population was reported as 580 on the 2020 census. It is part of the Hermitage micropolitan area.

== History ==
The town was founded in 1798 by James Campbell. The borough was incorporated in 1853.

The Jamestown area is served by the Jamestown Area School District, and is home to Jamestown Coating Technologies, which produces paint products, as well as Combined Systems, Inc., a tactical weapons producer that exports tear gas and smoke grenades.

The Gibson House was added to the National Register of Historic Places in 1978.

Pymatuning Deer Park is a tourist attraction bringing a zoo like experience with a small petting zoo and interactive bird cage.

== Geography ==
Jamestown is located at 41°29′11″N 80°26′18″W (41.486417, −80.438354).

According to the United States Census Bureau, the borough has a total area of 0.8 square miles (2.1 km^{2}), of which 0.8 square miles (2.1 km^{2}) is land and 1.27% is water.

Historical population
Census	Pop.	Note	%±
1860	256		—
1870	572		123.4%
1880	974		70.3%
1890	822		−15.6%
1900	834		1.5%
1910	822		−1.4%
1920	818		−0.5%
1930	710		−13.2%
1940	819		15.4%
1950	931		13.7%
1960	897		−3.7%
1970	937		4.5%
1980	854		−8.9%
1990	761		−10.9%
2000	636		−16.4%
2010	617		−3.0%
2020	580		−6.0%
2021 (est.)	575		−0.9%

=== Climate ===
Climate data for Jamestown, Pennsylvania (1991–2020 normals, extremes 1932–present)
Month	Jan	Feb	Mar	Apr	May	Jun	Jul	Aug	Sep	Oct	Nov	Dec	Year
Record high °F (°C)	70 (21)	75 (24)	84 (29)	89 (32)	93 (34)	98 (37)	102 (39)	99 (37)	99 (37)	88 (31)	81 (27)	73 (23)	102 (39)
Mean daily maximum °F (°C)	33.7 (0.9)	36.3 (2.4)	45.2 (7.3)	59.1 (15.1)	69.5 (20.8)	77.5 (25.3)	81.1 (27.3)	79.7 (26.5)	73.6 (23.1)	61.9 (16.6)	49.5 (9.7)	38.6 (3.7)	58.8 (14.9)
Daily mean °F (°C)	25.0 (−3.9)	26.4 (−3.1)	34.7 (1.5)	46.9 (8.3)	57.6 (14.2)	66.0 (18.9)	69.9 (21.1)	68.4 (20.2)	62.0 (16.7)	50.9 (10.5)	40.3 (4.6)	30.9 (−0.6)	48.2 (9.0)
Mean daily minimum °F (°C)	16.4 (−8.7)	16.5 (−8.6)	24.3 (−4.3)	34.7 (1.5)	45.6 (7.6)	54.4 (12.4)	58.7 (14.8)	57.1 (13.9)	50.5 (10.3)	40.0 (4.4)	31.1 (−0.5)	23.2 (−4.9)	37.7 (3.2)
Record low °F (°C)	−27 (−33)	−27 (−33)	−18 (−28)	3 (−16)	21 (−6)	28 (−2)	35 (2)	32 (0)	27 (−3)	14 (−10)	−2 (−19)	−19 (−28)	−27 (−33)
Average precipitation inches (mm)	3.16 (80)	2.26 (57)	3.00 (76)	3.93 (100)	3.92 (100)	4.90 (124)	4.63 (118)	3.77 (96)	4.24 (108)	3.55 (90)	3.22 (82)	3.22 (82)	43.80 (1,113)
Average snowfall inches (cm)	18.6 (47)	13.3 (34)	9.5 (24)	1.6 (4.1)	0.0 (0.0)	0.0 (0.0)	0.0 (0.0)	0.0 (0.0)	0.0 (0.0)	0.1 (0.25)	5.0 (13)	13.4 (34)	61.5 (156)
Average precipitation days (≥ 0.01 in)	17.1	13.3	13.0	14.1	13.6	12.9	12.5	11.3	10.6	13.7	13.8	15.5	161.4
Average snowy days (≥ 0.1 in)	10.3	7.6	4.7	1.0	0.0	0.0	0.0	0.0	0.0	0.1	2.3	7.6	33.6
Source: NOAA

== Demographics ==
As of the census of 2000, there were 636 people, 269 households, and 171 families residing in the borough. The population density was 819.5 inhabitants per square mile (316.4/km^{2}). There were 297 housing units at an average density of 382.7 per square mile (147.8/km^{2}). The racial makeup of the borough was 99.53% White, and 0.47% from two or more races.

There were 269 households, out of which 26.8% had children under the age of 18 living with them, 50.9% were married couples living together, 9.7% had a female householder with no husband present, and 36.1% were non-families. 29.7% of all households were made up of individuals, and 15.6% had someone living alone who was 65 years of age or older. The average household size was 2.36 and the average family size was 2.97.

In the borough the population was spread out, with 24.8% under the age of 18, 8.2% from 18 to 24, 27.2% from 25 to 44, 24.7% from 45 to 64, and 15.1% who were 65 years of age or older. The median age was 38 years. For every 100 females there were 87.1 males. For every 100 females age 18 and over, there were 85.3 males.

The median income for a household in the borough was $26,979, and the median income for a family was $40,000. Males had a median income of $31,875 versus $17,917 for females. The per capita income for the borough was $15,199. About 11.6% of families and 15.8% of the population were below the poverty line, including 20.3% of those under age 18 and 3.4% of those age 65 or over.

== See also ==
- List of towns and boroughs in Pennsylvania
