= Gibson County =

Gibson County may refer to:

- Gibson County, Indiana
- Gibson County, Tennessee

== See also ==
- Gibson County Courthouse (disambiguation)
