= Combined Systems, Inc. =

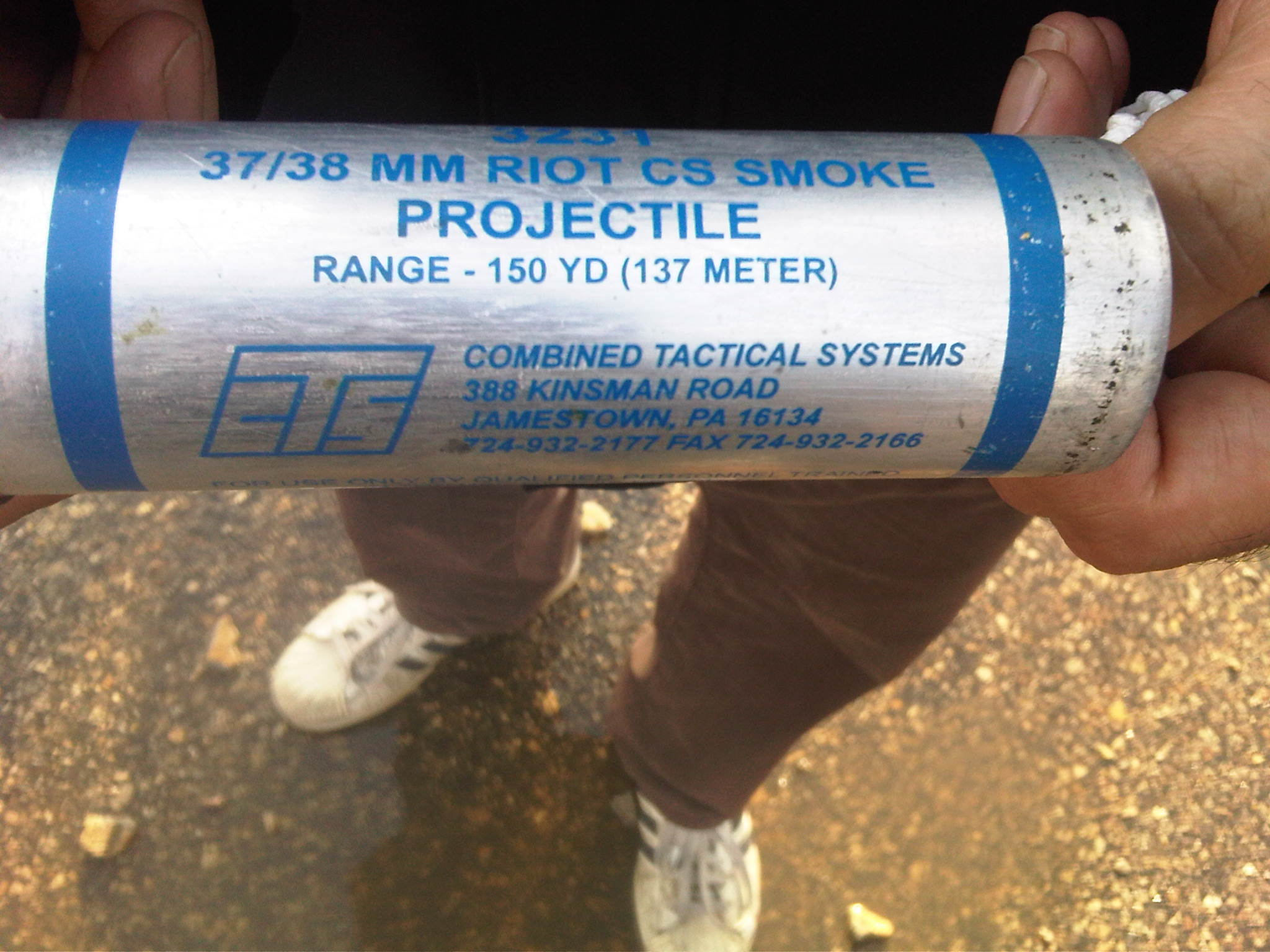
- Combined Tactical Systems tear gas made in U.S.A. found in Egypt
- Trade name: Combined Tactical Systems
- Company type: Privately held company
- Industry: Non-lethal weapons
- Founded: 1981; 44 years ago in the United States
- Founders: Michael Brunn and Jacob Kravel
- Headquarters: Jamestown, PA, United States
- Areas served: Worldwide
- Products: Tear gas and other non-lethal and less-lethal defense equipment
- Owner: Point Lookout Capital Partners
- Website: combinedsystems.com

Combined Systems, also branded as Combined Tactical Systems (CTS), is an American company specializing in the manufacture of less-lethal military and police equipment such as tear gas canisters, flash grenades, breaching munitions, and handcuffs.

It supplies these products to police and military in the United States as well as Egypt, Israel and other countries. Evidence has also been collected by the War Resisters League that its products have been used to disperse protests in Tunisia, Chile, Bolivia, Guatemala, Germany, Netherlands, India, East Timor, Hong Kong, Argentina, Thailand, Trinidad and Tobago, Cameroon, Colombia, Sierra Leone, the United States and Egypt.

The company's main manufacturing plant is in Jamestown, Pennsylvania, United States.

== History ==
The company was founded by Michael Brunn and Jacob Kravel and is owned by Point Lookout Capital Partners.

Discovery of the use of tear gas produced by the US company in various police actions against demonstrations around the world was met with controversy in the social media discussions related to events of the Arab Spring.

In February 2012, the online activist group Anonymous claimed to have hacked the company's website in retaliation for the company's supply of protest suppression weapons to various countries.

On November 25, 2019, MarketWatch, Inc. reported that the Carlyle fund holding Combined Systems’ stock has been closed, and its assets sold off.
