= Gibson House (Jamestown, Pennsylvania) =

Historic house in Pennsylvania, United States

- U.S. National Register of Historic Places
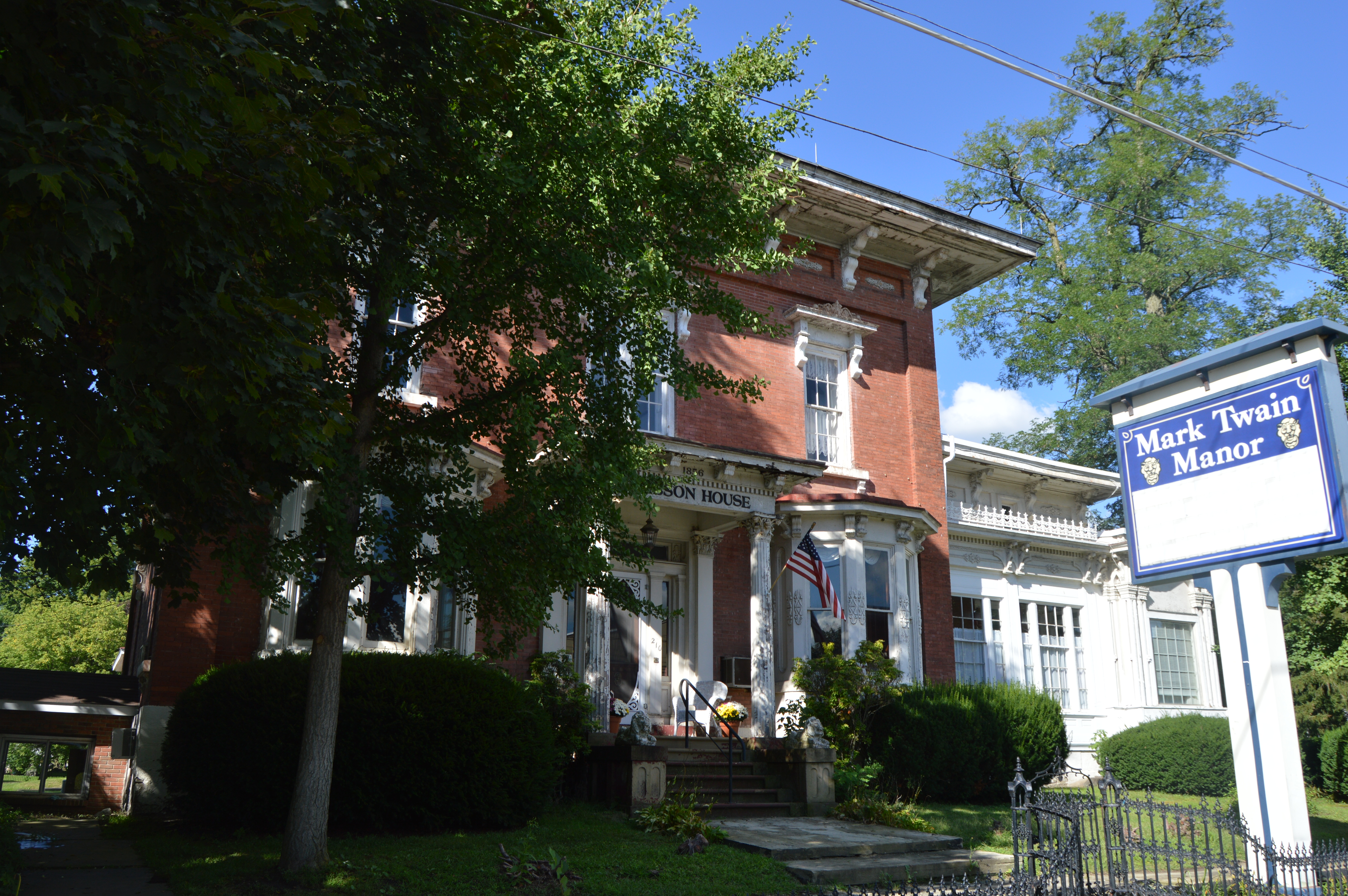
- Front of the house

- Location within Pennsylvania Location within the United States
- Location: 210 Liberty St., Jamestown, Pennsylvania
- Coordinates: 41°29′5″N 80°26′24″W
- Area: 0.5 acres (0.20 ha)
- Built: 1855
- Architectural style: Greek Revival, Italianate, Georgian
- NRHP reference No.: 78002430
- Added to NRHP: December 1, 1978

The Gibson House, also known as The Mark Twain Manor, is an historic home which is located in Jamestown, Mercer County, Pennsylvania.

It was added to the National Register of Historic Places in 1978.

== History and architectural features ==
Built in 1855, the Gibson House is a two-story, square brick residence with a hipped roof and central cupola. The design displays elements of the Greek Revival, Italianate, and Georgian styles. Also located on the property is a contributing carriage house. The house was converted to restaurant use during the mid-1950s, and is now owned by a community foundation.
