= Gibson's paradox =

Economic paradox

Gibson's paradox is the observation that the rate of interest and the general level of prices under the gold standard are positively correlated. It is named for British economist Alfred Herbert Gibson who noted the correlation in a 1923 article for Banker's Magazine. The correlation had been noted earlier by Thomas Tooke.

The term was first used by John Maynard Keynes, in his 1930 work, A Treatise on Money. It was believed to be a paradox because most economic theorists predicted that the correlation would be negative. Keynes commented that the observed correlation was "one of the most completely established empirical facts in the whole field of quantitative economics."

The Quantity Theory of Money predicts that a slower money-growth creates slower price-rise. In addition, slower money-growth means slower growth of loanable funds and thus raises interest rates. If both these premises are true, slower money-growth should mean lower prices and higher interest rates. However, Gibson observed that lower prices were accompanied by a drop—rather than a rise—in interest rates. This is the paradox that needs to be explained. For instance, in the 1873-96 depression, prices fell considerably while interest rates remained low. Economist S.B. Saul says that Alfred Marshall explained the paradox by saying that other factors might have been at play: a peace dividend and improving international system of banking and finance.

Economists generally thought that interest rates were correlated to the rate of inflation, whereas Keynes' findings contradicted this view. During the period of gold standard, he concluded that interest rates were correlated to the general price level, and not the rate of change in the prices. In fact, he thought that interest rates were highly correlated to the wholesale price index rather than the rate of inflation.

With the establishment of the Federal Reserve in the United States in 1914, the correlation between interest rates and the general price level evaporated. This has led most commenters, including Barsky and Summers, to conclude that the correlation was a gold-standard phenomenon and that this can be observed in the inverse correlation between real gold prices and real interest rates.

Others have argued that this is not a strictly gold-standard phenomenon and continued in the correlation between real commodity prices and the earnings yield on equities.
