= Gibshill =

Coordinates: 55.93456°N 4.71184°W

Gibshill: Scots: The Gibby, Spam Island
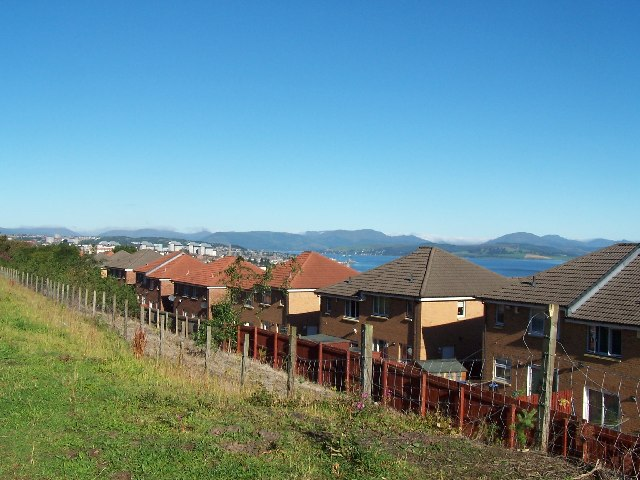
- Houses in Gibshill

- Location within Inverclyde
- OS grid reference: NS307746
- Council area: Inverclyde
- Lieutenancy area: Renfrewshire
- Country: Scotland
- Sovereign state: United Kingdom
- Police: Scotland
- Fire: Scottish
- Ambulance: Scottish
- UK Parliament: Inverclyde
- Scottish Parliament: Greenock and Inverclyde

Gibshill (sometimes spelt as Gibbshill and often referred to as The Gibby, but also known as Spam Island) is the easternmost housing estate in Greenock and adjoins Port Glasgow, both in the Inverclyde Council Area, Scotland. It is served by Bogston railway station. As of 2012 most of the streets in Gibshill have been regenerated and are opened for the first time since the 1970s, among them East Street and Dalmally Street, with new houses on every street. This has changed "the Gibby" from a mainly working class area to a middle class suburb of Greenock with private housing making up two thirds the housing stock.

Gibshill is currently undergoing redevelopment. Until recently consisting mostly of tenements, the area has in recent years undergone much demolition. There are no shops in Gibshill since the shopping district's demolition. Large expanses of grass exist where housing once stood. New housing, both council-owned and private sector, is planned to regenerate the area with some already built in Cobham Street, Bell Street (both private) and Shankland Grove (council-owned). New houses are being constructed on Lansbury Street along with 80 to 100 private houses being constructed on the eastern side of Gibshill.

Wildlife is now common in the area with many rabbits and deer coming from the nearby moors.
