= Port Gibson (disambiguation) =

Port Gibson may refer to:

- Port Gibson, Indiana, a former community in Gibson County
- Port Gibson, Mississippi, a city in Claiborne County
- Port Gibson, New York, a CDP in Ontario County
