= Gibson County Courthouse =

Gibson County Courthouse may refer to:

- Gibson County Courthouse (Indiana), Princeton, Indiana
- Gibson County Courthouse (Tennessee), Trenton, Tennessee
