= Gibson (dog) =

Tall American Great Dane (2002–07)

- Gibson (right) with Zoie, a chihuahua
- Species: Canis lupus familiaris
- Breed: Great Dane
- Sex: Male
- Born: April 26, 2002
- Died: August 7, 2009 (aged 7)
- Occupation: Therapy dog
- Title: World's tallest dog
- Term: 31 August 2004 – 7 August 2009
- Predecessor: Harvey
- Successor: Titan
- Owner: Sandy Hall
- Weight: 180 lb (82 kg)
- Height: 42.2 in (107.2 cm)
- Appearance: Harlequin

Gibson (April 26, 2002 – August 7, 2009) was a Harlequin Great Dane living in Grass Valley, California, United States recognized by the Guinness Book of World Records as the "World's Tallest Dog" in 2004, displacing "Harvey", the previous record holder.

== World record holder ==
While his owner Sandy Hall claims Gibson was 42.6 inches (108.2 cm) tall measured from the ground to the top of his withers and weighs 180 pounds (82 kg), the official report of Guinness World Records states that Gibson was 42.2 inches (107.2 cm) tall.

Gibson was a certified therapy dog and appeared, wearing his trademark bandanna, on several television shows including The Tonight Show, The Oprah Winfrey Show, and The Ellen DeGeneres Show. He was also the official "spokesdog" for ForeverLawn, the maker of K9Grass, based out of Uniontown, Ohio where Gibson could be seen on the occasional walk. The book Gibson Speaks: The World's Tallest Dog Talks About His Life tells his story.

In 2009, he lost one of his legs to bone cancer. Despite chemotherapy, the cancer quickly spread to his lungs and spine, and Gibson could not be saved. On August 7, 2009, his owner had him euthanized.

== See also ==
- List of individual dogs

Records
Preceded by Harvey	World's tallest dog 31 August 2004 – 7 August 2009	Succeeded by Titan (Great Dane)
