= Gibsonia =

Gibsonia may refer to:

- Gibsonia, Pennsylvania, an unincorporated community in Pennsylvania
- Gibsonia, Florida, a census-designated place in Polk County, Florida
- The works by William Gibson, a late 20th-century/early 21st-century speculative fiction author
- Gibsonia, a genus of Fungi, published in 1909
