= Gibson Islands =

Group of islands in the Aleutians West Census Area, Alaska, U.S.

Gibson Islands, off of Attu Island, Alaska, U.S.A.

The Gibson Islands (ca. 52°56′45″N 173°16′15″E) are a group of small islands that extend for 0.3 mi into the mouth of Chichagof Harbor on the northeast side of Attu Island in the Aleutians West Census Area of the U.S. state of Alaska.

The islands were named in July 1855 by the North Pacific Surveying Expedition for Lt. William Gibson, USN, commander of the schooner USS Fenimore Cooper.

Historically, petrels have had a habitat on the islands.
