= Mack Gipson =

American geologist

Mack Gipson Jr.
- Born: September 15, 1931; Trenton, South Carolina
- Died: March 10, 1995 (aged 63)
- Education: Paine College; University of Chicago
- Scientific career
- Fields: Geology, Sedimentology
- Thesis: A Study of the Relations of Depth, Porosity, and Clay Minerals Orientation in Pennsylvanian Shales (1963)

Mack Gipson Jr. (September 15, 1931 – March 10, 1995) was an American geologist who became the second African-American man to obtain a Ph.D. in geology, Dr.James Christopher achieved the distinction first, Ohio state 1959, and is still alive today at 100 years old. The first female, African-American geologist to earn a PhD in the US was Marguerite Williams, who earned her degree in 1942. Gipson's career spanned decades in the petroleum industry as well as decades in academia.

== Biography ==
Gipson was born in Trenton, South Carolina, on [September 15, 1931" and grew up on his grandmother's farm. He persuaded his grandmother to move to Augusta, Georgia, so that he could complete high school. Gipson became interested in science when he studied geology in junior high school and read The Earth and Life Upon It. He studied science and mathematics at nearby Paine College, financed initially by his mother, who borrowed money to get him started. Gipson also worked part-time while in college and received his Bachelor of Science degree in 1953.

Mack was drafted into the U.S. Army in June, 1954, and served as a radio technician during his service from 1954 to 1956. During this time, he began to consider a career as a geologist because "working outdoors as a field geologist interested him more than being confined to classroom or laboratory". He went on to attend the University of Chicago and received his Master of Science degree in 1961. He then began his Ph.D. research on the deep sedimentary rocks near the central Illinois coal fields. Gipson received his Ph.D. from the University of Chicago in Geology in 1963.

Throughout his career Gipson worked in a number of different jobs. For example, he served as the director of a special program for high school scientists, a project of the National Science Foundation. He also worked for several oil corporations such as Exxon, ERCO Industries, the Aminoil Company, and Phillips Petroleum. Gipson started the geology department at Virginia State College (now called Virginia State University). After a decade of working in industry, Gibson returned to teaching in 1986 and joined the faculty of the University of South Carolina as a professor of geology.

Gipson was the founding advisor of the National Association of Black Geologists and Geophysicists (NABGG). in 1980, Gipson hosted a successful Ice Breaker/ Planning Session at his home for geologists of the Houston region looking for a network with other minority professionals in geoscience. The room was full of geoscience professionals with enthusiasm and energy. This excitement led to a series of meetings and the establishment of the NABGG in 1981. Through the years, the NABGG has supported minorities in geosciences and been locally active in schools and professional meetings. The organization's name was changed to the National Association of Black Geoscientists (NABG) in 2014.

== Research ==
Gipson's early research was focused on shale deposits—with specific interest in clay mineralogy and its relationship to shale porosity and burial depths, as well as the development of improved methods for studying clay mineralogy. He was the first to identify large-scale faceted peaks in the equatorial region of Mars from images returned by the Mariner 9.

His later research was focused mostly on collaborations studying potential petroleum reservoirs.

== Honors and awards ==
Gipson served as a member of the National Academy of Sciences Science Study Group on Geological Training and Research in the Republic of Zaire in 1972. In the mid-1990s, U. S. Secretary of Energy Hazel B. O'Leary appointed Gipson to the National Petroleum Council (US).

Gipson received many honors during his career. Among other awards, he was honored by Paine College with the Alumni Achievement Award, the President's Award, and the Presidential Citation. A teacher for many years, he was recognized as a member of the Outstanding Educators of America.

The School of the Earth, Ocean and Environment of the University of South Carolina offers the Mack Gipson scholarship to students from groups traditionally under-represented in the Geosciences in honor of for Gipson. The academic advising center at Paine College is named the Mack Gipson Jr., Tutorial and Enrichment Center.

== Personal life ==
Gipson married Alma Gadison in 1956 after being discharged from the army. They had 4 children together. Gipson also left behind an older sister by the name of Margaree Gipson Moore of Augusta, GA.
