= Zeus (dog, born 2008) =

Past Guinness World record holder for tallest dog (2008-2014)

- Species: Canis familiaris
- Breed: Great Dane
- Sex: Male
- Born: November 22, 2008; Otsego, Michigan, United States
- Died: September 3, 2014 (aged 5); Otsego, Michigan, United States
- Known for: Tallest dog ever
- Title: World's Tallest Dog
- Predecessor: Giant George
- Successor: Freddy
- Owners: Kevin and Denise Doorlag
- Weight: 70.3 kg (155 lb)
- Height: 111.8 cm (3 ft 8.0 in)

Zeus (November 22, 2008 – September 3, 2014) was a Great Dane from Otsego, Michigan, United States, famous for being named the "world's tallest dog" by the 2012 and 2013 Guinness Book of World Records.

== Description ==
Standing on his hind legs, Zeus stretched 7 feet 5 inches (2.26 meters), and when measured in October 2011, Zeus was 3 feet 8 inches (1.118 meters) from his foot to his withers.

== Death ==
On September 11, 2014, Zeus' owner, Kevin Doorlag, announced that he had died on September 3, with symptoms of old age.

== See also ==
- List of individual dogs

Records
Preceded by Giant George (Great Dane)	World's tallest dog September 13, 2012 – September 3, 2014	Succeeded by Freddy (Great Dane)
