= Gibson Island (Nunavut) =

Island in Nunavut, Canada

- Location within Nunavut Location within Canada

Geography
- Location: Franklin Strait
- Coordinates: 71°47′0″N 095°20′0″W
- Archipelago: Canadian Arctic Archipelago

Administration
- Canada
- Territory: Nunavut
- Region: Kitikmeot

Demographics
- Population: Uninhabited

Gibson Island is located in Nunavut's Kitikmeot Region within the northern Canadian Arctic. It is in Franklin Strait, west of the mainland's Boothia Peninsula, and 26.5 km (16.5 mi) southwest of Murchison Promontory.
