= Gibson Theatre =

The Gibson Theatre may refer to:

- Universal Amphitheatre, am amphitheatre in Los Angeles
- Dunbar Theatre (Philadelphia), a theatre in Philadelphia known in the 1920s as the Gibson Theatre
