= Gibson, Iowa =

- City
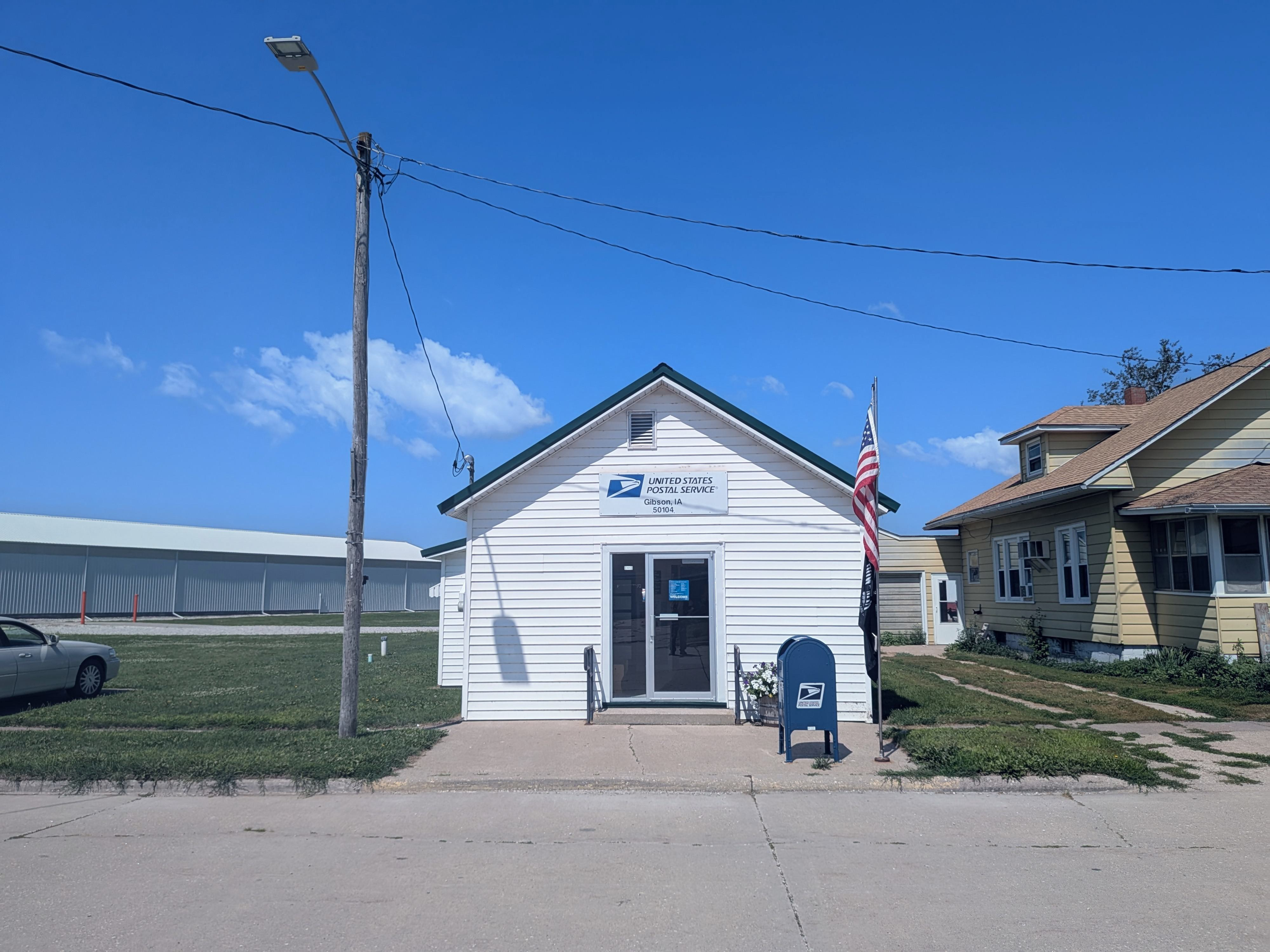
- Gibson post office

- Location of Gibson, Iowa
- Coordinates: 41°28′49″N 92°23′32″W
- Country: United States
- State: Iowa
- County: Keokuk

Area
  - Total: 0.062 sq mi (0.16 km^{2})
  - Land: 0.062 sq mi (0.16 km^{2})
  - Water: 0 sq mi (0.00 km^{2})
- Elevation: 886 ft (270 m)

Population (2020)
  - Total: 63
  - Density: 998.1/sq mi (385.38/km^{2})
- Time zone: UTC-6 (Central (CST))
  - Summer (DST): UTC-5 (CDT)
- ZIP code: 50104
- Area code: 641
- FIPS code: 19-30540
- GNIS feature ID: 2394890

Gibson is a city in Keokuk County, Iowa, United States. The population was 63 at the time of the 2020 census.

== Geography ==
According to the United States Census Bureau, the city has a total area of 0.07 square miles (0.18 km^{2}), all of it land.

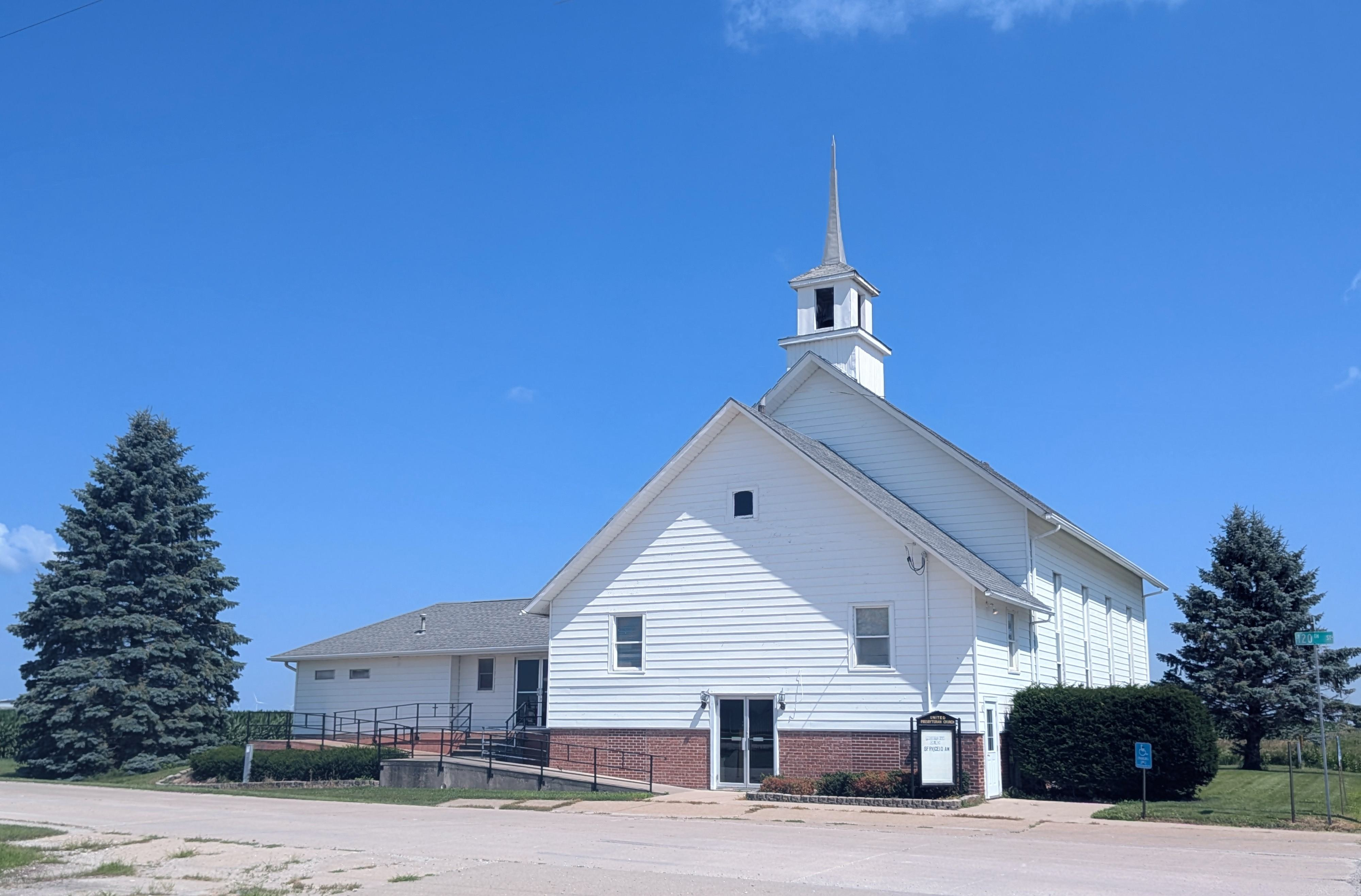
United Presbyterian Church in Gibson

== Demographics ==
Historical populations
Year	Pop.	±%
1960	77	—
1970	80	+3.9%
1980	75	−6.2%
1990	63	−16.0%
2000	92	+46.0%
2010	61	−33.7%
2020	63	+3.3%
Source:"U.S. Census website". United States Census Bureau. and Iowa Data Center; Source: U.S. Decennial Census

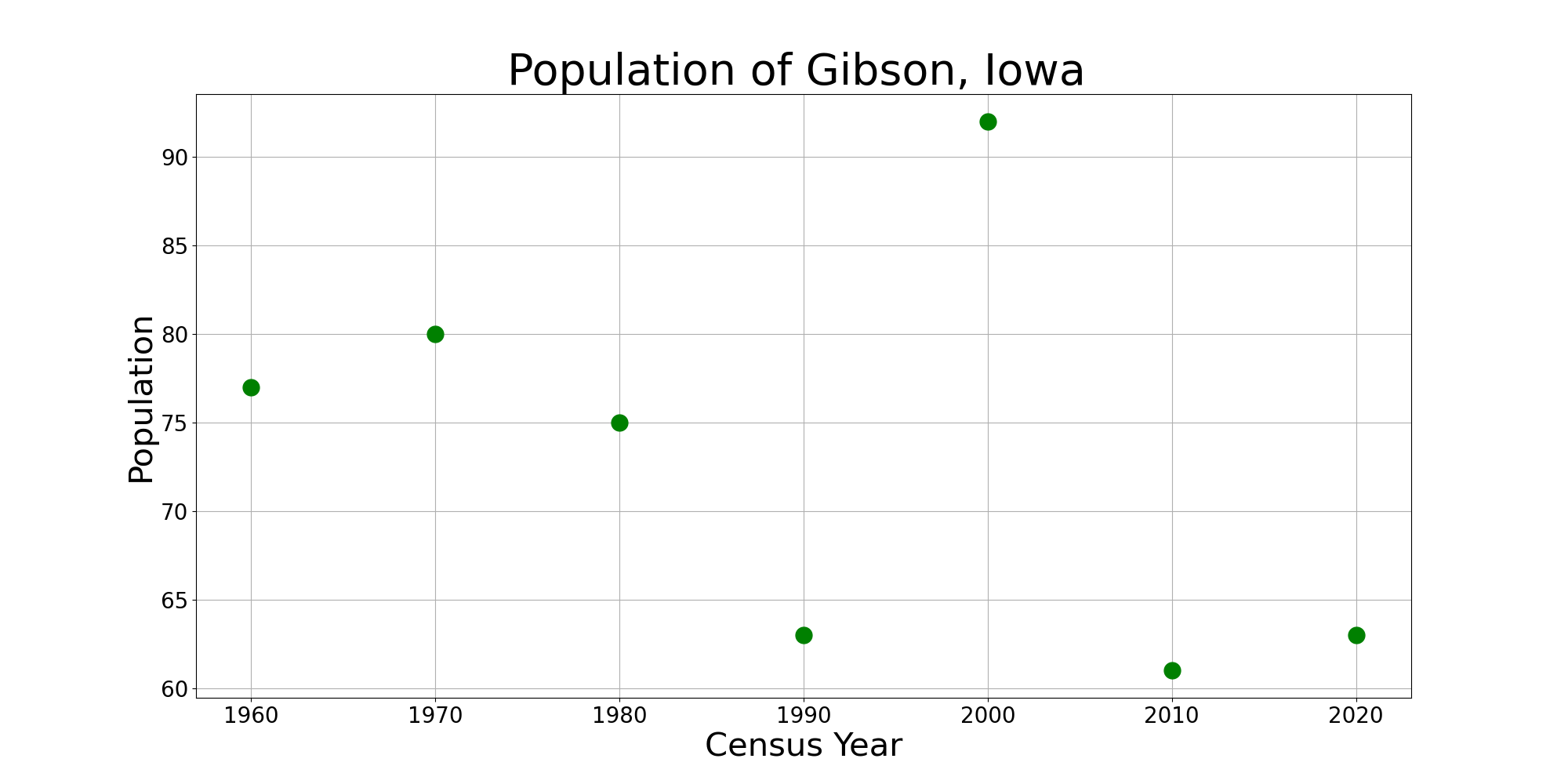
The population of Gibson, Iowa from US census data

=== 2020 census ===
As of the census of 2020, there were 63 people, 27 households, and 21 families residing in the city. The population density was 998.1 inhabitants per square mile (385.4/km^{2}). There were 31 housing units at an average density of 491.1 per square mile (189.6/km^{2}). The racial makeup of the city was 93.7% White, 0.0% Black or African American, 0.0% Native American, 0.0% Asian, 0.0% Pacific Islander, 3.2% from other races and 3.2% from two or more races. Hispanic or Latino persons of any race comprised 1.6% of the population.

Of the 27 households, 37.0% of which had children under the age of 18 living with them, 33.3% were married couples living together, 11.1% were cohabitating couples, 22.2% had a female householder with no spouse or partner present and 33.3% had a male householder with no spouse or partner present. 22.2% of all households were non-families. 11.1% of all households were made up of individuals, 3.7% had someone living alone who was 65 years old or older.

The median age in the city was 37.5 years. 30.2% of the residents were under the age of 20; 4.8% were between the ages of 20 and 24; 25.4% were from 25 and 44; 27.0% were from 45 and 64; and 12.7% were 65 years of age or older. The gender makeup of the city was 52.4% male and 47.6% female.

=== 2010 census ===
As of the census of 2010, there were 61 people, 28 households, and 18 families living in the city. The population density was 871.4 inhabitants per square mile (336.4/km^{2}). There were 34 housing units at an average density of 485.7 per square mile (187.5/km^{2}). The racial makeup of the city was 98.4% White and 1.6% Asian.

There were 28 households, of which 35.7% had children under the age of 18 living with them, 46.4% were married couples living together, 17.9% had a female householder with no husband present, and 35.7% were non-families. 32.1% of all households were made up of individuals, and 14.3% had someone living alone who was 65 years of age or older. The average household size was 2.18 and the average family size was 2.72.

The median age in the city was 41.5 years. 24.6% of residents were under the age of 18; 8.2% were between the ages of 18 and 24; 21.4% were from 25 to 44; 27.8% were from 45 to 64; and 18% were 65 years of age or older. The gender makeup of the city was 47.5% male and 52.5% female.

=== 2000 census ===
As of the census of 2000, there were 92 people, 38 households, and 19 families living in the city. The population density was 1,389.9 inhabitants per square mile (536.6/km^{2}). There were 41 housing units at an average density of 619.4 per square mile (239.2/km^{2}). The racial makeup of the city was 100.00% White.

There were 38 households, out of which 36.8% had children under the age of 18 living with them, 44.7% were married couples living together, 5.3% had a female householder with no husband present, and 47.4% were non-families. 44.7% of all households were made up of individuals, and 23.7% had someone living alone who was 65 years of age or older. The average household size was 2.42 and the average family size was 3.60.

In the city, the population was spread out, with 33.7% under the age of 18, 9.8% from 18 to 24, 31.5% from 25 to 44, 6.5% from 45 to 64, and 18.5% who were 65 years of age or older. The median age was 32 years. For every 100 females, there were 91.7 males. For every 100 females age 18 and over, there were 96.8 males.

The median income for a household in the city was $39,375, and the median income for a family was $45,625. Males had a median income of $21,094 versus $27,917 for females. The per capita income for the city was $12,881. There were 9.5% of families and 6.7% of the population living below the poverty line, including 7.5% of under eighteens and none of those over 64.

== Education ==
The Tri-County Community School District operates local area public schools.
