= Gibson Township =

Gibson Township may refer to the following places in the United States:

- Gibson Township, Washington County, Indiana
- Gibson Township, Michigan
- Gibson Township, Mercer County, Ohio
- Gibson Township, Cameron County, Pennsylvania
- Gibson Township, Susquehanna County, Pennsylvania
