= Gibson Hall =

Gibson Hall may refer to:

- Gibson Hall (Tulane University), a building at Tulane University in the United States
- Gibson Hall (University of Arkansas), a building at the University of Arkansas in the United States
- Gibson Hall, London, built as the headquarters of the former National Provincial Bank
