= Great Dane =

German breed of dog

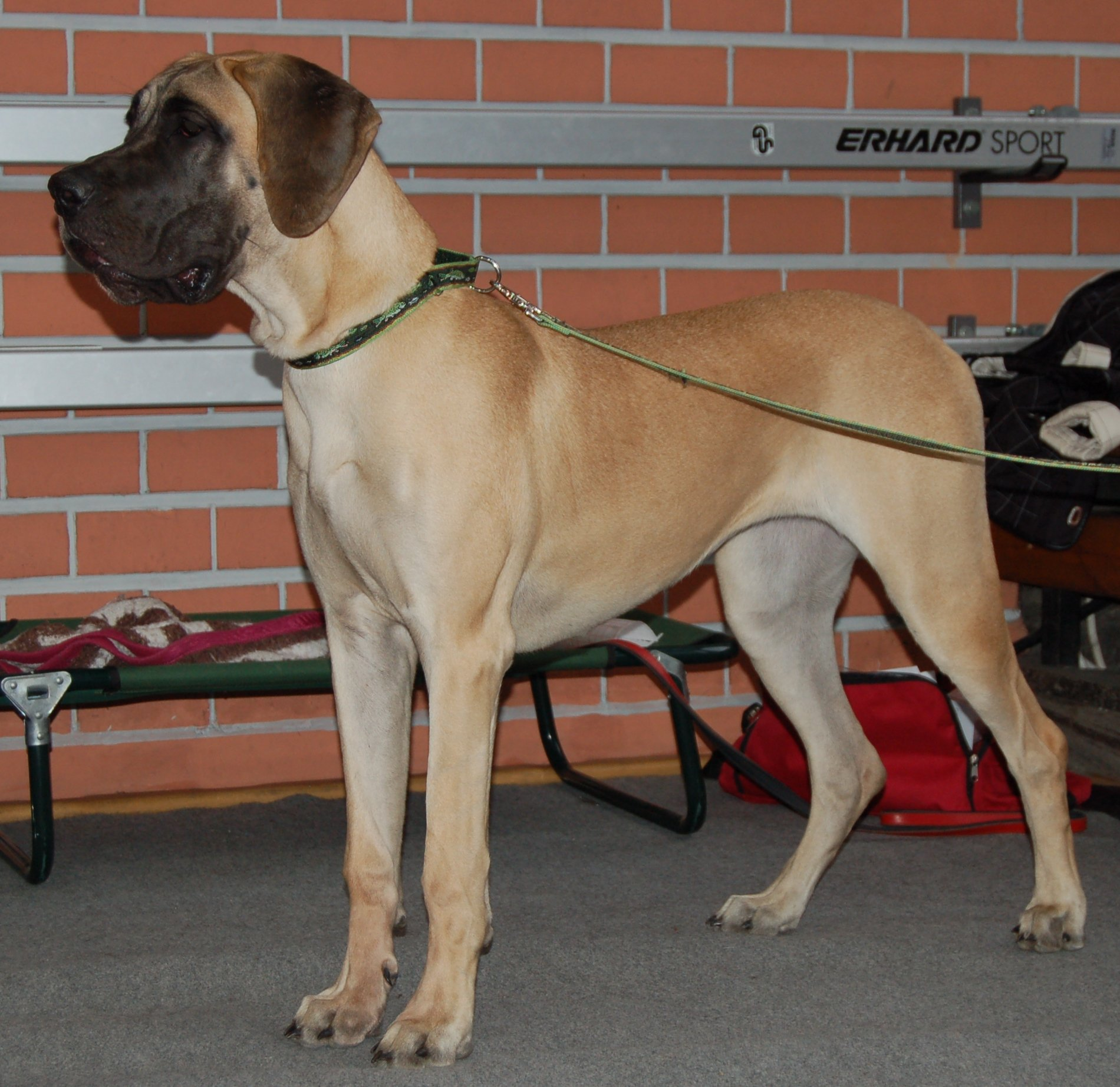
- Other names: German Mastiff; German Boarhound; Boarhound; Deutsche Dogge; Grand Danois
- Origin: Germany
Traits
Height	Males	80–90 cm (31–35 in)
	Females	72–84 cm (28–33 in)
Kennel club standards
- Verband für das Deutsche Hundewesen: standard
- Fédération Cynologique Internationale: standard

The Great Dane is a large German dog breed of the mastiff-sighthound types which is descended from hunting dogs of the Middle Ages that were used to hunt bear, boar, and deer. They were also used as guard dogs of German nobility. Along with the Irish Wolfhound, it is among the tallest dog breeds in the world.

== History ==
In the sixteenth century the nobility in many countries of Europe imported strong, long-legged dogs of different sizes and phenotypes, some of mastiff or sighthound type, from England and Ireland. These dogs were called Englische Docke or Englische Tocke (later written and spelled Dogge) or Englischer Hund in Germany. The name simply meant "English dog". Since then, the English word "dog" has come to be associated with a molossoid dog in Germany and France. These dogs were bred in the courts of German nobility, independent of the English methods, since the beginning of the seventeenth century.

The dogs were used for hunting bear, boar, and deer at princely courts, with the favorites staying in the bedchambers of their lords at night. These Kammerhunde (chamber dogs) were outfitted with ornate collars, and helped to protect the sleeping princes from assassins.

When hunting bear, boar, and deer, the Englische Dogge was a catch dog used after the other hunting dogs to seize the bear, boar, or deer and hold it in place until the huntsman was able to kill it. When the hunting customs changed, particularly because of the use of firearms, many of the involved dog types disappeared. The Englische Dogge became rare, and was kept only as a dog of hobby or luxury.

=== Name change ===
In 1878, a committee was formed in Berlin which changed the name of the "Englische Dogge" (English mastiff derivatives) to the "Deutsche Dogge" (German mastiff), this being the Great Dane. This laid the foundations from which the breed was developed. During the nineteenth century, the dog was known as the "German Boarhound" in English-speaking countries. Some German breeders tried to introduce the names "German Dogge" and "German Mastiff" to the English market, because they believed the breed should be marketed as a dog of luxury and not as a working dog. However, due to the increasing geopolitical tensions between Germany and France and Great Britain, the dog later became referred to as a "Great Dane", a literal translation from the new name given to it by the French, Grand Danois, even though the breed has no known connection to Denmark. In Germany, it remains known as the "Deutsche Dogge." In the Scandinavian languages, the French name and pronunciation are used.

In the late nineteenth century the dogs were sometimes known as Reichshunds ("Empire dogs") because of their association with the Reichskanzler, Otto von Bismarck.

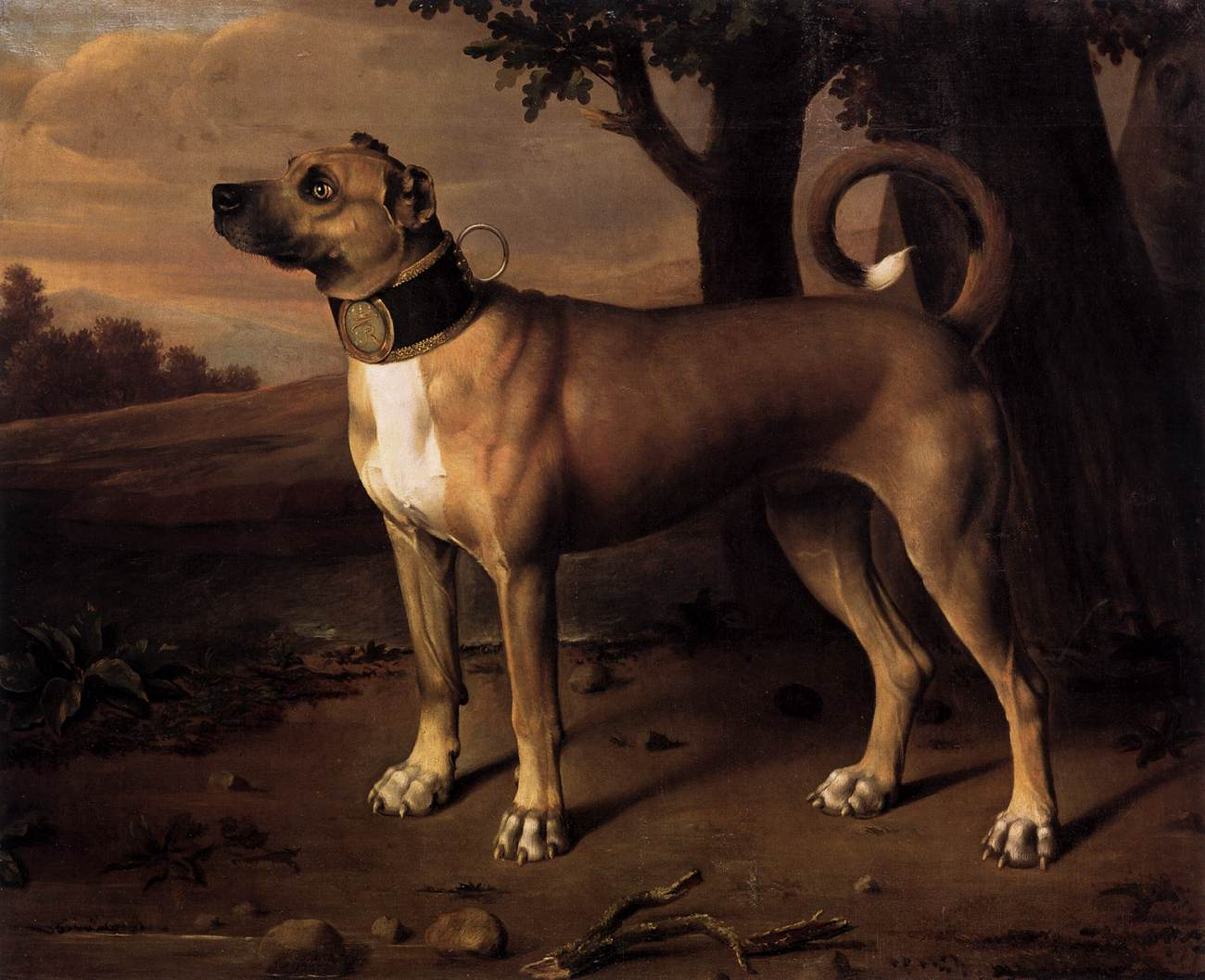
A "chamber dog" with a gilded collar, Brandenburg (Germany), 1705

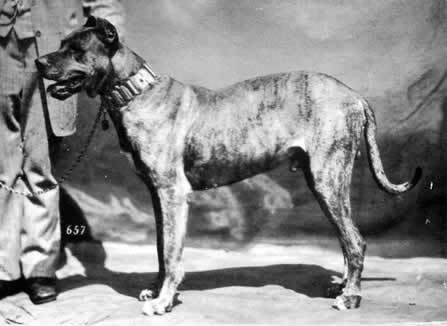
Great Dane from 1879

"Boar hounds" imported into Great Britain from the German Electorate of Hesse, 1807

== Description ==
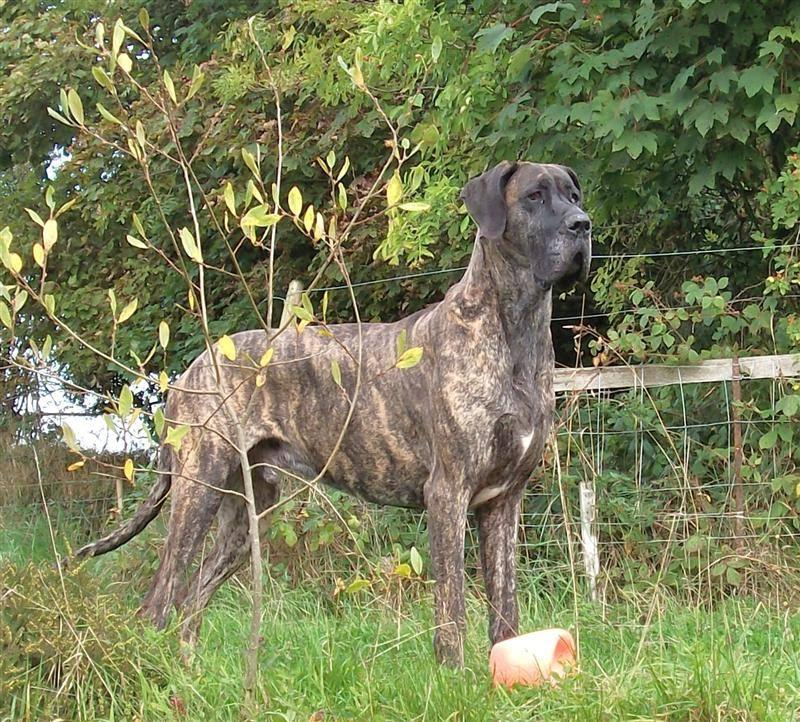
Brindle Great Dane (male)

The Great Dane is an extremely large domestic dog of mastiff-sighthound type known for its big size. It is often called the "Apollo of dogs".

As described by the American Kennel Club:

The Great Dane combines, in its regal appearance, strength, and elegance with great size and a powerful, well-formed, smoothly muscled body. It is one of the giant working breeds, but is unique in that its general conformation must be so well balanced that it never appears clumsy, and shall move with a long reach and powerful drive. The Great Dane is a short-haired breed with a strong, galloping figure.

In the ratio between length and height, the Great Dane should be square. A male dog should not be less than 76 cm (30 in) at the shoulders, a female dog 71 cm (28 in). Danes under minimum height are disqualified. Over the years, the tallest living dog has typically been a Great Dane. Previous record holders include Gibson, Titan, and Giant George; however, the current record holder is a black Great Dane named Zeus that stood 111.8 cm (44 in) at the shoulder before his death in September 2014. He was also the tallest dog on record (according to the Guinness World Records), beating the previous record holder, the aforementioned Giant George that stood 109.2 cm (43 in) at the shoulder.

Both the UK and the New Zealand Kennel Clubs specify the minimum weight for a Great Dane over 18 months of age, as 54 kg (120 lb) for males, 45 kg (100 lb) for females. The American Kennel Club dropped the minimum weight requirement from its standard. The male should appear more massive throughout than the female, with a larger frame and heavier bone.

Great Danes have naturally floppy, triangular ears. In the past, when Great Danes were commonly used to hunt boars, cropping of the ears was performed to make injuries to the dogs' ears less likely during hunts. Now that Danes are primarily companion animals, cropping is sometimes still done for traditional and cosmetic reasons. In the 1930s when Great Danes had their ears cropped, after the surgery, two devices called Easter bonnets were fitted to their ears to make them stand up. Today, the practice is still common in the United States, but much less common in Europe. In some European countries such as the United Kingdom, Ireland, Denmark, and Germany, and parts of Australia and New Zealand, the practice is banned or controlled so as to be only performed by veterinary surgeons.

The dogs are generally not unduly aggressive towards people and other animals.

=== Coat ===
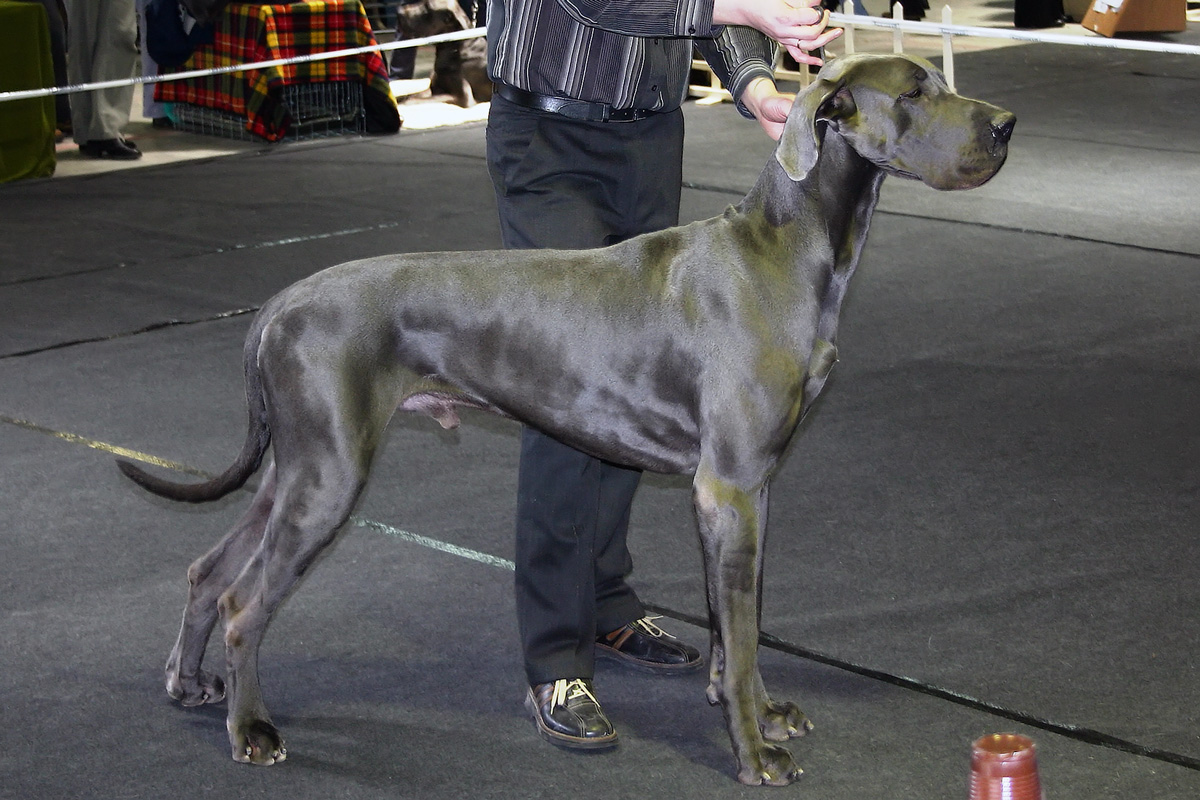
Blue Great Dane

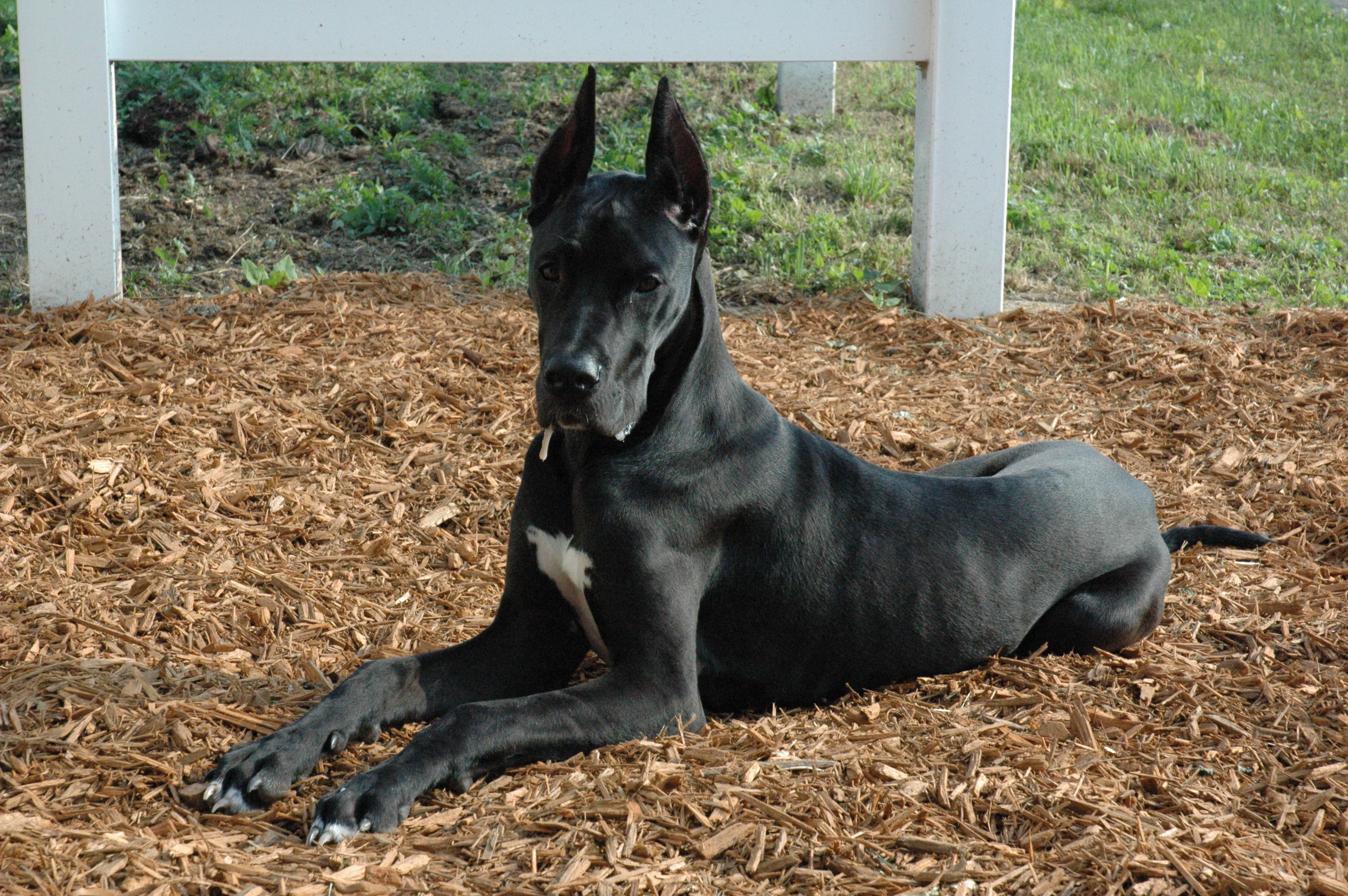
Black Great Dane puppy with cropped ears

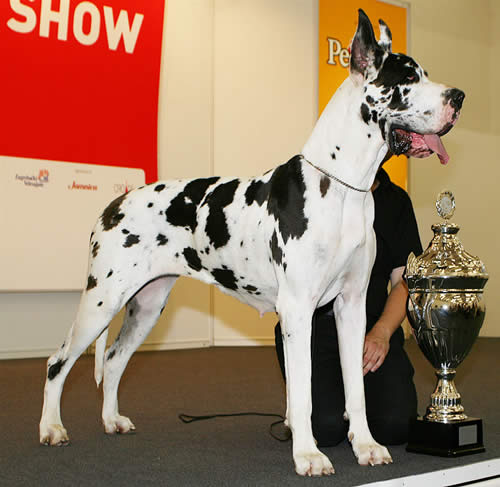
Harlequin Great Dane with cropped ears

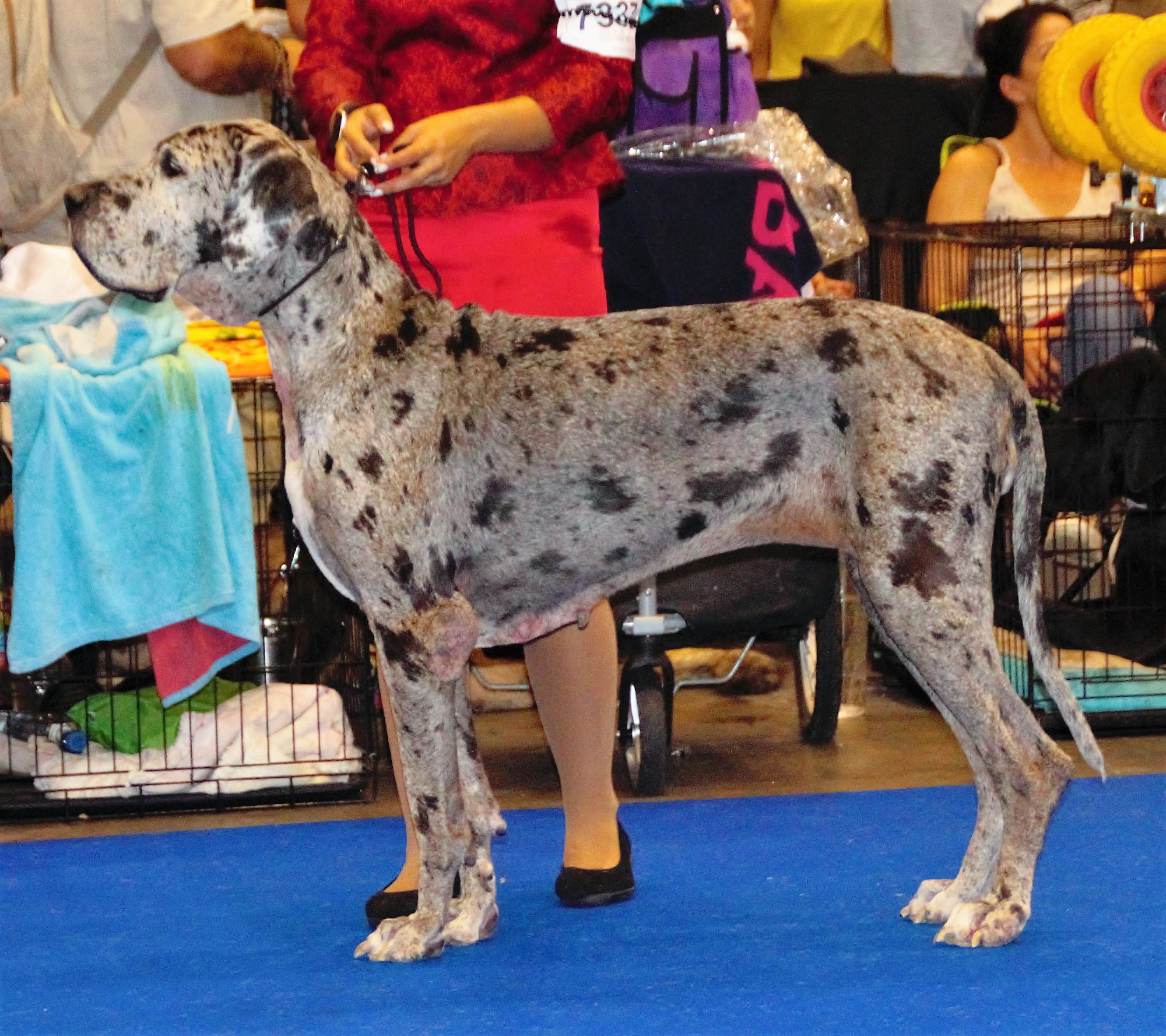
Grey merle Great Dane

According to the breed standard, Great Danes have seven to eight (depending on the standard) show-acceptable coat colours:

- Fawn and brindle
  - Fawn: The colour is yellow-gold with a black mask. Black should appear on the eye rims and eyebrows and may appear on the ears.
  - Brindle: The colour is fawn and black in a chevron striped pattern. Often they are referred to as having a striped pattern.
- Black, harlequin, grey merle and mantle
  - Black: The colour is a glossy black. White markings on the chest and toes are not desirable and considered faults.
  - 'Harlequin: The base colour is pure white with torn black patches irregularly distributed over the entire body; a pure white neck is preferred. The black patches should never be large enough to give the appearance of a blanket, nor so small as to give a stippled or dappled effect. Eligible, but less desirable, are a few small patches of grey that is consistent with a merle marking, or a white base with single black hairs showing through, which tend to give a salt and pepper or dirty effect. Merlequin, a white Great Dane with grey merle patches instead of black ones, is a disqualification.
    - Grey merle (Grautiger) Great Danes are acceptable in conformation shows under the Fédération Cynologique Internationale (FCI). This colour was previously a disqualifying fault, but the fault was deleted in a new breed standard in 2012 to provide a wider gene pool and because the grey merle gene can produce a correct harlequin coat. Their official status is that they are "neither desirable nor to be disqualified". Consequently, this colour must never obtain the highest grading at dog shows. The American Kennel Club recognizes this colour under the name of Merle with two varieties, Solid Merle and Merle with a Mantle Pattern.
  - Mantle (in some countries also known as Boston due to this coat's colour and pattern being similar to that of the Boston Terrier): The colour is black and white with a solid black blanket extending over the body; a black skull with a white muzzle; a white blaze is optional; a whole white collar is preferred; a white chest; white in part or the whole of the forelegs and the hind legs; a white-tipped black tail. A small white marking in the black blanket is acceptable, as is a break in the white collar.
- Blue and blue brindle
  - Blue: The colour is a pure steel blue. White markings at the chest and feet are permitted - never with a fawn nuance or blackish-blue colour.
  - Blue brindle: This is a brindle coat with a blue-gray background and darker brindle striping.

== Health ==
Like most giant dogs, Great Danes have a fairly slow metabolism. This results in less energy and less food consumption per pound of the dog than in small breeds. A neutered adult of about 140 lb (64 kg) needs roughly 2,200–2,500 kcal per day. They have some health problems that are common to large breeds, which includes bloat (gastric dilatation volvulus (GDV)).

Nutrition plays a role in this breed's health. Bloat, or gastric dilatation-volvulus (GDV), is the greatest killer of Great Danes.

One study of large and giant-breed dogs attributed about 52% of GDV cases in giant breeds to the use of a raised feeding bowl. A model of Great Danes estimated a lifetime GDV risk of about 37%. The same model found that a preventive gastropexy could greatly reduce deaths from the medical condition.

A 2024 UK study found the average life expectancy of the breed to be 10.6 years, compared to an average of 12.7 for purebreeds and 12 for crossbreeds. A 2005 Swedish study of insurance records found 83% of Great Danes died by the age of 10, higher than the overall rate of 35% of dogs dying by the age of 10.

Dilated cardiomyopathy and many congenital heart diseases are also commonly found in the Great Dane, leading to its nickname: the heartbreak breed, in conjunction with its shorter lifespan. Great Danes also may carry the merle gene, which is part of the genetic makeup that creates the harlequin colour. The merle gene is an incomplete dominant, meaning only one copy of the gene is needed to show the merle colour; two merle genes produce excessive white markings and many health issues such as deafness, blindness, or other debilitating ocular issues. Another relevant gene for the breed is the harlequin gene. For the dog to have the harlequin colour, both one copy of the merle gene and one copy of the harlequin gene are needed. Homozygosity at the affected locus for the harlequin gene is lethal for dogs already at the embryonic stage.

Great Danes can also develop wobbler disease, a condition affecting the spinal column. Since these dogs grow at a rapid rate, the vertebrae can push up against the spinal cord and cause weakness in the legs. This can be treated with surgery or may heal itself over time.

Like many larger breeds, Great Danes are at particular risk for hip dysplasia.

== Notable dogs ==
- Just Nuisance, enlisted in the Royal Navy during World War II, served at HMS Afrikander, a Royal Navy shore establishment in Simon's Town in the Western Cape province of South Africa.
